= List of nature centers in New Jersey =

This is a list of nature centers and environmental education centers in the state of New Jersey.

To use the sortable tables: click on the icons at the top of each column to sort that column in alphabetical order; click again for reverse alphabetical order.

Name	Location	County	Region	Summary
Allaire State Park Nature Center	Farmingdale	Monmouth	Shore Region	3,199 acres, center operated seasonally by the Conserve Wildlife Foundation of New Jersey
Bamboo Brook Outdoor Education Center	Chester Township	Morris	Gateway Region	website, operated by the County, 100 acres including fields, woodlands and a formal garden
Belleplain State Forest	Woodbine	Cape May	South Jersey	21,320 acres
Black River County Park	Chester Township	Morris	Gateway Region	Operated by the County, 223 acres, features the Kay Environmental Center
Cape May Bird Observatory - Center for Research and Education	Cape May Court House	Cape May	South Jersey	Operated by the New Jersey Audubon Society, bird watching, open Jan-May
Cape May Bird Observatory - Northwood Center	Cape May Point	Cape May	South Jersey	Operated by the New Jersey Audubon Society, bird watching
Cora Hartshorn Arboretum and Bird Sanctuary	Short Hills	Essex	Gateway Region	16.5 acres, trails, live animals, programs
Closter Nature Center	Closter	Bergen	Gateway Region	website, 136 acres of ponds, brooks, meadows and forests
Cooper Environmental Center - Cattus Island Park	Toms River	Ocean	Shore Region	530 acres, center features local wildlife including snakes, reptiles and aquatic animals
Demarest Nature Center	Demarest	Bergen	Gateway Region	website, 55 acres
Duke Farms	Hillsborough	Somerset	Skylands Region	2,740 acres, nature programs, 18 miles of trails, greenhouse with orchids, outdoor sculpture gallery
Elizabeth D. Kay Environmental Center	Chester Township	Morris	Gateway Region	website, operated by the County, 223 acres
Essex County Environmental Center	Roseland	Essex	Gateway Region	website, located in West Essex Park, 1,360 acres of wetlands preserve along the Passaic River
Fernbrook Farms Environmental Education Center	Chesterfield Township	Burlington	Delaware River Region	website located in Chesterfield Township, New Jersey on 230 acres of historic preserved farmland and education center, field trips, homeschool programs and after school programs
Flat Rock Brook Nature Center	Englewood	Bergen	Gateway Region	150-acre preserve and education center
Forest Resource Education Center	Jackson Township	Ocean	Shore Region	website, over 900 acres, programs about the forest, 8 miles of trails
Great Swamp Outdoor Education Center	Chatham	Morris	Gateway Region	website, 44 acres, operated by the County, natural history of the Great Swamp National Wildlife Refuge
Greater Newark Conservancy's Urban Environmental and Ecological Center	Newark	Essex	Gateway Region	Themed gardens, pond, greenhouse, environmental programs and outreach
Huber Woods Environmental Center	Locust	Monmouth	Shore Region	website
Island Beach State Park Nature Center	Berkeley Township	Ocean	Shore Region	Operated seasonally by the Conserve Wildlife Foundation of New Jersey
Jakes Branch County Park	Beachwood	Ocean	Shore Region	website, 400 acres, nature center exhibits about the history and natural surroundings of the Pine Barrens through informational exhibits, live animals and environmental programs
James A. McFaul Environmental Center	Wyckoff	Bergen	Gateway Region	website, 81 acres, waterfowl pond, bird shelters, boardwalk, nature trail, memorial gazebo, and natural science exhibits, operated by the County
Lawrence Nature Center	Lawrence	Mercer	Delaware River Region	website, 45-acre township-owned property features a stream, forest, meadow, network of trails and a community nature center
Liberty State Park Nature Center	Jersey City	Hudson	Gateway Region	Natural history and ecology of the Hudson River estuary
Lighthouse Center for Natural Resource Education	Ocean Township	Ocean	Shore Region	website, 194 acres, habitat includes maritime forest, salt marsh, two tidal streams and a freshwater impoundment
Lorrimer Sanctuary	Franklin Lakes	Bergen	Gateway Region	14 acres, operated by the New Jersey Audubon Society
Manasquan Reservoir Environmental Center	Howell	Monmouth	Shore Region	1,204 acre park, 5 mile perimeter trail around the reservoir, center focus is wetlands ecology and wildlife and habitat protection
Meadowlands Environment Center	Lyndhurst	Bergen	Gateway Region	Operated by Ramapo College of New Jersey, wetlands trails and education programs
Merrill Creek Reservoir	Harmony Township	Warren	Skylands Region	650-acre artificial lake surrounded by 290 acres of protected woodland and fields, visitor center exhibits, environmental education programs
Nature Center of Cape May	Cape May	Cape May	South Jersey	Operated by the New Jersey Audubon Society, features a gallery with exhibits from local artists, aquariums, a second story viewing deck and a third story viewing tower
New Weis Center for Education, Arts & Recreation	Ringwood	Passaic	Gateway Region	website, 152-acre environmental, nature and education center; located in the former Weis Ecology Center
Palmyra Cove Nature Park	Palmyra	Burlington	Delaware River Region	website, 250 acres on the Delaware River just south of the Tacony Palmyra Bridge
Paws Farm Nature Center	Mount Laurel	Burlington	Delaware River Region	website, owned by the Town, 9 acres, farm and other animals, children's themed play areas, trails
Plainsboro Preserve	Plainsboro	Middlesex	Gateway Region	Environmental education center operated by the New Jersey Audubon Society, almost 1000 acres, 5 miles of trails, 50-acre McCormack Lake
Poricy Park Nature Center	Middletown	Monmouth	Shore Region	250-acre (100 ha) nature preserve and park, known for its Cretaceous era fossil shell beds
Pyramid Mountain Natural Historic Area	Montville	Morris	Gateway Region	website, operated by the County, over 1,500 acres, visitor center features interactive exhibits about the history and wildlife of the area
Rancocas Nature Center	Mount Holly	Burlington	Delaware River Region	website, situated on a 210-acre piece of Rancocas State Park, features 3 miles of hiking trails
Reeves-Reed Arboretum	Summit	Union	Gateway Region	13.5 acres, arboretum and gardens, nature education programs
Ridgefield Nature Center	Ridgefield	Bergen	Gateway Region	website, information, 5 acres
Rifle Camp Park	Woodland Park	Passaic	Gateway Region	225 acres, operated by the County, adjacent to Garret Mountain Reservation, features the John Crowley Nature Center and Astronomical Observatory
Scherman Hoffman Wildlife Sanctuary	Bernardsville	Somerset	Skylands Region	276 acres, Hoffman Center for Conservation and Environmental Education operated by the New Jersey Audubon Society
Schiff Nature Preserve	Chatham	Morris	Gateway Region	423 acres, 14 miles of trails, nature center, education programs
Scotland Run Park Nature Center	Clayton	Gloucester	Delaware River Region	website, operated by the County, over 1000 acres, 80 acre Wilson Lake
Somerset County Environmental Education Center	Basking Ridge	Somerset	Skylands Region	425-acre Lord Stirling Park, ecosystem of the area around the Great Swamp National Wildlife Refuge
Stony Brook-Millstone Watershed Association	Hopewell Township	Mercer	Delaware River Region	Watershed Center for environmental education on the 930-acre preserve
Tenafly Nature Center	Tenafly	Bergen	Gateway Region	Over 7 miles of trails throughout nearly 400 wooded acres and education center
Trailside Nature & Science Center	Mountainside	Union	Gateway Region	Located in the 2,065-acre Watchung Reservation
Warren E. Fox Nature Center	Mays Landing	Atlantic	South Jersey	website, located in Estell Manor Park, operated by the County, exhibits of natural history, Native Americans, local industry
Washington Crossing State Park Nature Center	Titusville	Mercer	Delaware River Region	3,100-acre park, includes the site of Washington's crossing of the Delaware at Johnsons Ferry,
Wells Mills Nature Center	Waretown	Ocean	Shore Region	website, located in Wells Mills County Park, over 900 acres of pine and oak forest in the Pine Barrens
The Wetlands Institute	Stone Harbor	Cape May	South Jersey	6,000 acres (24 km²) of protected wetlands, aquarium, wildlife art and carvings, bird observation tower
Whittemore Wildlife Sanctuary	Oldwick	Hunterdon	Skylands Region	website, 180 acres, features the Roving Nature Center and 11 miles of trails for hiking, dog walking and horseback riding
Woodford Cedar Run Wildlife Refuge	Medford	Burlington	Delaware River Region	website, 171 acres, includes Elizabeth Woodford Nature Center with hands-on exhibits, outdoor animal area with over 60 native animals, wildlife rehabilitation hospital
