= Pete Dunne (author) =

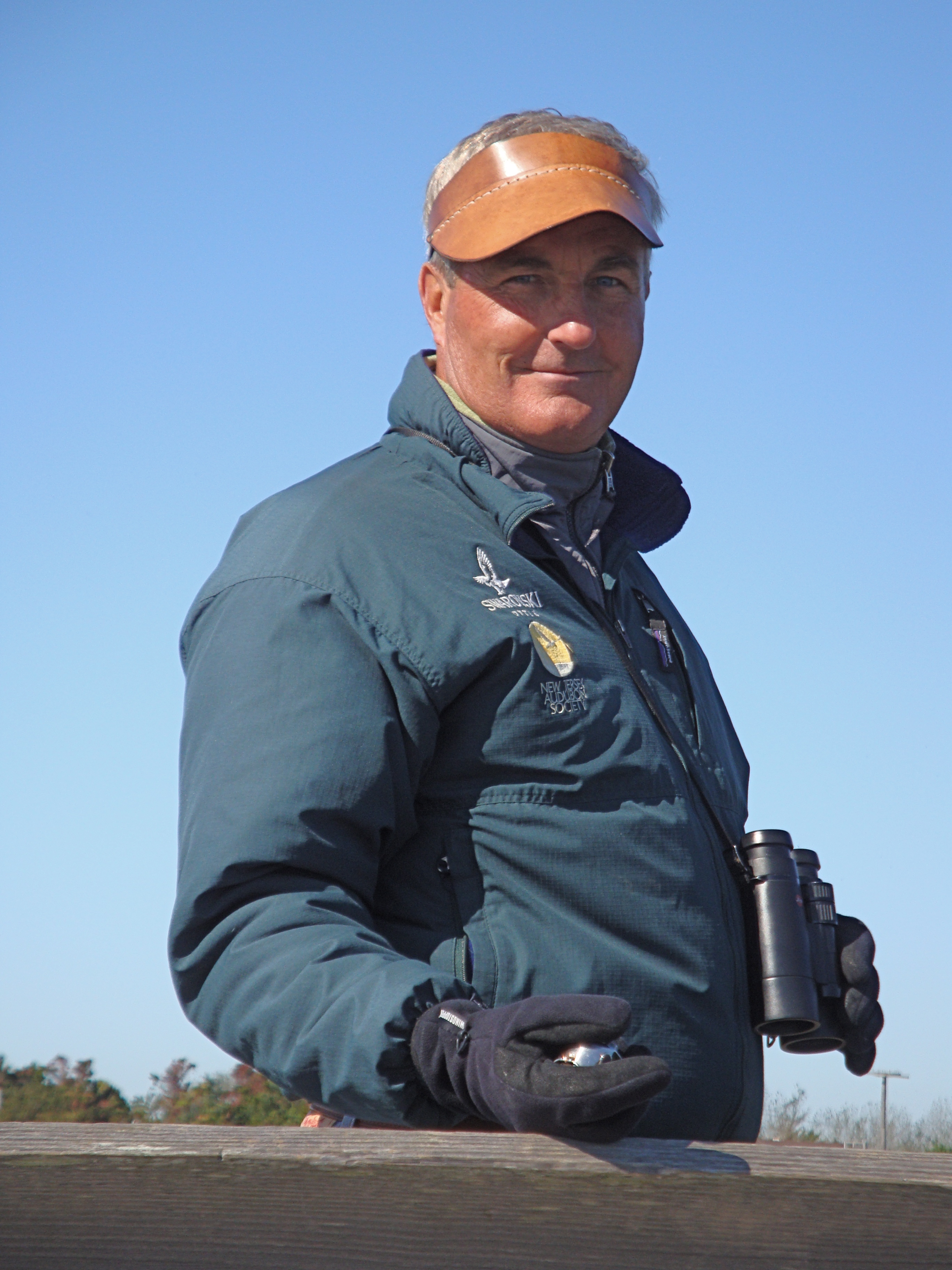
Dunne on the Cape May Hawkwatch platform during the 2009 migration season

Pete Dunne (born September 16, 1951) is an American author who writes about natural history and birding. He is also the founder of the World Series of Birding, as well as the former director of the Cape May Bird Observatory, Birding Ambassador for the New Jersey Audubon Society, and former publisher of New Jersey Audubon magazine. His articles have appeared in most major American birding publications, including Birder's World, Birding, Bird Watcher's Digest, and WildBird, as well as in The New York Times. In 2001, he received the Roger Tory Peterson Award from the American Birding Association for lifetime achievement in promoting the cause of birding.

== Selected books ==
- Tales of a Low-Rent Birder
- More Tales of a Low-Rent Birder
- The Feather Quest: A North American Birder's Year
- Hawks in Flight: A Guide to Identification of Migrant Raptors (with David Sibley and Clay Sutton)
- The Wind Masters: Lives of North American Birds of Prey
- Before the Echo: Essays on Nature
- Hawk Watch, A Guide for Beginners
- Pete Dunne on Bird Watching: The How-to, Where-to, and When-to of Birding
- Pete Dunne's Essential Field Guide Companion: A Comprehensive Resource for Identifying North American Birds
- The Art of Pishing: How to Attract Birds by Mimicking Their Calls
- Prairie Spring: A Journey Into the Heart of a Season
- The Art of Bird Finding
- Bayshore Summer: Finding Eden in a Most Unlikely Place
- Arctic Autumn: A Journey To Season's Edge
