= World Series of Birding =

Annual birding competition

The World Series of Birding is an annual birding competition organised by the New Jersey Audubon Society since 1984. Participating teams compete to identify the greatest number of bird species by sight or sound in a 24-hour period. The event is run as a way of drawing attention to birding as a sport, the migration of birds, and as a fundraiser for conservation efforts. The event is primarily run within New Jersey however some parts of the competition are run internationally over the internet.

There are three levels of competition, each designed to accommodate teams of differing ages and expertise.

- Bird Conservation Challenge (Level I): teams of 3–6 members, all at least 18 years of age. This is the primary competitive event of the World Series of Birding. Teams are required to create a webpage introducing their team, their cause, and give information about how people may pledge to the team.
- New Jersey Audubon Ambassador Challenge (Level II): teams of any size and age. Intended for teams competing for fun and as a means to raise funds for the New Jersey Audubon Society.
- Zeiss Youth Birding Challenge (Level III): teams of 3–6 members, all of age 6–18. Intended to engage school children in competitive birding. This challenge is split into 4 divisions based on school grade and different rules apply for each division.

== Awards ==
There are a series of awards offered for the Level I and Level III challenges. They each support different achievements and ways of competing. There are no awards for the Level II challenge as this is a non-competitive challenge intended for fun and raising money for the New Jersey Audubon Society.

The awards for the Level I challenge are only eligible for teams with all members above 19 years of age and can be won by teams competing from any area of New Jersey. The awards are as follows:

- Urner-Stone Cup - 1st place. Presented to the team with the highest overall number of species.
- Stone Award - 2nd place. Presented to the team with the second-highest overall number of species.
- Stearns Award - 3rd place. Presented to the team with the third-highest overall number of species.
- Big Stay Award. Presented to the team with the highest number of species identified from a single location.
- Wakefern Food Corp./ShopRite LGA Award. Presented to the team with the highest species "par" for a single county. The team's total is compared to a set "par" value, and the team with the highest percentage of the "par" wins the award.
- Cape May County Award. Presented to the team with the highest total species within Cape May County.
- Cape Island Cup. Presented to the team with the highest total species south of the Cape May Canal.
- Carbon Footprint Challenge. Presented to the team with the highest total species with zero carbon footprint (i.e. the team travels by foot, bicycle, rowing, etc.)

The awards for the Level III challenge are given based on division, which is based on school grade. They are as follows:

- Zeiss Youth Division A Challenge. Presented to the team with the highest total species within Elementary School Grades 1 through 5.
- Zeiss Youth Division B Challenge. Presented to the team with the highest total species within Middle School Grades 6 through 8.
- Zeiss Youth Division C - Peter Dunne Future Leaders in Birding Award. Presented to the team with the highest total species within High School Grades 9 through 12.
- Zeiss Youth Division D - Carbon Free Kids Award. Presented to the team with the highest total species in Grades 6 through 12 with zero carbon footprint.

No award offered in the World Series of Birding involves a cash prize. The competition is primarily intended as an awareness and fundraising event for bird conservation.

== History ==
The idea for the World Series of Birding came from Pete Dunne, one of America's foremost authors on birding and natural history, and former longtime director of the Cape May Bird Observatory. The first World Series of Birding was held on May 19, 1984, and the winning team included Dunne, David Sibley (author of the renowned The Sibley Guide to Birds), the late Pete Bacinski (former director of NJ Audubon's Owl Haven Nature Center and Sandy Hook Bird Observatory), Bill Boyle (author of A Guide to Bird Finding in New Jersey), and the legendary Roger Tory Peterson (inventor of the modern field guide) and was sponsored by Bird Watcher's Digest. Their total included 201 species, including a fork-tailed flycatcher— tropical species rarely seen anywhere in the United States, let alone New Jersey.

Since the first competition, the World Series has been held annually on a date between May 9 and May 19, which coincides with the height of the spring bird migration through New Jersey. Winning tallies have ranged from a low of 182 species in 1985 to a high of 231 species in 2003 for the team sponsored by Nikon Sport Optics and the Delaware Valley Ornithological Club (DVOC). The event has steadily gained in popularity over the years; in 1984, 13 teams took part, compared with over 60 in 2006. Over the years, the World Series of Birding has raised more than $9,000,000 for bird conservation.

In 2007, filmmaker Jason Kessler released his documentary, "Opposable Chums: Guts & Glory at The World Series of Birding," which covered both the history and logistics of the event.

In 2022, Birdability’s “Team Nuthatch” became the first ever team in World Series’ history to be composed entirely of disabled birders.

== Strategies ==
Birding sites in New Jersey used in competition

Most teams that compete throughout the entire state start at midnight in the northern part of the state. During pre-daylight hours, teams often visit sites such as the Great Swamp National Wildlife Refuge that are home to certain kinds of owls, rails, and bitterns that are difficult to hear or see during the day. At daybreak, many teams find themselves in the far northern reaches of New Jersey attempting to find species such as purple finch and common raven that are difficult to find farther south. Between 5–10 a.m., teams often pick up the majority of the species they will see all day. Afterward, teams typically make their way into the central and southern parts of the state to places such as the Edwin B. Forsythe National Wildlife Refuge at Brigantine, Cape May, and Belleplain State Forest. After dusk, teams continue to search for the nocturnal species they may have missed at the start of the day but must be at the "finish line" at Cape May Point State Park by midnight, or face stiff penalties.

Crucial to the success of any serious World Series effort is scouting for species in the days and weeks prior to the event. Most teams will have staked out desirable species (often nesting birds that can be reliably found on the day of competition) in advance to minimize the time they have to spend looking for any one species in particular. Additionally, teams should maximize the number of different habitats they visit (e.g., saltwater marshes, Canadian Zone woodlands, pine forests, beaches, etc.), as different species frequent different habitats. Finally, teams should plan their route to maximize time spent birding and minimize time spent driving.

For more information on route planning and strategy, see Pete Dunne's "Blueprint for a Big Day," the World Series of Birding Discussion Forum, and the scouting notes of the Nikon/DVOC team that has won the World Series five out of the last eight years. All can be found under External Links.

== Identifying bird species ==
In order for a species to be counted as identified, the bird must be found alive, wild, and unrestrained. Wild birds that are sick, injured, or oiled may also be counted. Eggs do not count as birds. Identified species are logged using the eBird online bird database platform from the Cornell Lab of Ornithology. This allows teams to record written descriptions, photographs, and audio recordings of identified species. Birds must be identified by at least two team members, and 95% of all birds recorded by a team must be identified by all members of the team. Exceptions to this 95% rule apply to team members who are legally blind (who are not counted when identifying non-vocalizing birds) and members who communicate primarily through American Sign Language (who are not counted when identifying birds that are heard only). The use of online resources and apps is restricted solely to confirming identifications made by team members, thus the skill of individual birders at identifying species is important for teams to succeed in the competition.

== Number of species identified ==
The total number of bird species identified by each team can vary widely due to a number of factors, such as weather and atmospheric conditions, the experience and skill of team members, and the location of birding. In the past, teams competing in New Jersey have been able to identify within the range of 48 to 229 unique species, averaging 165 species. In 2020 when the competition was opened to other states along the Atlantic Flyway, the total number of unique species identified in that year's competition was 357. Since 1984, a total of 330 unique species of birds have been identified in New Jersey through the World Series of Birding.

== See also ==
- Big year
- Breeding Bird Survey organised and monitored by the USGS
- List of birdwatchers
- The Big Year, 2011 film
