= Mount Morris Park =

Mount Morris Park may refer to:

- Marcus Garvey Park or Mount Morris Park
- Mount Morris Park Historic District, the neighborhood surrounding Marcus Garvey Park
