= Hawkwatching =

Citizen science activity

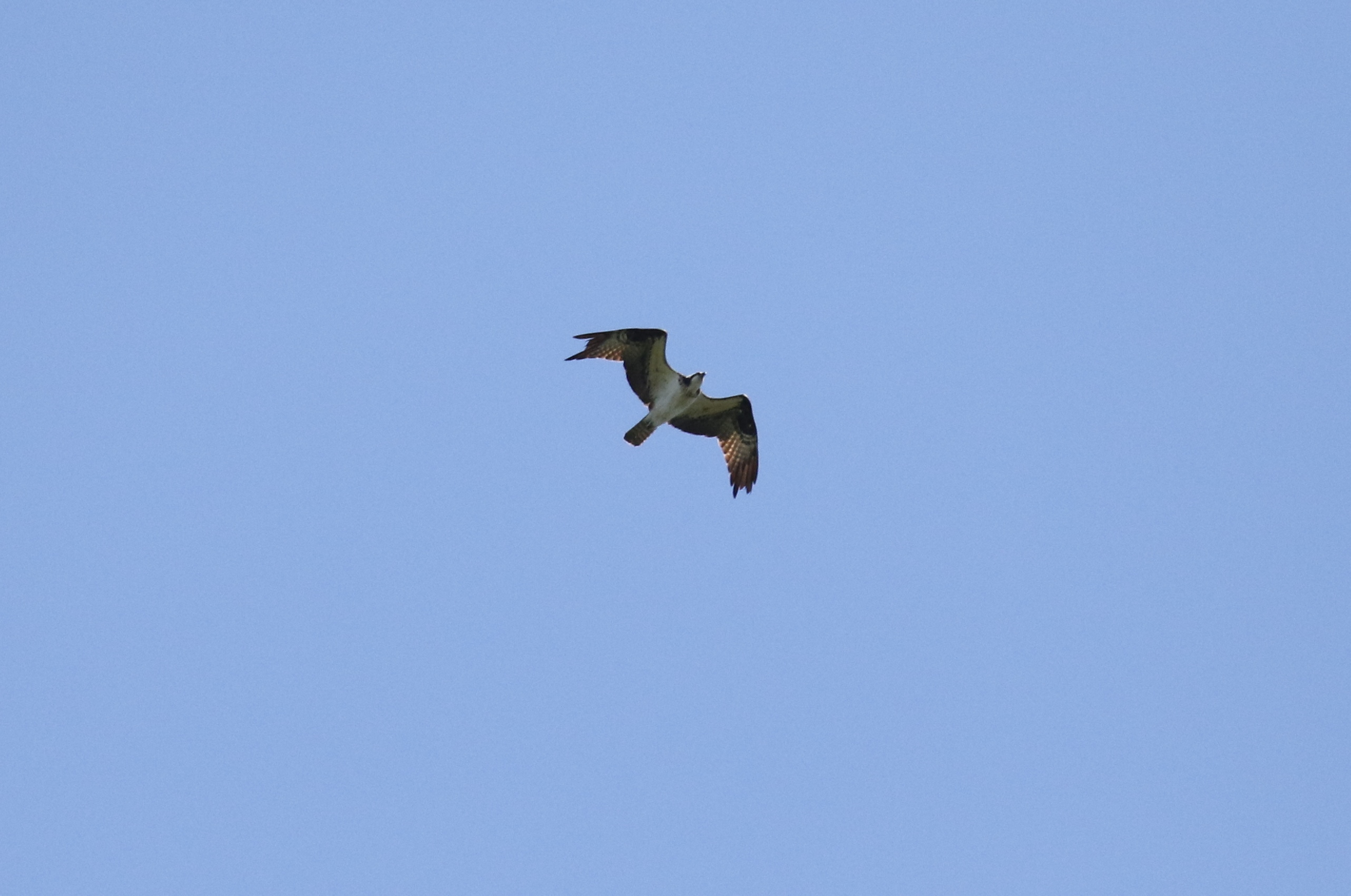
A high flying osprey passes the Allegheny Front Hawk Watch as it migrates south for the winter. The distinct M-shape of the silhouette is a key identifier for this species.

Hawkwatching (sometimes referred to as hawkcounting) is a mainly citizen science activity where experienced volunteers count migratory raptors (birds of prey) in an effort to survey migratory numbers. Groups of hawkwatchers often congregate along well-known migratory routes such as mountain ridges, coastlines and land bridges, where raptors ride on updrafts created by the topography. Hawkwatches are often formally or informally organized by non-profit organizations such as an Audubon chapter, state park, wildlife refuge or other important birding area. Some hawkwatches remain independent of any organizing structure.

The overarching goal of hawkwatch programs is to provide long-term data on regional raptor abundance to help track population trends through time. Many North American hawkwatchers contribute their count data to the Hawk Migration Association of North America at hawkcount.org, a nonprofit website that coordinates hawkwatching data. Data may also contributed to other platforms such as eBird.

== Techniques and equipment ==
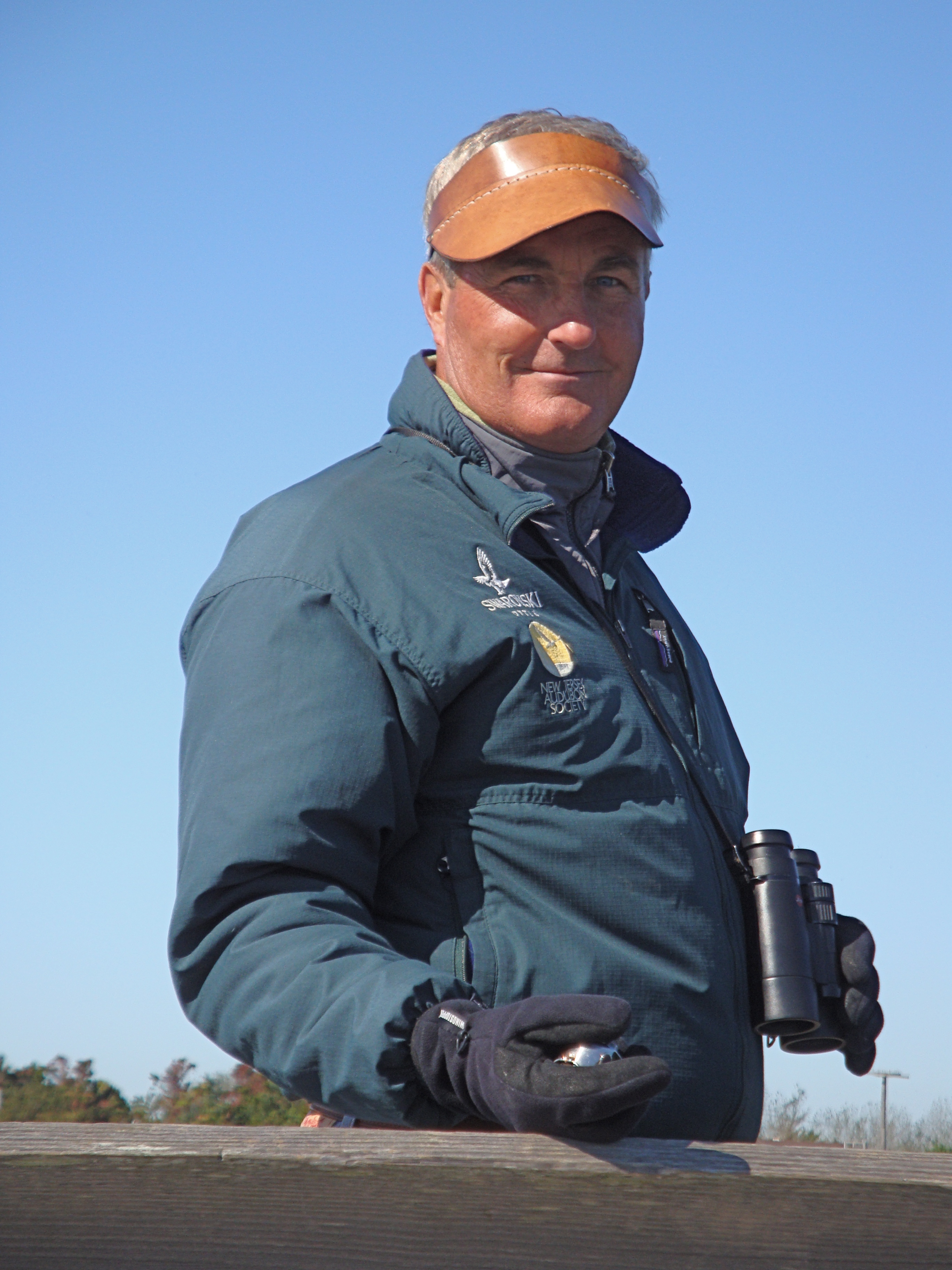
Pete Dunne, director of the Cape May Bird Observatory, on the Cape May Hawkwatch platform

Hawkwatchers usually use binoculars, spotting scopes, and cameras to aid in the identification of flying raptors. Unlike other forms of birding, auditory cues are rare, for many raptors do not vocalize in flight. Instead, hawkwatchers rely on shape, flight behavior and plumage to identify raptors. Several books specialize in learning hawk identification, which is usually challenging because of the distances and the speed at which the raptors migrate. Hawks At A Distance and Hawks From Every Angle by Jerry Liguori help hawkwatchers identify raptors that are high in the sky, at odd angles, and appear unusually small. Unlike typical field guides, these books describe birds' motion, temperament and personality, something most significantly described in Hawks in Flight by Dunne, Sibley, and Sutton as gestalt.

Hawkwatchers who want greater detail on subspecies view photo field guides like Raptors of Western North America and Raptors of Eastern North America by Brian K. Wheeler, and his updated 2018 field guides with paintings, Birds of Prey of the West and Birds of Prey of the East.

== Definitions ==
The word "hawk" in hawkwatching is used to describe common birds of prey. Typical North American raptor families and species are:

- Accipiters – Cooper's hawk (Accipiter cooperii), northern goshawk (Accipiter gentilis), sharp-shinned hawk (Accipiter striatus)
- Buteos – broad-winged hawk (Buteo platypterus), ferruginous hawk (Buteo regalis), red-shouldered hawk (Buteo lineatus), red-tailed hawk (Buteo jamaicensis), rough-legged hawk (Buteo lagopus), short-tailed hawk (Buteo brachyurus), zone-tailed hawk (Buteo albonotatus)
- Crested caracara (Caracara cheriway)
- Eagles – bald eagle (Haliaeetus leucocephalus), golden eagle (Aquila chrysaetos)
- Falcons – American kestrel (Falco sparverius), merlin (Falco columbarius), peregrine falcon (Falco peregrinus), prairie falcon (Falco mexicanus), aplomado falcon (Falco femoralis)
- Kites – Mississippi kite (Ictinia mississippiensis), snail kite, swallow-tailed kite (Elanoides forficatus), white-tailed kite (Elanus leucurus)
- Harrier – northern harrier (Circus cyaneus)
- Osprey – (Pandion haliaetus) (only one surviving species)
- Vultures – turkey vulture (Cathartes aura), black vulture (Coragyps atratus)

Hawk counters are responsible for keeping an accurate tally of the numbers of each species. Each hawkwatch usually designates an official counter responsible for certifying the count's accuracy.

== Organizations ==
The Hawk Migration Association of North America (HMANA) is a membership-based organization committed to the conservation of raptors through the scientific study, enjoyment and appreciation of raptor migration. Hawk Migration Studies is the official journal of HMANA and is printed twice a year, for the spring and fall migrations.

== Notable hawkwatches ==
Hawkcount.org lists over 300 hawk sites, with 173 recently active. In 2015, Hawk Migration Studies reported on 37 sites during spring migration, and 130 sites for fall migration. Noteworthy hawk sites include:

- Allegheny Front Hawk Watch in Cairnbrook, Pennsylvania, which holds the record in the Eastern Flyway for the most golden eagles (386) counted in a year. This record was set in 2015 along with the one-day record of 74 golden eagles on October 24, 2015, which contributed toward the fall seasonal record of 320 golden eagles. (The single day and the fall total golden eagle records were broken in 2018 by Franklin Mt. Hawkwatch.) The Allegheny Front Hawk Watch is the highest hawkwatch in Pennsylvania.
- Corpus Christi Hawkwatch, just north of Corpus Christi, Nueces County, Texas sits on the highest point in the county overlooking the Nueces River delta, records raptors from three major flyways and vagrants from Mexico. Each fall, the watch records more Mississippi Kites, Swallow-tailed Kites, Harris's Hawks, Broad-winged Hawks, Swainson's Hawks, White-tailed Hawks, Zone-tailed Hawks, Crested Caracaras, Aplomado Falcons, and Turkey Vultures than any other hawkwatch in the United States and Canada.

It also annually records over 300 Peregrine Falcons, over 100 Merlins, and over 1,000 American Kestrels. Rarities seen include Common Black Hawk, Ferruginous Hawk, Gray Hawk, Northern Goshawk, and Hook-billed Kite. Seasonal totals regularly exceed 100,000 raptors and range upward to over 1,000,000.

- Franklin Mt. Hawkwatch in Oneonta, New York, broke the one-day record for golden eagles with 128 counted on October 25, 2018, contributing to a new seasonal record of 323 golden eagles for the fall season for the entire Eastern Flyway.
- Hawk Mountain Sanctuary in Kempton, Pennsylvania, has hawk migration data posted on hawkcount.org dating back to 1934.
- Florida Keys Hawkwatch at Hammock Park State Park, Little Crawl Key, Florida records more Peregrine Falcons than any other watch in the United States, with over 4,000 Peregrines in the two-month watch seasons in 2013, 2014, and 2015. Its daily record of Peregrines was 1,506 on October 10, 2015.
- Tussey Mountain Hawk Watch in State College, Pennsylvania, recorded the highest number of golden eagles in the Eastern Flyway for a spring count with 239 in 2015.
- Veracruz River of Raptors in Veracruz, Mexico boasts the largest counts of migratory raptors worldwide with between four and six million raptors counted each fall. Nearly the entire world population of some raptor species including Broad-winged Hawk, Swainson's Hawk, and Mississippi Kite pass through Veracruz during the autumn migration
- Niagara Peninsula Hawkwatch has 50 years of spring hawkwatching data uploaded to hawkcount.org and has averaged 500 plus observation hours per season since 1980.
