= Carl Francis Pilat =

American landscape architect (1876–1933)

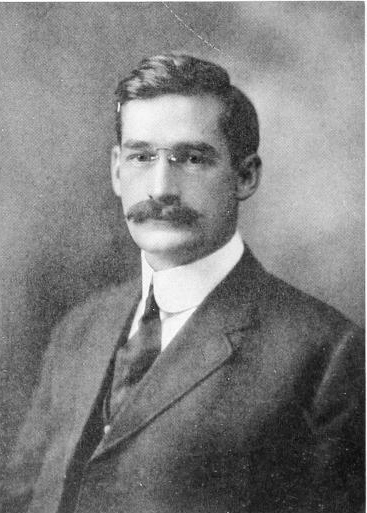

Carl Francis Pilat (1876–1933), the nephew of Ignatz Anton Pilát, was an organizing member of the firm of Hinchman & Pilat, then landscape architect for the city parks 1913–1918. While with the city, Carl Pilat designed Astoria Park, the Telewan project (later named Jacob Riis Park) in Queens, both around 1913, and redesigns of Union Square and Isham, Gaynor memorial and Silver Lake parks. Pilat drew landscape designs for estates of C. H. Dodge, Spencer Trask, E. M. Shepard, E. K. Cone and the Baroness von Zimmerman, some of the gardens at what later became the Reeves-Reed Arboretum in Summit, New Jersey, and the Theodore Vail memorial in Parsippany, New Jersey.

== Early life and education ==
Pilat was born on August 19, 1876, in Ossining, New York. His father was Carl F. Pilat (1818-1892) and his mother Anna Enzinger Pilat (1835-1915). They had six children. His father was a landscaper and worked with his brother Ignatz Anton Pilát who was Chief Gardener and Superintendent of Central Park from 1863 to 1870.

He received an AB from the College of Agriculture of Cornell University in 1900.

== Career ==
He worked for the firm Hinchman & Pilat from 1900 to 1913. He was landscape architect of the New York City Parks Department on 17 June 1913 to 11 April 1918. When work on Central Park slowed down, Pilat became the chief landscape gardener of the city of New York. He planned improvements for many parks, including Washington Square Park, Battery Park, New York City Hall Park, Mount Morris and Prospect Parks. Later he designed numerous estates in New Jersey, Long Island and in Westchester County, New York. In 1914 Pilat completed the plans for a park along the shore of the East River at Astoria.

== Memberships ==
- Fellow of the American Society of Landscape Architects
- Member of the Phi Delta Gamma fraternity
- Member of the Rotary clubs in New York

== Death ==
He died on May 26, 1933, in Hasbrouck Heights, New Jersey and was buried at the Hackensack Cemetery.

== Work ==
=== Public work ===
- Memorial park to Theodore Newton Vail in New Jersey

=== Residencies ===
- Greyston in Riverdale, Bronx, for Cleveland Hoadley Dodge
- Erlowest in Lake George, for Edward M. Shepard
