= Fernbrook Farms =

United States historic place

- Fernbrook Historic District
- U.S. National Register of Historic Places
- U.S. Historic district
- New Jersey Register of Historic Places
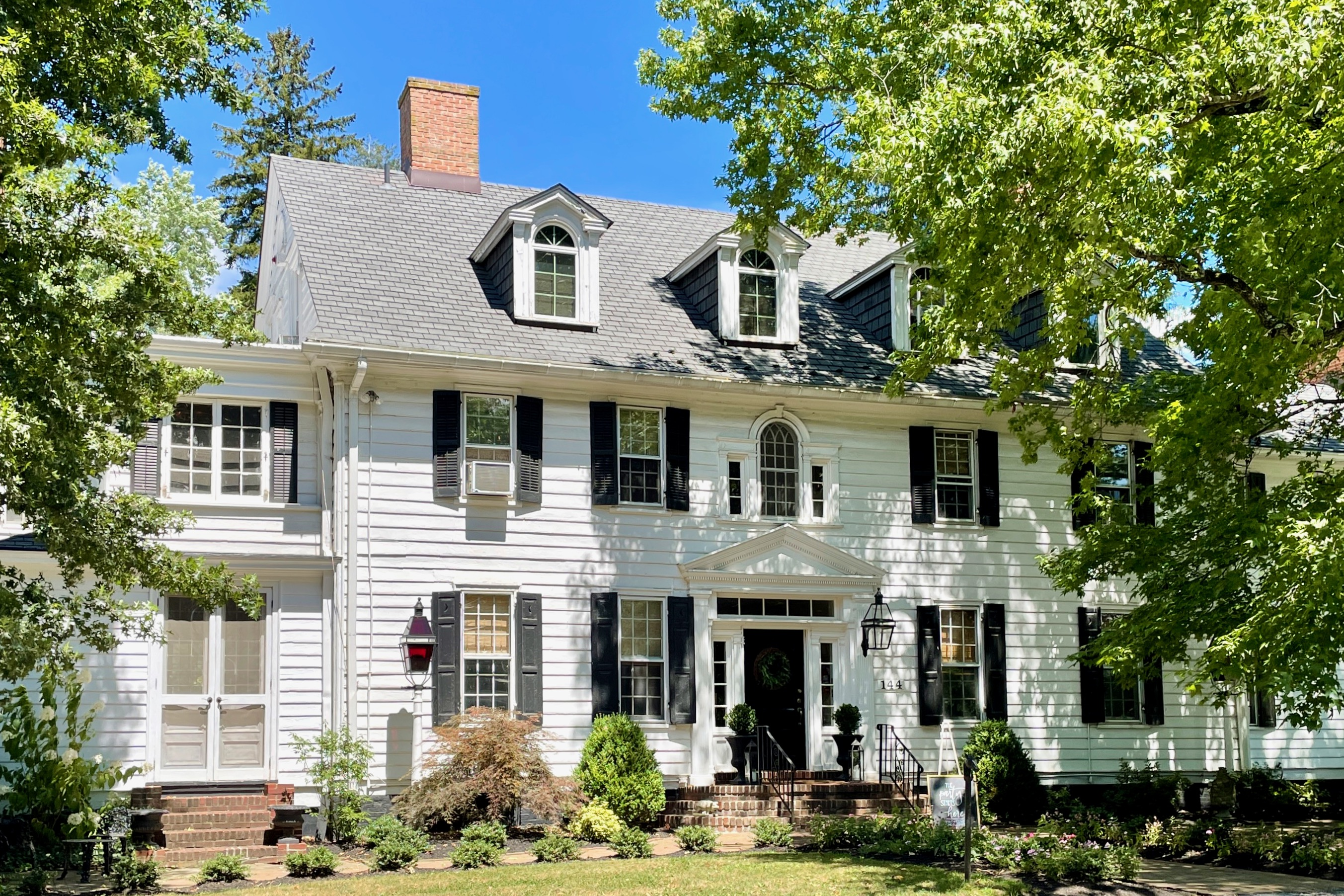
- John Newbold House, c. 1761; The Inn at Fernbrook Farms

- Location within Burlington County, New Jersey Location within New Jersey Location within the United States
- Location: 142–150 Bordentown-Georgetown Road; Chesterfield Township, New Jersey
- Coordinates: 40°6′14″N 74°40′37″W
- Area: 111 acres (45 ha)
- Architectural style: Federal, Shingle, Stick, Colonial Revival
- NRHP reference No.: 100007873
- NJRHP No.: 5577

Significant dates
- Added to NRHP: July 7, 2022
- Designated NJRHP: May 16, 2022

Fernbrook Farms is a 230-acre (93 ha) working farm located along County Route 545 (Bordentown-Georgetown Road) in Chesterfield Township in Burlington County, New Jersey. Originally an 18th-century farm, it was briefly a stock breeding farm, known as the New Warlaby Stock Farm, in the 19th century. It now includes an inn, plant nursery, environmental education center, and community-supported agriculture. It was added to the National Register of Historic Places on July 7, 2022, for its significance in architecture and landscape architecture.

== History ==
In 1760, John Newbold acquired 500 acres (200 ha) of farm land along the Fern Brook from his father Michael Newbold. He then built a two and one-half story frame farmhouse for the estate, c. 1761. The house was expanded in 1791 by adding two bays. In 1881, Charles Morgan purchased 290 acres (120 ha) to raise premium breeding cattle. In 1897, John L. Kuser moved there, and in 1899, he purchased the property. After his death in 1937, his son Walter G. Kuser inherited the property. Lawrence Kuser and his wife Susie started living there in 1974.

== Historic district ==
The Fernbrook Historic District is a 111-acre (45 ha) historic district encompassing the core part of the farm. It was added to the National Register of Historic Places on July 7, 2022, for its significance in architecture and landscape architecture. The district has eleven contributing buildings, six contributing structures, and one contributing site. The Federal-style John Newbold House is the main contributing property in the district. A cedar shaked water tower, built c. 1897, provided water pressure and filtration for Morgan's mansion and the formal Colonial Revival gardens.

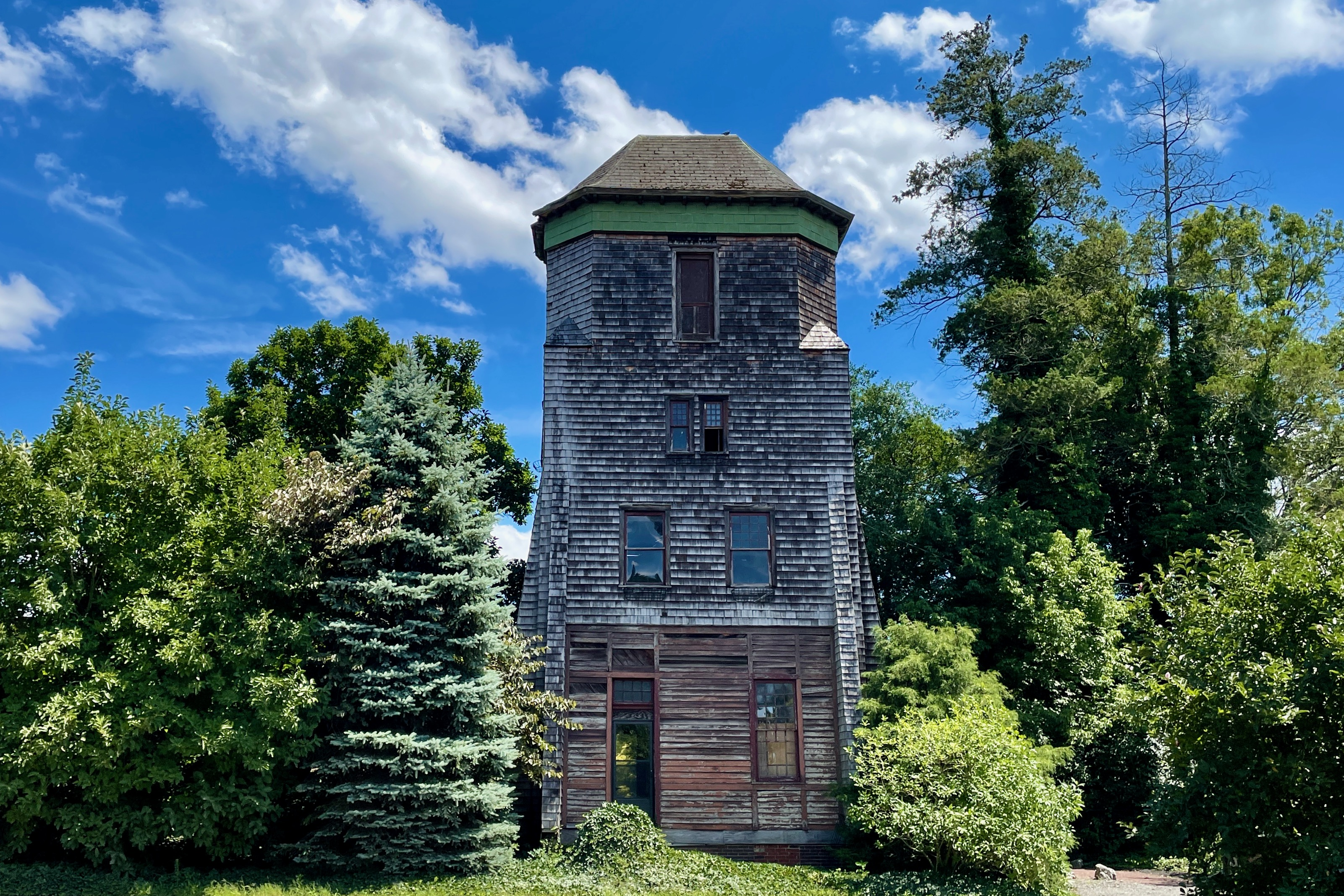
Water tower, the Tankhouse

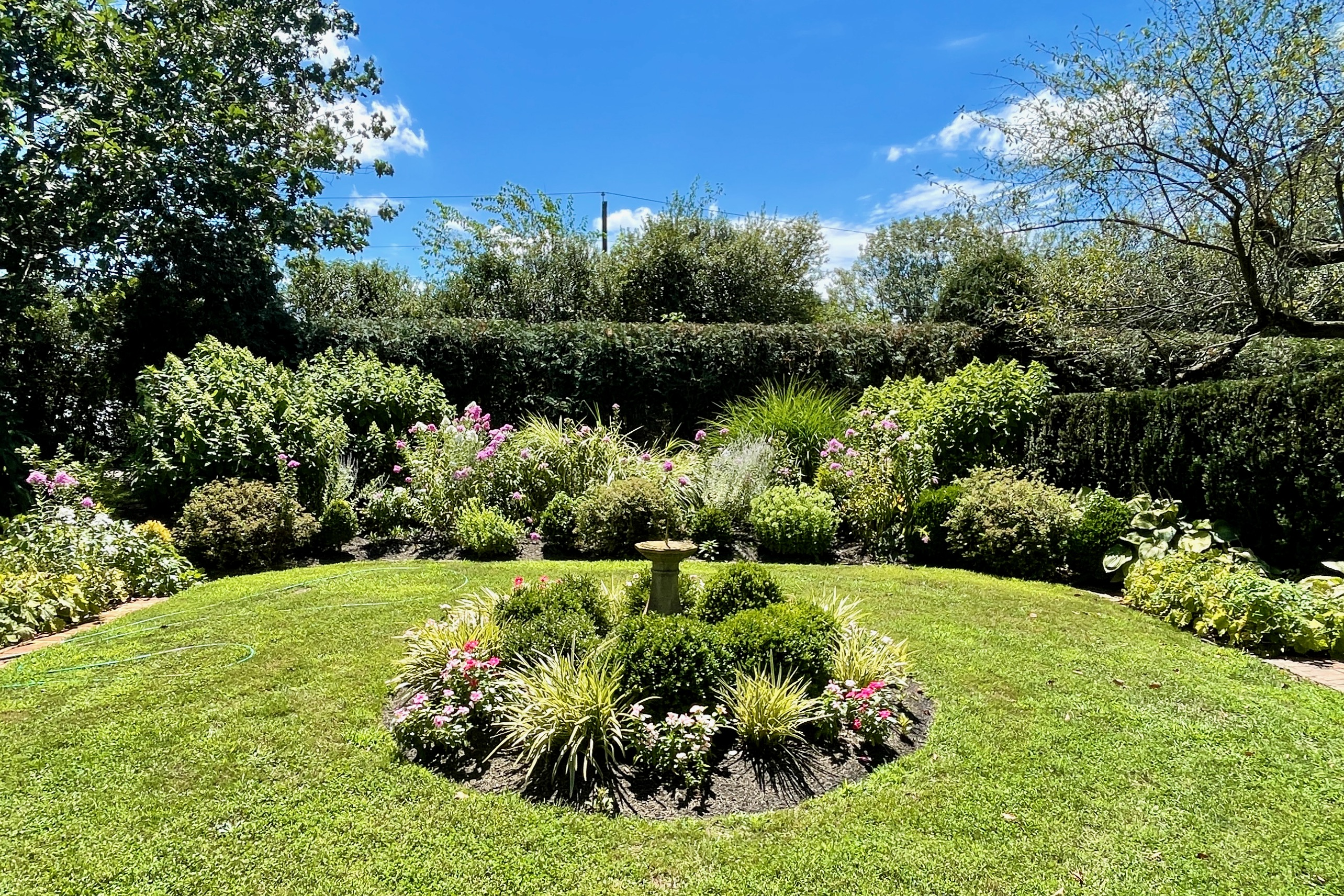
Formal garden with sundial

== Agriculture ==
In 1881, having inherited money, Morgan imported premium breeding cattle from England, paying nearly US$20,000 for them. They were shorthorns of the Booth stock from Warlaby. He renamed the farm, New Warlaby, and established a model breeding farm. However, by 1885, he had sold the cattle to Leslie Combs of Kentucky.

A plant nursery operation was started in the 1970s. A community-supported agriculture (CSA) component was added in 2007.

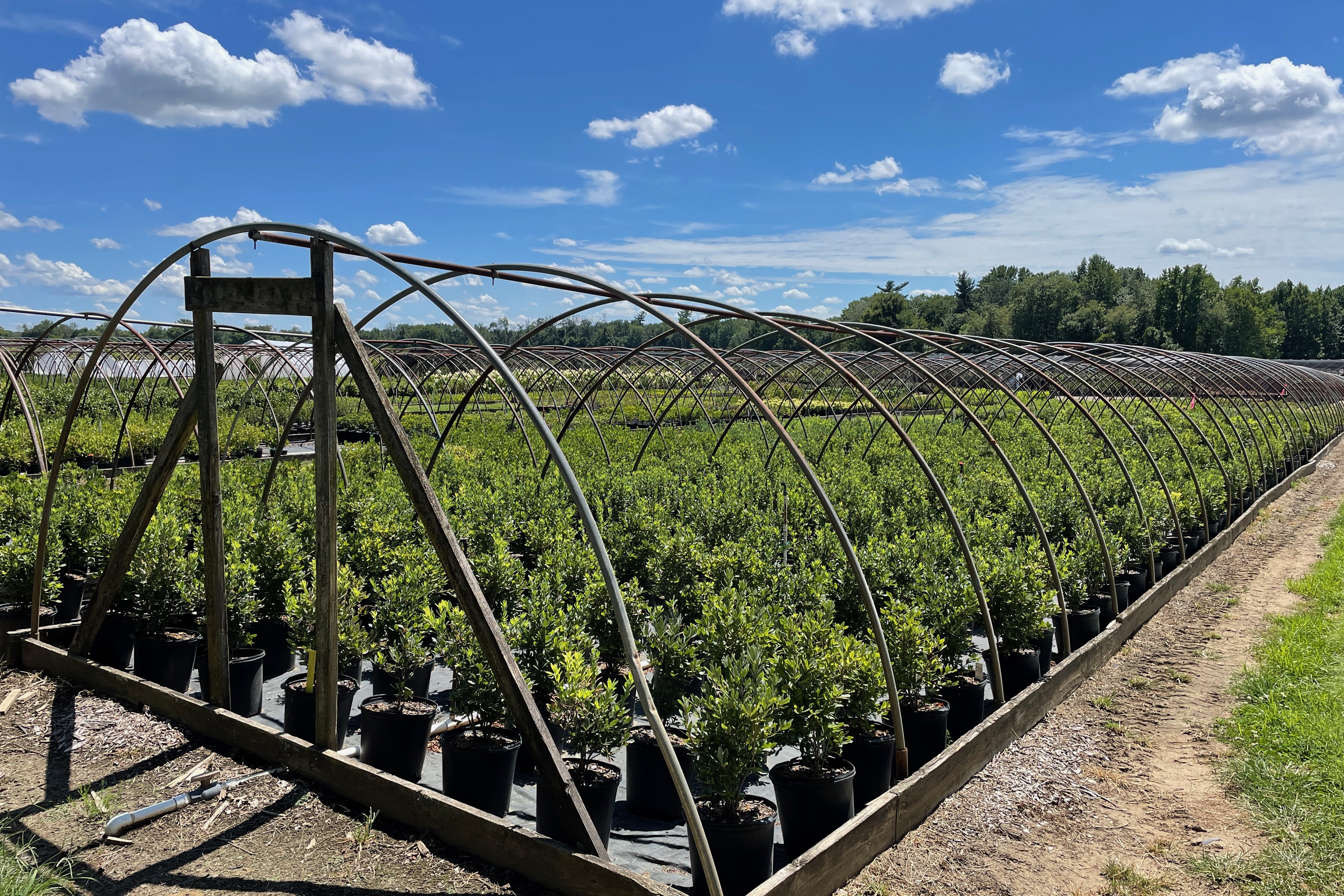
Agricultural fields of the plant nursery

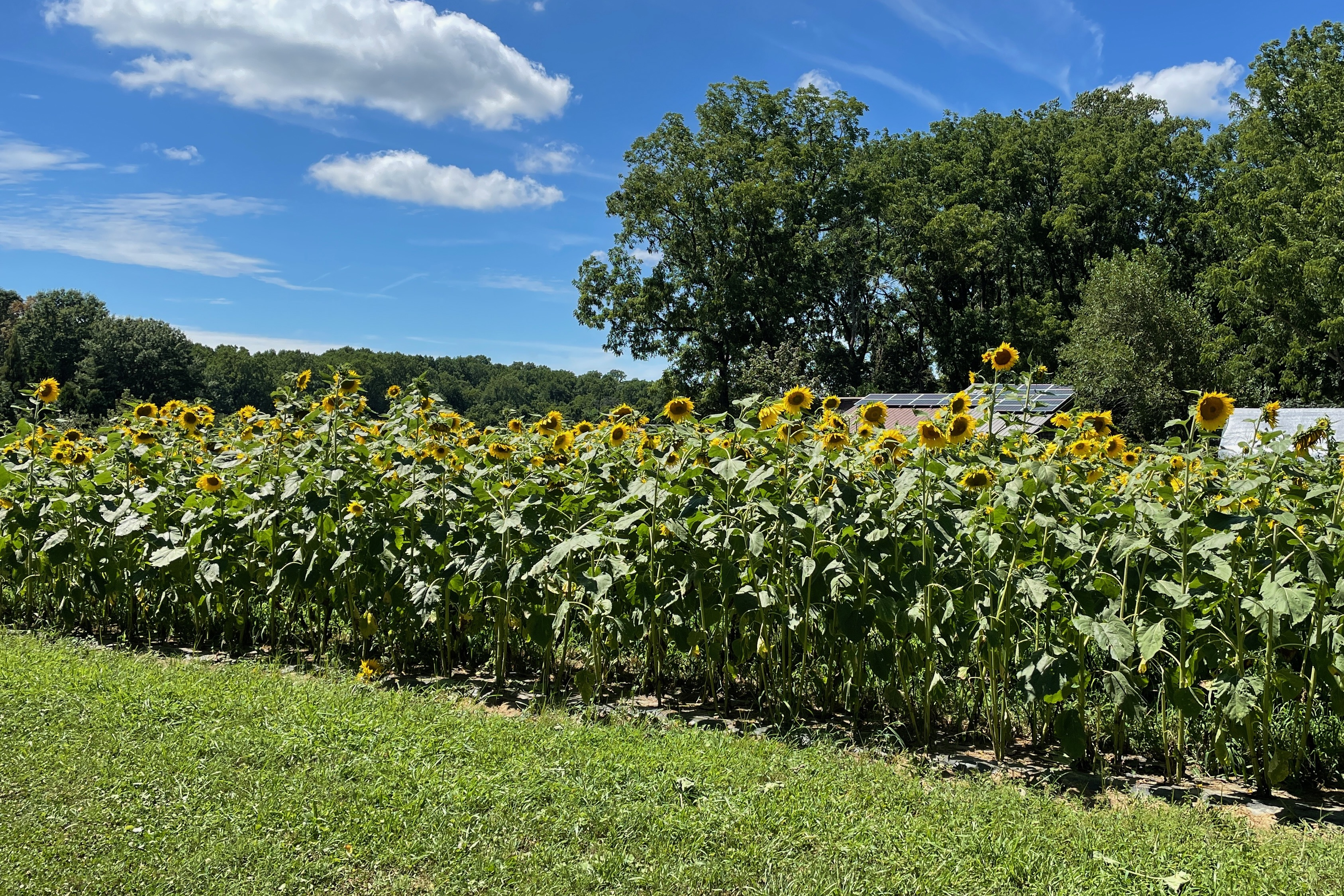
Sunflower field by the CSA farm store

== Education ==
In 2001, Larry and Susie Kuser established an environmental education center on the property.

== See also ==
- Model farm
- National Register of Historic Places listings in Burlington County, New Jersey
- List of the oldest buildings in New Jersey
- List of nature centers in New Jersey
