= Astoria Park =

Public park in Queens, New York

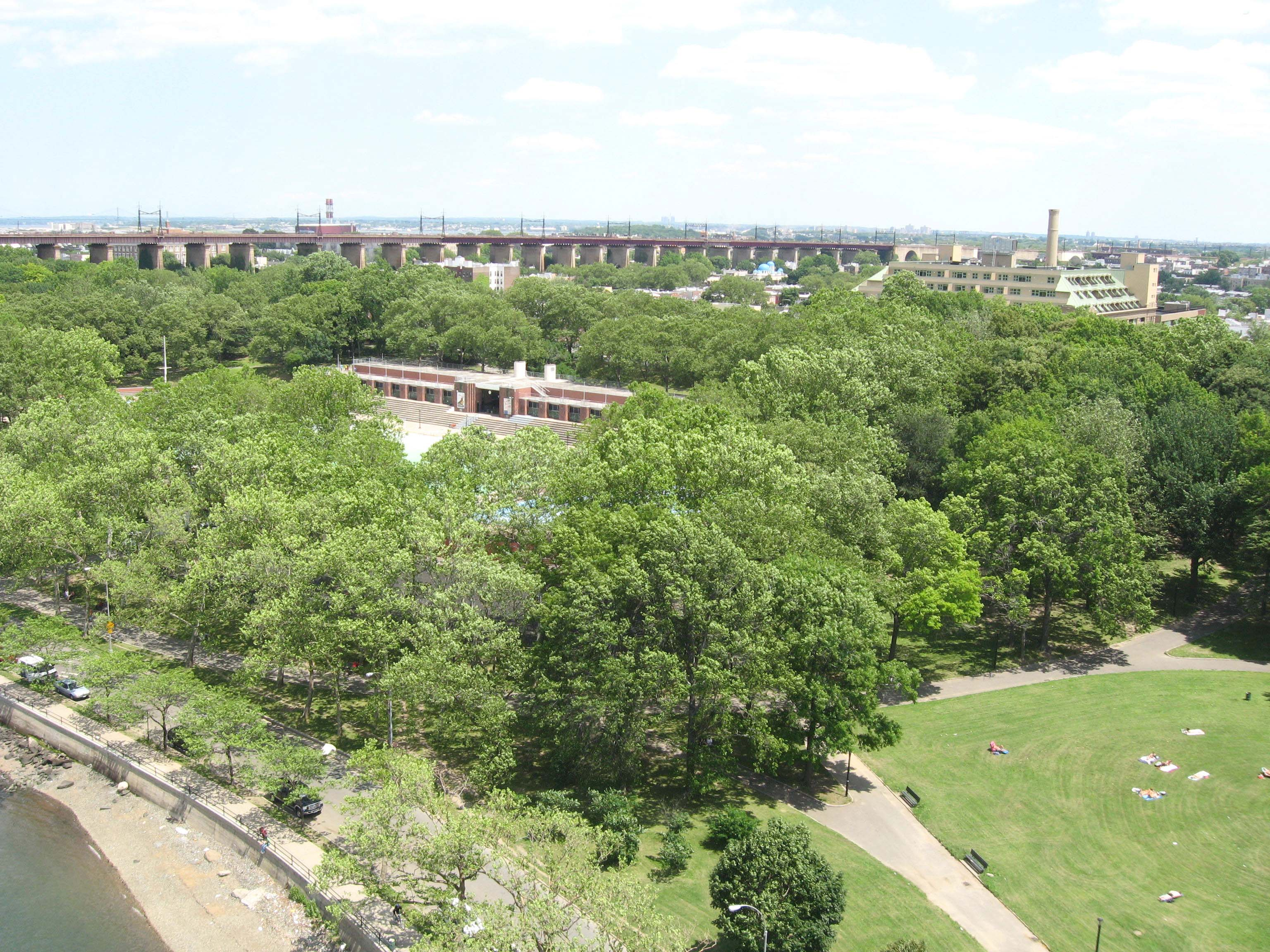
- Astoria Park in June 2008
- Interactive map of Astoria Park
- Type: Urban park
- Location: Astoria, Queens, New York City
- Coordinates: 40°46′46″N 73°55′19″W
- Area: 59.96 acres (24.26 ha)
- Created: 1913
- Operator: NYC Parks
- Public transit: Subway: at Astoria Boulevard; Bus: Q19, Q69, Q100, M60 SBS

New York City Landmark
- Designated: June 20, 2006
- Reference no.: 2196
- Designated entity: Bathhouse facade and pool

Astoria Park is a 59.96-acre (24.26 ha) public park in the Astoria neighborhood of Queens in New York City. The park is situated on the eastern shore of the Hell Gate, a strait of the East River, between Ditmars Boulevard to the north and Hoyt Avenue to the south. The Robert F. Kennedy (Triborough) and Hell Gate Bridges respectively pass over the park's southern and northern sections. Astoria Park contains a playground, a soccer field, a running track, a skate park, and courts for tennis, basketball, and bocce. Astoria Park also includes the Astoria Play Center, which consists of a recreation center and a pool. The park and play center are maintained by the New York City Department of Parks and Recreation (NYC Parks).

Astoria Park was planned in 1905, but the land was not acquired until October 1913. Astoria Park was formally named after the surrounding neighborhood in December 1913, and recreational facilities gradually opened within the park during the next two decades. The pool and bathhouse were designed by John Hatton during a Works Progress Administration project in 1935–1936 and was used for the United States Olympic Trials for swimming during 1936, 1952, and 1964. The park was extensively renovated in the 1980s and the late 2010s. The Astoria Play Center was designated a city landmark by the New York City Landmarks Preservation Commission in 2007.

== Description ==
Astoria Park is in the Astoria neighborhood of Queens in New York City. It is bounded by Astoria Park South, an extension of Hoyt Avenue, to the south; the Hell Gate, a strait of the East River, to the west; Ditmars Boulevard to the north; and 19th Street to the east. The RFK (Triborough) Bridge crosses over the southern section of Astoria Park. The Hell Gate Bridge, carrying Amtrak's Northeast Corridor and the New York Connecting Railroad, crosses over the northern section. The park is separated from the Hell Gate and the East River by a 30-foot-wide (9.1 m) road called Shore Boulevard.

The park covers 59.96 acres (24.26 ha). The southeastern corner of the park under the RFK Bridge, between Hoyt Avenue North and Hoyt Avenue South, extends east to 21st Street. Astoria Park is crossed by numerous paths, of which some are paved in hexagonal blocks, while others contain asphalt paving. Several paths are built on slopes and contain staggered steps. Several entrances are spaced around the perimeter of the park.

In the western portion of the park, along Shore Boulevard, is a memorial dedicated to World War I victims. There is also a plaque commemorating the PS General Slocum, which caught fire and sunk in the Hell Gate in 1904, killing over a thousand people.

=== Recreational facilities ===
Recreational facilities are concentrated in the southern two-thirds of the park, south of 23rd Avenue. The southernmost portion of Astoria Park, at 18th Street and Astoria Park South, contains a 0.25-mile (400 m) running track, which surrounds a soccer field. East of the running track are fourteen tennis courts and a restroom. The tennis court area protrudes slightly under the RFK Bridge. A "tennis landscape" separates the tennis courts from the street. There is a parking lot just north of the running track, underneath the RFK Bridge and at the western end of Hoyt Avenue North. Also underneath the bridge, west of the parking lot, is a 21,500-square-foot (2,000 m^{2}) skate park. New York Road Runners hosts a weekly 3.10-mile Open Run within the park.

The central portion of the park contains the Astoria Pool and Play Center. There are also basketball courts southwest of the pool area, as well as bocce courts and Charybdis Playground north of the pool area. Charybdis Playground sits opposite the Hell Gate from Scylla Point on Wards Island. The two features are named after Scylla and Charybdis, two water hazards described in Homer's Odyssey, and refer to the dangerous whirlpools in the waters of the Hell Gate. Charybdis Playground was named first, in 1997; Scylla Point was named in 2001 after parks commissioner Henry Stern petitioned the federal government to rename what was then known as "Negro Point", in 2001. Charybdis Playground contains a decorated one-story brick restroom. The restroom contains decorative piers protruding from all four corners; glass-block openings; and Art Deco lettering indicating the girls' and boys' restrooms.

=== Astoria Play Center ===
==== Pools ====
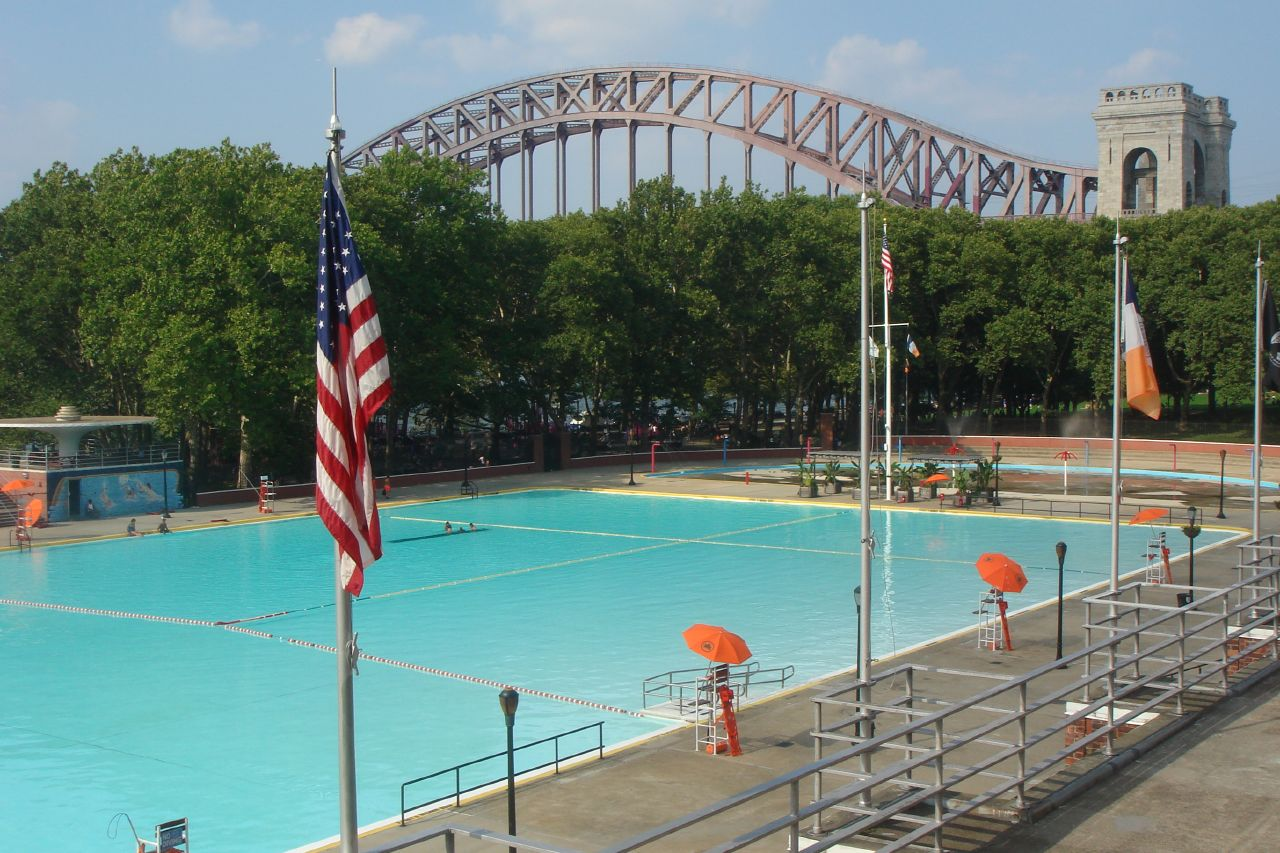
View of the main pool

Astoria Park contains an enclosed elliptical pool area that is aligned north-south, with two pools (formerly three). The main pool is rectangular and measures 330 by 165 feet (101 by 50 m), with a depth of 4 feet (1.2 m) and a surface area of 54,450 square feet (5,059 m^{2}). It was the largest of 11 pools in New York City that were completed by the Works Progress Administration in 1936. At its peak, the pool area was able to fit 6,200 swimmers, and the main pool alone had a capacity of 5,570. The pools hosted swimming trials for three Summer Olympic Games in 1936, 1952, and 1964.

The main pool is flanked by two semicircular pools, each with a 165-foot diameter. The wading pool is north of the main pool and is surrounded by spray spouts. The diving pool to the south was drained and fenced off in the 1980s, and was totally infilled between 2017 and 2019. The still-extant diving board measures 32 feet (9.8 m) tall, with three platforms cantilevered over each other. The diving board, described by Architectural Record as "an example of design for function", allowed four contestants to dive simultaneously: one each from the top and bottom, and two from the middle.

The deck surrounding the pools is made of cement. The deck is surrounded by concrete bleachers and enclosed by a brick perimeter wall topped by a wrought iron fence. There is also a filter house on the western side of the pool area. The filter house contains a balcony that is raised one story above the pool deck and two stories above a plaza to the west. The filter house's balcony has a roof that is designed like a saucer.

==== Bathhouse ====
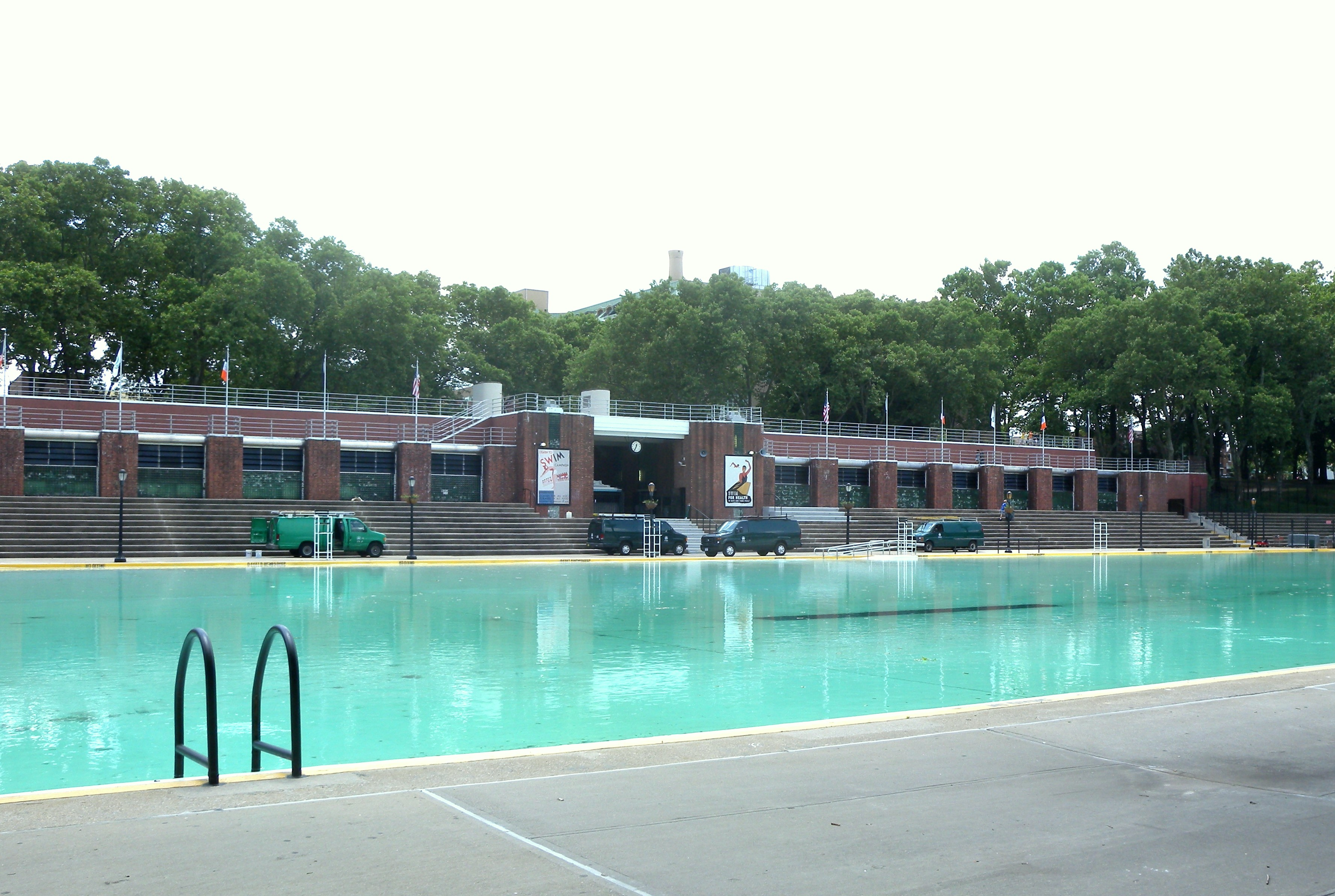
The bathhouse as seen from the pool

The bathhouse was designed by John Hatton. It incorporates both classical motifs, such as brick piers, and modern motifs, such as geometric brickwork. The bathhouse is a U-shaped brick structure west of 19th Street, between 23rd Drive to the north and 23rd Terrace to the south. Pavilions extend north and south of the bathhouse's central lobby. Wings extend eastward into the hillside from the ends of both pavilions. The main entrance plaza is sunken below street level, surrounded by the bathhouse pavilion to the west, the wings to the north and south, and 19th Street to the east. The entrance plaza is accessed via two ramps with steps, which extend north to 23rd Drive and south to 23rd Terrace.

The main entrance is flanked by a pair of stepped-brick piers with glass brick columns set into the middle of each pier. The pool entrance, at the center of the western facade, is also flanked by stepped-brick piers with glass brick columns and contains a clock suspended above the center. As designed, the pool entrance was flanked by two stainless steel sculptures created by Emil Siebern, which depicted female athletes. The lobby between the main and pool entrances is open to the outdoors and contains a brick floor surrounded by bluestone and granite. The ceiling of the lobby contains concrete beams. The octagonal ticket booth at the center of the lobby has a nautical theme, with an outwardly angled terrazzo base, a ticket collector's cage, and a ventilation cupola on the roof. The north and south walls are divided into three bays and contain the women's and men's locker rooms. These bays contain glass bricks at the top and openings or doorways at the bottom. Above the center bays on each side are Art Deco-style aluminum letters indicating the respective genders' locker rooms.

The bathhouse pavilions are similar in design. The east facade is fifteen bays wide, while the west facade is seventeen bays wide. Except for the central bay on each side, there are openings with glass blocks topped by metal louvers; these are separated by fluted brick piers. At the northern and southern ends of the west facade, there are semicircular coves with doorways that lead to the bathhouse's locker rooms. The eastern wings of the bathhouse, to the north and south of the entrance court, each contain two bays of horizontal glass-brick bands. The roof of the bathhouse pavilion doubles as a viewing platform and contains a concrete deck and metal railing. The eastern portion of the roof is higher than the western portion. The roof contains two concrete ventilators above the main entrance. Upon the bathhouse's completion, Architectural Forum praised its use of glass bricks "for privacy and ease of maintenance".

== History ==
The park site formerly contained Pot Cove, a Native American settlement used for maize cultivation and fishing. The name also applies to the small cove next to the park's southwestern corner. The settlement's namesake may have been the 130-foot-long (40 m) Pot Rock within the Hell Gate; the rock was dynamited in 1876 as part of the removal of Hell Gate rocks. There were hills immediately above the Hell Gate shoreline, and several creeks emptied into the cove. One of these was Linden Brook, which flowed along the current path of Astoria Park South and into Pot Cove.

The surrounding land had numerous owners from the 17th to 19th centuries. The tracts were developed with the estates of wealthy businessmen such as Edwin Hoyt, Edward Woolsey, and Henry Barclay. Maps show that some streets had already been laid out on the future park site by the late 19th century. The surrounding Astoria neighborhood was part of the independent city of Long Island City, which was combined into the City of Greater New York in 1898. Augustus D. Juilliard began combining the various properties for the future site of Astoria Park in 1872. (Note: A table of land acquisitions is shown in Geismar 2017, p. 16.) As the lots were purchased, the estates on the site were largely demolished by the 1890s.

=== Creation and early years ===
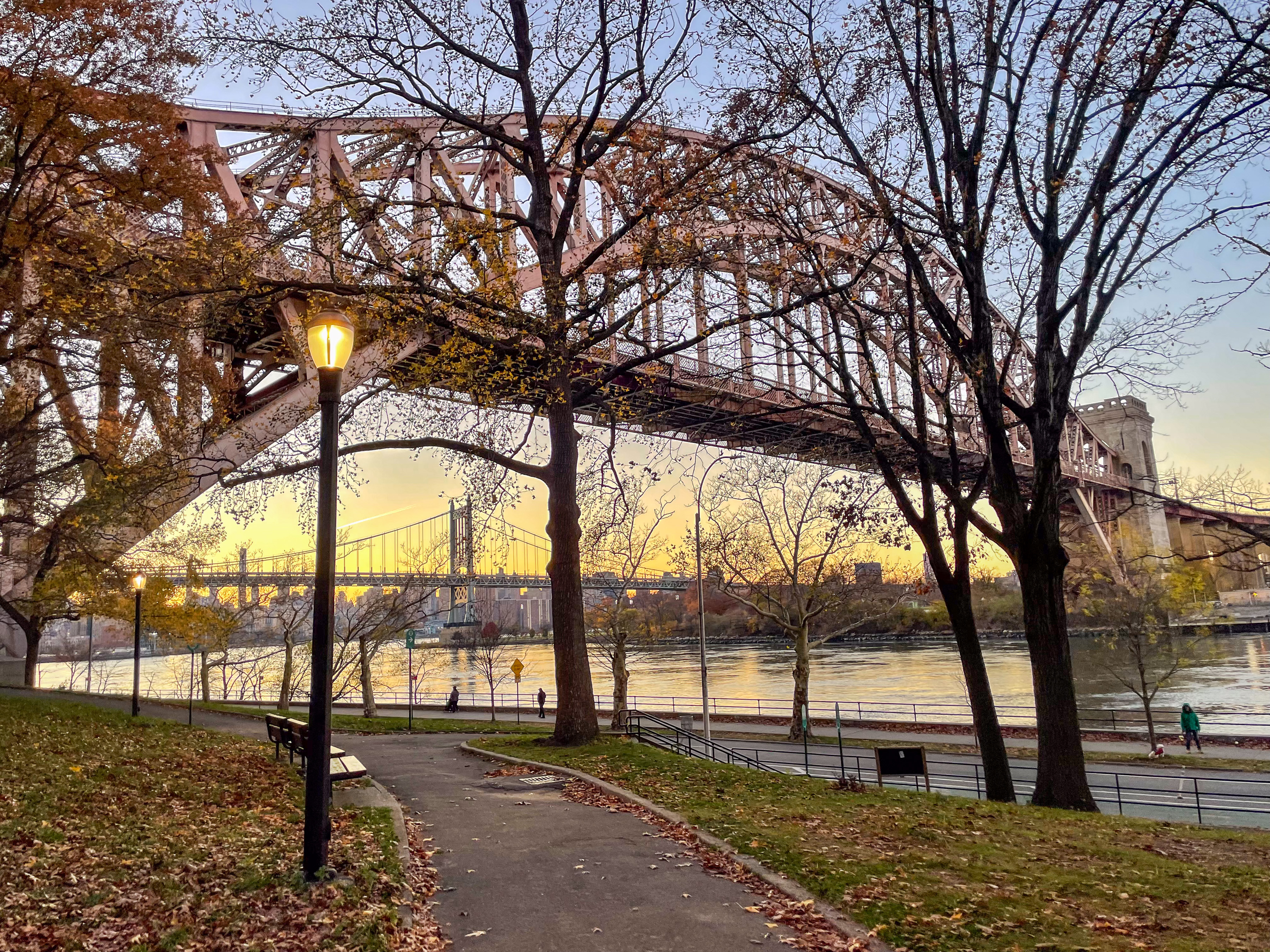
Hell Gate Bridge (foreground) and Triborough Bridge (background) from Astoria Park

The East River Land Company acquired 27 acres (11 ha) south of 24th Avenue (Note: The following historical street names correspond to modern day street names: Ditmars Avenue – Ditmars Boulevard; Potter Avenue – 23rd Avenue; Woolsey Avenue – 24th Avenue; Hoyt Avenue west of 21st Street – Astoria Park South; Barclay Street – 19th Street; Van Alst Avenue – 21st Street) from Augustus Juilliard, as well as 31 acres (13 ha) to the north from James Barclay, in 1905. This was part of the acquisition of some 180 acres (73 ha) on the Hell Gate shorefront, comprising over 2,000 lots. In 1907, the New York Connecting Railroad (NYCN) bought 13,566 square feet (1,260.3 m^{2}) from the East River Land Company for a right-of-way to build the Hell Gate Bridge through Astoria Park's site. The bridge, opened in 1917, was part of a railroad line from the new Pennsylvania Station to New York City's northeastern suburbs. Also in 1907, the city government was slated to pay the East River Land Company $200,000 for nine hundred lots totaling 70 acres (28 ha). However, the city balked on acquiring the land, contending that the selling price was too high and citing the company's decision to grant the NYCN an easement. The city's hesitancy was attributed to the Panic of 1907, which had worsened the city's finances.

By 1913, residents of Manhattan and Long Island City were again calling for the creation of a park along the Astoria waterfront. The site was just north of the Astoria ferry landing, where service ran to Manhattan. That July, the New York City Board of Estimate authorized a park to be laid out on the plot between the East River, Ditmars Boulevard, 19th Street, and Hoyt Avenue. The projected $1.5 million cost would be paid by tax assessments placed on residents of Queens, Brooklyn, and Manhattan, as well as an extra assessment on people living in the immediate area. At the time, the northern portion of the park contained the Barclay mansion, a brick building measuring 54 by 74 feet (16 by 23 m), while the southern portion contained three unidentified structures. A corps of engineers was hired to draw plans for the new park. The city acquired 56.25 acres (22.76 ha) in October 1913, and shortly afterward, the Board of Estimate renamed the park for mayor William Jay Gaynor. Many residents preferred to name the park for the Astoria neighborhood, and it was officially renamed Astoria Park in December 1913.

NYC Parks architect Carl Francis Pilat completed plans for the park in January 1914. It was intended to be the city's first large park with active recreational facilities. These facilities would be in the southern two-thirds of the park, near transit. The southernmost section between 24th and Hoyt Avenues would receive a running track, three baseball diamonds, two grandstands, and a playfield. The center section between 23rd and 24th Avenues would contain tennis courts, playgrounds, wading pool, locker rooms, and storage rooms. The northernmost portion between Ditmars Boulevard and 23rd Avenue would contain a landscape with paths and gardens. The plan also included restoring the old Barclay mansion for use as a meeting room, though it was demolished instead. In its 1914 annual report, NYC Parks reported the city's sinking fund commission, which owned the site, had not yet turned over ownership of the land. Condemnation proceedings were still ongoing at the time. By 1915, NYC Parks reported that Astoria Park was used by thousands of Manhattan residents during Sundays, but that the land was still an unimproved "No Man's Land".

Queens officials announced a plan in 1922 to pave 23rd Avenue and create an ornamental gateway to Astoria Park from that avenue. The same year, NYC Parks announced improvements to the section between Hoyt and 24th Avenues, including a bandstand. There would also be a 450-by-300-foot (137 by 91 m) athletic oval that could be turned into an ice skating pond during winter, and funding was also allocated for plantings. The bandstand had been completed by 1924. Construction of a seawall and an approximately 3,000-foot-long (910 m) section of Shore Boulevard started in April 1926, and a memorial to victims of World War I was dedicated that November. Shore Boulevard was completed and opened in October 1927. At the time, the park covered 56 acres, which were largely lawns and recreation areas. The facilities included a playground, skating rink, athletic field, restroom, six tennis courts, and two baseball diamonds. Contracts for a wading pool and six extra tennis courts were awarded in early 1929, with the tennis courts being completed later that year. Work on the Triborough Bridge above the park's southern section began in late 1929, causing significant changes to the park layout during much of the next decade.

=== Works Progress Administration renovations ===
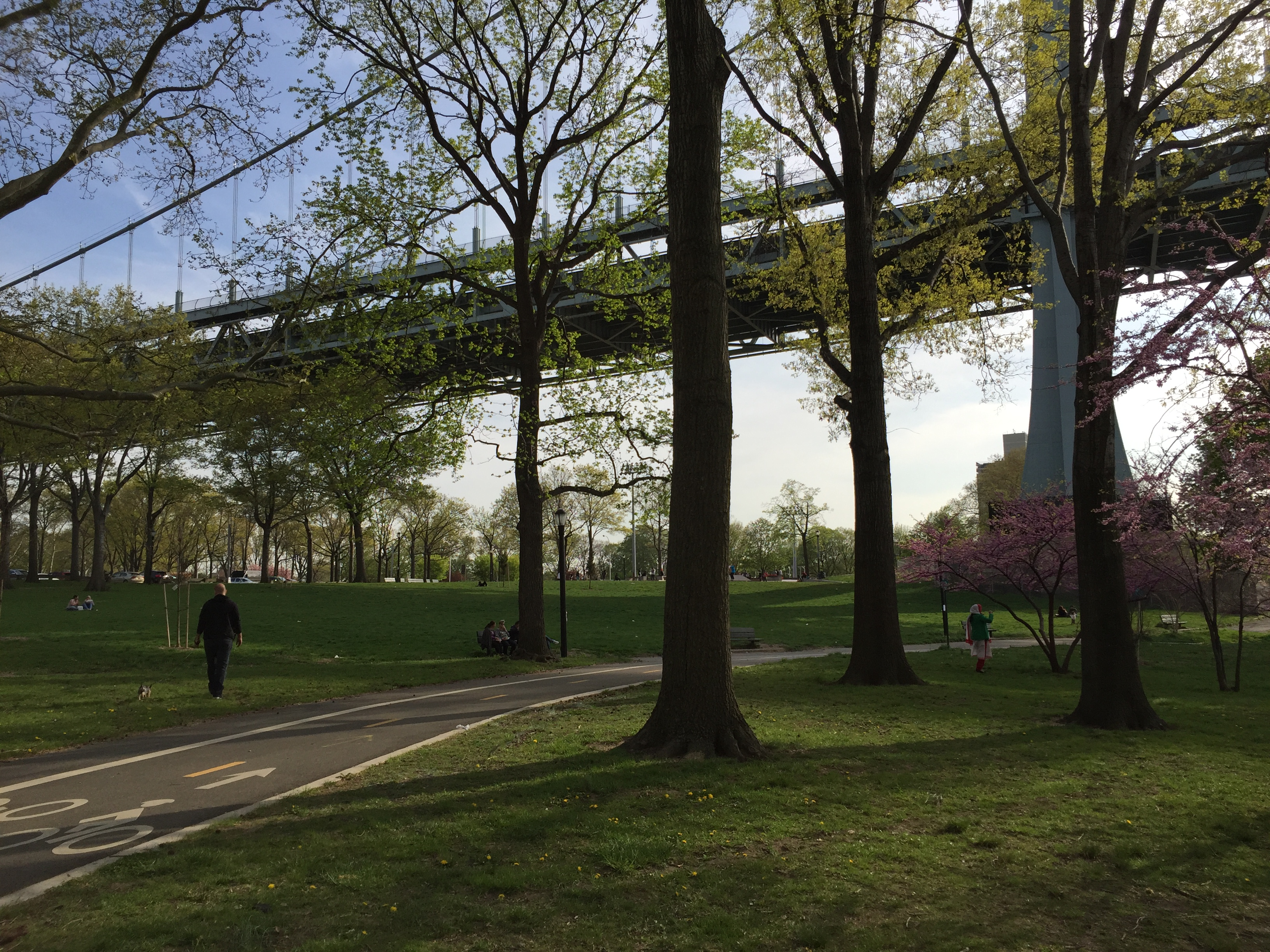
Bike path north of the Triborough Bridge

In 1934, mayor Fiorello H. La Guardia nominated Robert Moses to become commissioner of a unified New York City Department of Parks and Recreation. At the time, the United States was experiencing the Great Depression; immediately after La Guardia won the 1933 election, Moses began to write "a plan for putting 80,000 men to work on 1,700 relief projects". By the time he was in office, several hundred such projects were underway across the city.

Moses was especially interested in creating new pools and other bathing facilities, such as those in Jacob Riis Park, Jones Beach, and Orchard Beach. He devised a list of 23 pools around the city, including one at Astoria Park. The pools would be built using funds from the Works Progress Administration (WPA), a federal agency created as part of the New Deal to combat the Depression's negative effects. Eleven of these pools were to be designed concurrently and open in 1936. Moses, along with the architects Aymar Embury II and Gilmore David Clarke, created a common design for these proposed aquatic centers. Each location was to have distinct pools for diving, swimming, and wading; bleachers and viewing areas; and bathhouses with locker rooms that could be used as gymnasiums. The pools were to have several common features, such as a minimum 55-yard (50 m) length, underwater lighting, heating, and filtration, all constructed using inexpensive materials. To fit the requirement for efficiency and low-cost construction, each building would be built using elements of the Streamline Moderne and Classical architectural styles. The buildings would also be near "comfort stations", additional playgrounds, and spruced-up landscapes.

Construction for some of the 11 pools began in October 1934. The excavation plan for a large pool complex at Astoria Park was issued that December, to replace the existing wading pool. Moses was also planning a "model playground" at Astoria Park, one of five around the city. The complex was initially supposed to be completed by mid-1935, but this was delayed due to a temporary work stoppage. Plans for the bathhouse, landscape, bleachers, and filter house were completed by the end of 1935. John Hatton was responsible for the pool complex's primary design, while Gregory Kiely designed some minor details. The war memorial was moved to make way for the pool. By mid-1936, ten of the eleven WPA-funded pools were completed and were being opened at a rate of one per week. The Astoria Pool was the third pool to open; (Note: The pools opened in the following chronological order: Hamilton Fish Park, Thomas Jefferson Park, Astoria Park, Tompkinsville Pool, Highbridge Park, Sunset Park, Crotona Park, McCarren Park, Betsy Head Park, Colonial Park, and Red Hook Park.) at a ceremony on July 2, 1936, WPA administrator Harry Hopkins called the pool "the finest in the world". The Triborough Bridge opened one week afterward on July 11, adding 4.5 acres (1.8 ha) to the park's site. A 384-space parking lot opened under the bridge in July 1937, alleviating congestion at the pool.

=== Mid- and late 20th century ===
The Astoria Pool's main and diving pool hosted the 1936 Olympic swimming trials shortly after its opening. The trials, which were featured prominently in the local media, led the pool to be nicknamed the "Olympic Tryout Pool". The pool was also nicknamed "The Bathtub" for its size, and in subsequent years, children from Manhattan's Lower East Side traveled to the pool for a day "in the country". In 1940, a running track opened within Astoria Park. Siebern's athletic sculptures at the bathhouse had been removed by 1943, when Moses wrote that they "have long since traveled [...] from the storage yard to the scrap heap". The playgrounds were renovated in 1946. Within the subsequent decade, a concession stand was added to the filter house next to the pool. The 1952 Olympic swimming trials were also hosted at the Astoria Pool. The Astoria Pool hosted the Olympic swimming trials once again in 1964. In advance of this, the Astoria Play Center was renovated; its roof decks and some windows were replaced, and the facade was repainted.

By the 1970s, parks across New York City were in poor condition following the 1975 New York City fiscal crisis. The park had become dilapidated: in 1980, The New York Times reported that almost every bench had been destroyed, and teenagers were sneaking into the pool after hours. Astoria Park's conditions prompted a neighborhood resident to form Friends of Astoria Park in 1975. The group had raised $3,700 for the park's cleanup within three years.

Between 1979 and 1982, a playground and a restroom on the pool's southwest side were destroyed and ball courts were built at that location. This was part of a $5 million renovation that also included a repaved parking lot, as well as improvements to the baseball and soccer fields, running tracks, tennis courts, paths, and lighting. Much of Astoria Park was rebuilt from 1983 to 1987, including the northern playground's restroom and the seawall. The playground itself was rebuilt and reopened in 1989. By that year, the main pool was the only one of Astoria Park's three WPA-era pools in use, and it had become deteriorated, but it too was planned to be renovated for $15.3 million. Some infrastructure around the pools was replaced and upgraded in 1991, and again between 1998 and 1999. Additionally, high lead levels in the area under the Triborough Bridge, caused by paint chips falling from the bridge, forced the temporary closure of that park section in 1993.

=== 21st century ===
The northern playground and its restroom were reconstructed in the late 1990s, with $400,000 allocated to the playground and $381,000 to the restroom. The northern playground was renamed Charybdis Playground in 1997. A 400-meter (1,300 ft), eight-lane rubberized track replaced an old six-lane cinder track, and an exercise parcourse with eight stations was installed during a $2.2 million project in 2000. Another $1 million was allocated to improvements to paths and park furniture, such as fences and benches. Some restoration was undertaken on the landscape during the early 2000s. In 2006, the New York City Landmarks Preservation Commission designated the Astoria Pool and Play Center as a landmark. The commission had previously considered the pool for landmark status in 1990, along with the other ten WPA pools in the city. The landmark designation covered the pool and bathhouse, as well as part of the surrounding park between the Triborough and Hell Gate Bridges. A group of volunteers formed the Astoria Park Alliance in 2007 to clean up the park.

NYC Parks created a master plan for the Astoria Pool in 2010, in which it proposed turning the pool into a year-round facility by converting it into an ice rink or amphitheater during the off-season. The department also considered reopening the diving pool. The Astoria Skate Park opened that October, and the United States Tennis Association renovated the park's tennis courts the next year. NYC Parks announced in 2012 that it would infill the diving pool, restore the diving board, and create a plaza with an amphitheater on its site. The design process was completed in early 2015. The amphitheater's designers had found that the pool and Charybdis Playground had been dumping sewage directly into the East River ever since the pool had been constructed in the 1930s. Because the repairs required the installation of new sewer lines, the playground's restrooms were closed in 2015 for at least five years. After the design process was completed, community members advocated for the diving pool's restoration, though NYC Parks refused to change the plans. Diving Pool Plaza was completed in late 2019.

In 2016, $30 million was allocated for further improvements to the park's recreational facilities as part of the city's Anchor Parks program. A three-phase renovation of Astoria Park commenced in 2018 as part of the Anchor Parks program. The first phase, which involved rebuilding the track and other facilities in the southern portion of the park for $13.65 million, was completed in October 2019. The second phase, which includes rebuilding the wading pool and Charybdis Playground for $12.5 million, was completed in September 2021, following a temporary opening and re-closure that July. The third phase includes landscaping in the park's northern section for $4–5 million. NYC Parks also closed Astoria Pool during 2023 for a $19 million renovation. The renovation involved replacing the deck, filtration system, and mechanical systems; the pool reopened in June 2024.

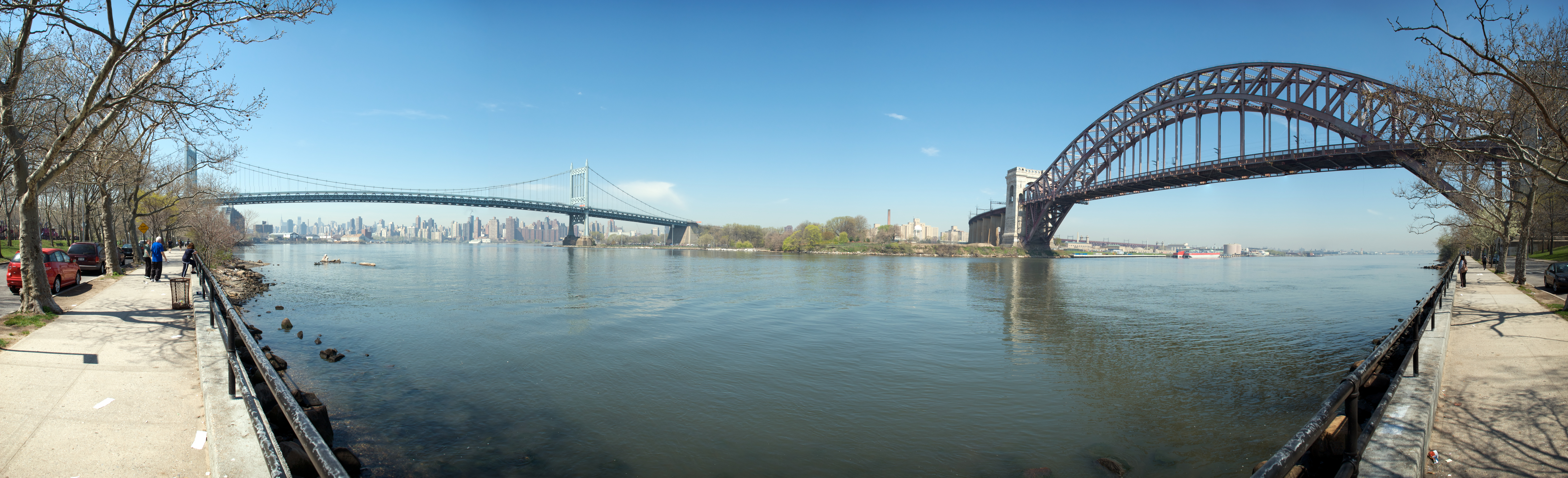
A panorama of the Triborough (left) and Hell Gate (right) Bridges from Astoria Park

== See also ==
- Art Deco architecture of New York City
- List of New York City Designated Landmarks in Queens
