= The Sibley Guide to Bird Life & Behavior =

Book by David Allen Sibley

- First Edition
- Author: David Allen Sibley
- Illustrator: David Allen Sibley
- Language: English
- Genre: Field guide
- Publisher: Alfred A. Knopf
- Publication date: 2009
- Publication place: United States
- Media type: Print (Paperback)
- Pages: 608
- ISBN: 978-1400043866

The Sibley Guide to Bird Life & Behavior is a book by David Allen Sibley that shows readers "how birds live and what they do". It is different from most field-identification guides that birdwatchers carry around; rather than help identify birds, it helps watchers gain a deeper understanding of the birds they have already identified. Instead of concentrating on individual species, the book summarizes information for families of birds, presenting "broad patterns" to help readers interpret what they see. The guide includes nearly 800 of Sibley's paintings.
