= Reeves-Reed Arboretum =

Arboretum and garden in Summit, New Jersey, United States

- The Clearing
- U.S. National Register of Historic Places
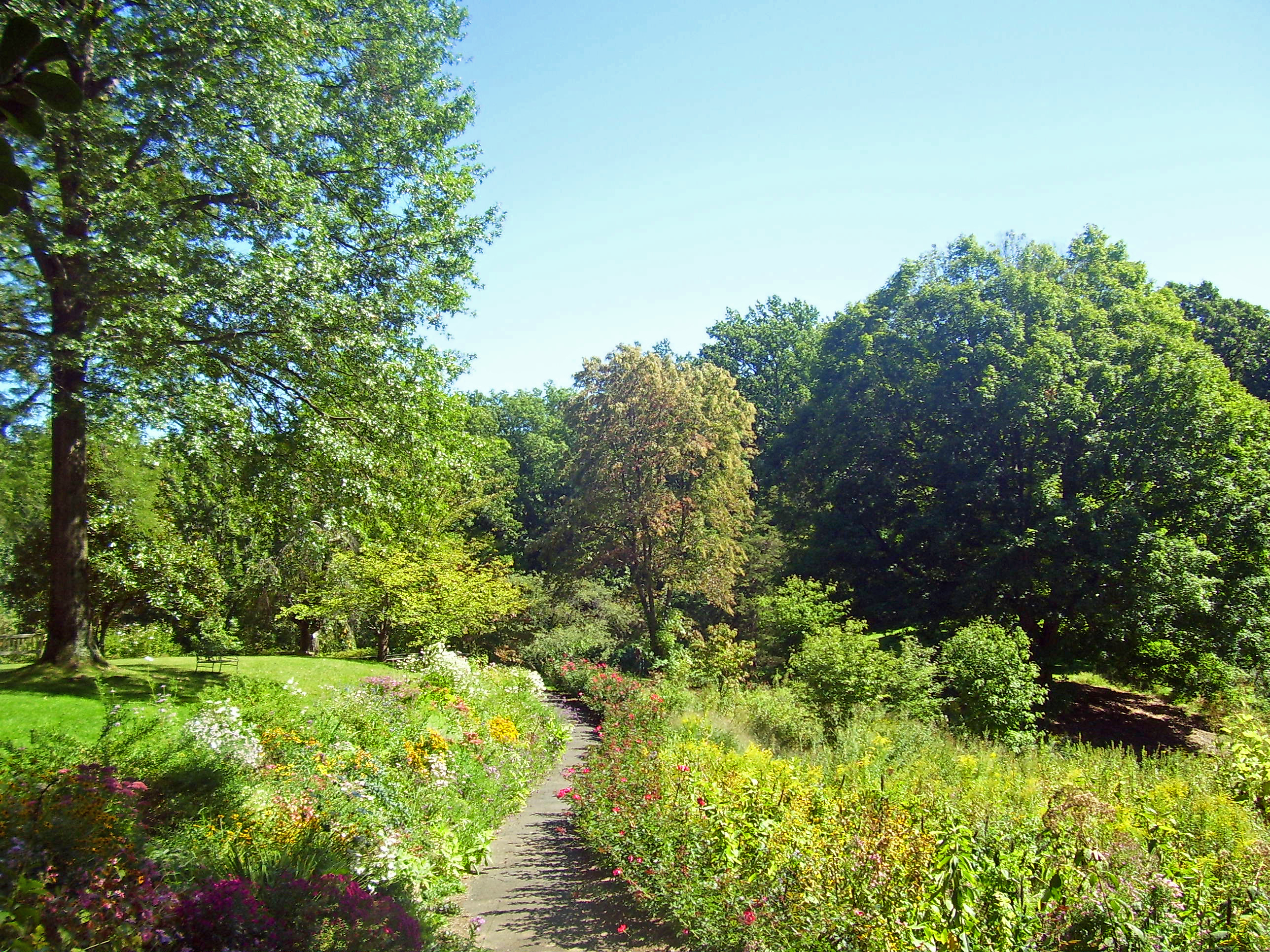
- Garden view, 2007

- Location within Union County, New Jersey Location within New Jersey Location within the United States
- Location: Summit, NJ
- Coordinates: 40°43′36″N 74°20′53″W
- Area: 13.5 acres (5.5 ha)
- Built: 1889-1925
- Architect: Calvert Vaux, Ellen Biddle Shipman and Carl F. Pilat
- Website: Official website
- NRHP reference No.: 93000233
- Added to NRHP: 1993

The Reeves-Reed Arboretum (13.5 acres (5.5 ha)) is a nonprofit arboretum and garden located at 165 Hobart Avenue in Summit, New Jersey, United States. It is the only arboretum in Union County. A popular wedding spot, the arboretum grounds are open daily from dawn till dusk, free of charge.

It was originally part of a country estate, with landscaping designed in 1889 by Calvert Vaux, known as The Clearing. In 1993 it was listed on the National Register of Historic Places under that name.

== History & landscape architecture ==
The property was originally traversed by Lenni Lenape Native Americans on their route from the coast near Elizabeth to the highlands near Schooley's Mountain. During the American Revolutionary War, it was farmed, and was adjacent to the site of the Old Sow cannon and the signal beacon atop Beacon Hill on the Second Watchung Mountain.

In 1889, John Hornor Wisner, a merchant in the China trade, purchased the property for a country estate—some 12 acres from the Swain farm. John and Isabelle Wisner, whose three children had been born in China, hired New York architects Babb, Cook and Willard to build a Colonial Revival house, sited facing south with extensive views over the rolling hills. The Wisners moved to their stylish new home and called it "The Clearing." Working with noted landscape architect Calvert Vaux, they planted specimen trees and created flower beds and a meandering path around the property. In 1916, new owners, Richard and Susie Reeves, purchased the estate. Susie Reeves expanded the gardens, guided by prominent landscape architects Ellen Biddle Shipman (1924) and Carl F. Pilat (1924-1925), adding a rose garden in 1925. The Charles L. Reed family became the last private owners in 1968, adding an herb garden. In 1974, the estate was preserved as a public arboretum by the City of Summit.

== Specialty gardens ==
The gardens are a beautifully maintained example of early 20th century landscape architecture, also known as the Country Place Era. Italianate in character, the garden layout is symmetrical and axial, creating formal garden rooms off a main axis from the house.

The Gretchen Keller Azalea Garden (designed by Shipman and Pilat) and Rock Garden contain about 850 shrubs and 25 trees. Its peak bloom is in May, with the dogwoods, azaleas, lilacs, deutzia and crabapples.

The Susie Graham Reeves Rose Garden contains 286 rose bushes, representing over 150 varieties of roses, including floribundas and hybrid teas laid out in a traditional circle-in-a-square design. The central feature of the rose garden is a cherub fountain from the Reeves period. Old fashioned roses flank the formal garden, and climbing roses are trained on posts and chains.

Features: Wesson Nature Grove, Lilac Garden, Herb Garden, Vernal Pool, Woodland Trails (hiking paths), and tours.

== Programs & events ==
Daffodil Day Over 30,000 daffodils bloom in a glacial bowl in front of Wisner House each April. The Arboretum hosts its annual Daffodil Day event to celebrate. The original flowers were planted by Susie Graham Reeves in the 1920s. Since 2014, the Arboretum has used a small herd of Nubian goats to remove excess vegetation and weeds.

Celebrate Fall Annually, the Arboretum hosts a celebration of autumn with events such as cidering, seasonal cooking demonstrations and pumpkin carving.

Other events at the garden have included a Maple Sugar Fest, Great American Backyard Campout, Holiday House Tour, and Sounds of a Summer Night.

Features: Wesson Nature Grove, Lilac Garden, Herb Garden, Vernal Pool, Woodland Trails (hiking paths), and tours.

Square Foot Gardening A pilot program started in 2018 is designed to provide children with a connection to nature through organic vegetable gardening.

Educational Programs Children in school groups visit the Arboretum for field trips on science topics, and scout groups earn badges from special programs. In summer, kids attend a wide variety of weekly nature-themed camps, organized by age. Adults visit for sessions such as Gardening 101 and Backyard Bird Feeding tips, as well as related special collaborations with arts organizations.

== See also ==
- List of botanical gardens in the United States
