= Ignatz Anton Pilát =

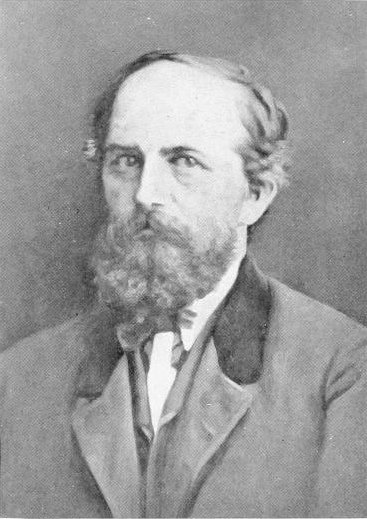
- Born: June 27, 1820
- Died: September 17, 1870 (aged 50)
- Occupations: Landscape architect, gardener
- Known for: Contributing to the original flora design of Central Park, and his redesign of Washington Square Park

Ignatz Anton Pilát (June 27, 1820 – September 17, 1870) was an Austrian-born gardener who migrated to the United States to work on the design and planting of New York City's Central Park.

Pilát was born on June 27, 1820, in St. Agatha, Upper Austria. After studying botany at the University of Vienna, he obtained a position at the Imperial Botanical Gardens of the Schönbrunn Palace in Vienna, where he acquired technical skills and participated in a botanical survey of the site. Later he was a gardener in Venice, which he fled during the political troubles of 1848.

Pilát submitted an unofficial entry to the competition for design of Central Park. This gained him the attention of Frederick Law Olmsted, who called him to New York as foreman of the gardeners. In 1863, this industrious and modest man rose to be Chief Gardener and Superintendent of the park, a position he retained for the rest of his life.

Although the overall plans of Central Park were prepared by the architects, Olmsted and Calvert Vaux, credit has been given to Ignatz Pilát for the choice of plants, their distribution, and the detailed landscaping of the park. The much admired landscaped vistas owed their design to his knowledge and use of a wide variety of plants. Pilát’s characteristic style is found in many areas of the park.

About 1870 Pilát, redesigned Washington Square Park in New York, which at that time was laid out as a military parade ground. Influenced by Frederick Law Olmsted, Pilát introduced more curvilinear paths to soften the military-straight lines of the old parade ground.

Pilát is the uncle of Carl Francis Pilat, (1876-1933), who was a landscape architect for New York City parks.

Pilát died of consumption at his home in New York on September 17, 1870, leaving "a wife and several children very poorly provided for".
