= Mount Morris Park Historic District =

Historic district in Manhattan, New York

- U.S. National Register of Historic Places
- U.S. Historic district
- New York State Register of Historic Places
- New York City Landmark
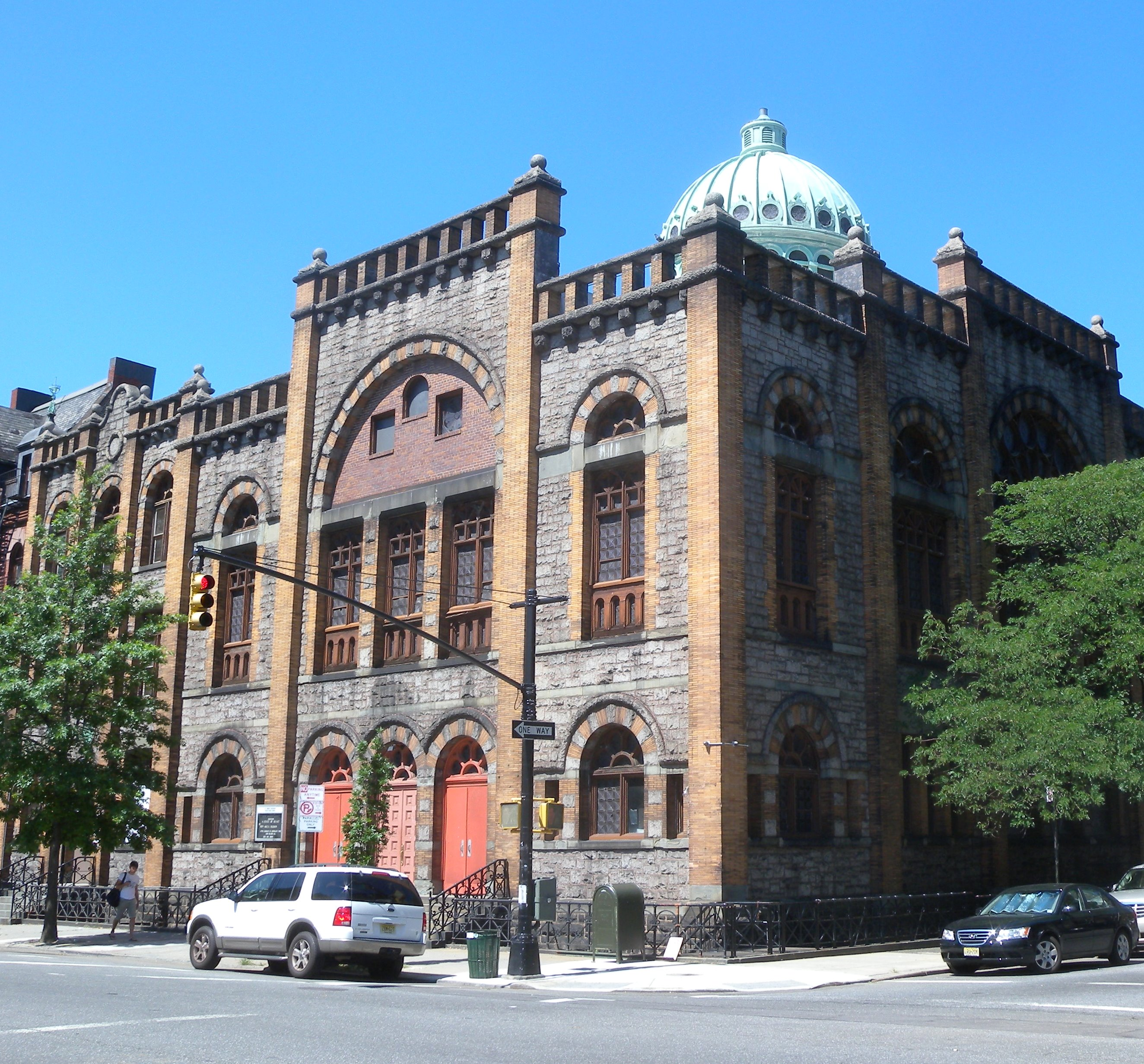
- Mt Morris Ascension Presbyterian Church

- Location within Manhattan Location within New York City
- Location: Bounded roughly by Lenox Ave., Mount Morris Park West, and W. 124th and W. 119th Sts., (original); Roughly bounded by Adam Clayton Powell Jr. Blvd. and Mt. Morris Park W. from W. 118th to W. 124th Sts., (increase), New York, New York
- Coordinates: 40°48′17″N 73°56′49″W
- Built: 1878
- Architects: Multiple; including in the increase: Angell, Edward L.; Baxter, Charles
- Architectural style: Queen Anne, Late 19th- and 20th-century Revivals, Romanesque (original); Beaux Arts, Second Empire, Renaissance (increase)
- NRHP reference No.: 73001221
- NYCL No.: 0452, 2571

Significant dates
- Added to NRHP: February 6, 1973 (original); May 24, 1996 (increase)
- Designated NYSRHP: June 23, 1980
- Designated NYCL: November 3, 1971 (original); September 22, 2015 (increase)

Mount Morris Park Historic District is a 16-block historic district in west central Harlem, Manhattan, New York City. It was designated by the New York City Landmarks Preservation Commission in 1971, and is part of the larger Mount Morris Park neighborhood. The boundaries are West 118th and West 124th Streets, Fifth Avenue, and Adam Clayton Powell Jr. Boulevard (Seventh Avenue).

"Doctor's Row" comprises the nearby stretch of West 122nd Street, Mount Morris Park West and Malcolm X Boulevard; one of the doctors of "Doctor's Row" was the father of the composer Richard Rodgers. Mount Morris Square, the core of the district, is now called Marcus Garvey Park.

== Early history ==
Before the European settlements, the rocky hill of Manhattan mica-schist was used by the Native Americans as a lookout station to see over the entire island. During the American Revolutionary War, Hessian soldiers "mounted a battery" at the hill "to command the mouth of the Harlem River".

Despite the 18th-century local prominence of the Gouverneur Morris family, the name "Mount Morris" for the rocky formation, one of two the Dutch called the Ronde Gerbergte is of 19th-century origin. Little Hill was leveled when the right-of-way was graded for the New York and Harlem Railroad, following the present route of Park Avenue.

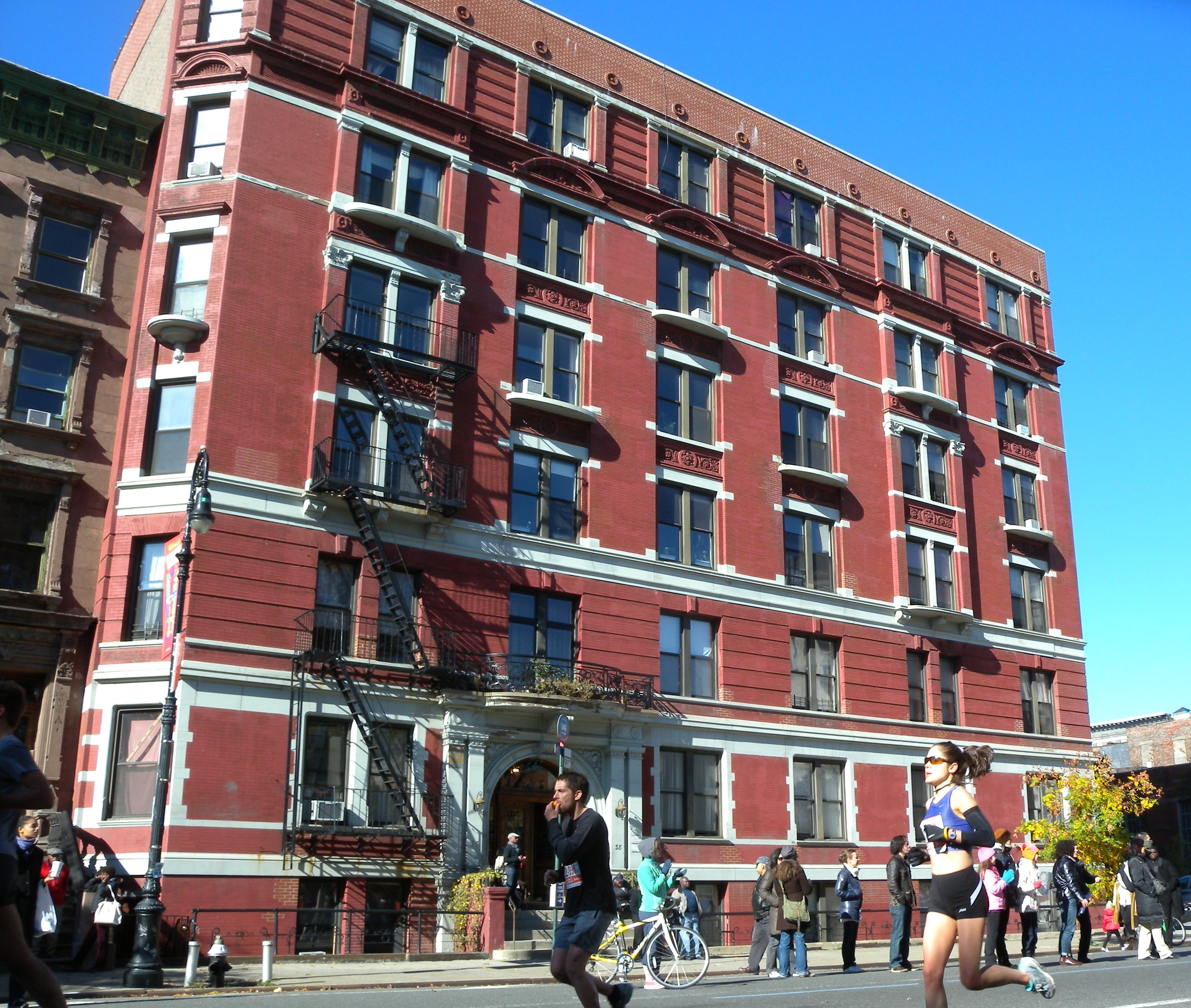
Apartment house on Mt Morris Park West

On September 4, 1839, a 20-acre (81,000 m^{2}) residential square was set aside. The square was relocated from the Commissioners' Plan of 1811, which had planned for a square in the neighborhood, in order to take advantage of the rugged topography that stood squarely in the path of Fifth Avenue. "Mount Morris Square" was officially opened December 1, 1840, but was originally unimproved until 1869, when it was landscaped to a plan by the City surveyor Ignaz Pilat.

Late 19th- and early 20th-century residential row houses and church architecture fill Mount Morris Park Historic District. There are several unaltered streetscapes. Romanesque Revival, neo-Grec, Queen Anne, and 1893's World Columbian Exposition in Chicago were among the influences that created the eclectic style from the Gilded Age.

== Community ==
In the 1930s, New York City Parks Commissionmer Robert Moses installed playgrounds and a pool. The Boys Choir of Harlem was established in the neighborhood in 1968.

In 1973, the name of the land was changed to Marcus Garvey Park. This was in honor of the international Pan-African movement leader. In 1973, a part of the current district was listed on the National Register of Historic Places.

In 1981, the Mount Morris Park Community Association (MMPCIA) was created. The organization promotes the preservation of buildings such as Apollo Theatre, National Black Theatre. It has also supported the Schomburg Center for Research in Black Culture and the Studio Museum in Harlem. The MMPCIA sponsored annual Historic Neighborhood House Tours, held on the second week of June.

The association features historic brownstones and landmark buildings open for the public to view. In 1996, the boundaries of Mount Morris Park District were expanded. They were pushed west to include blocks between Lenox Avenue and Seventh Avenue, and south to include some of West 118th Street. An extension is contemplated to reflect the area on National Register of Historic Places.
