= Cape May Bird Observatory =

Research center in New Jersey, US

Coordinates: 38.9407°N 74.9619°W

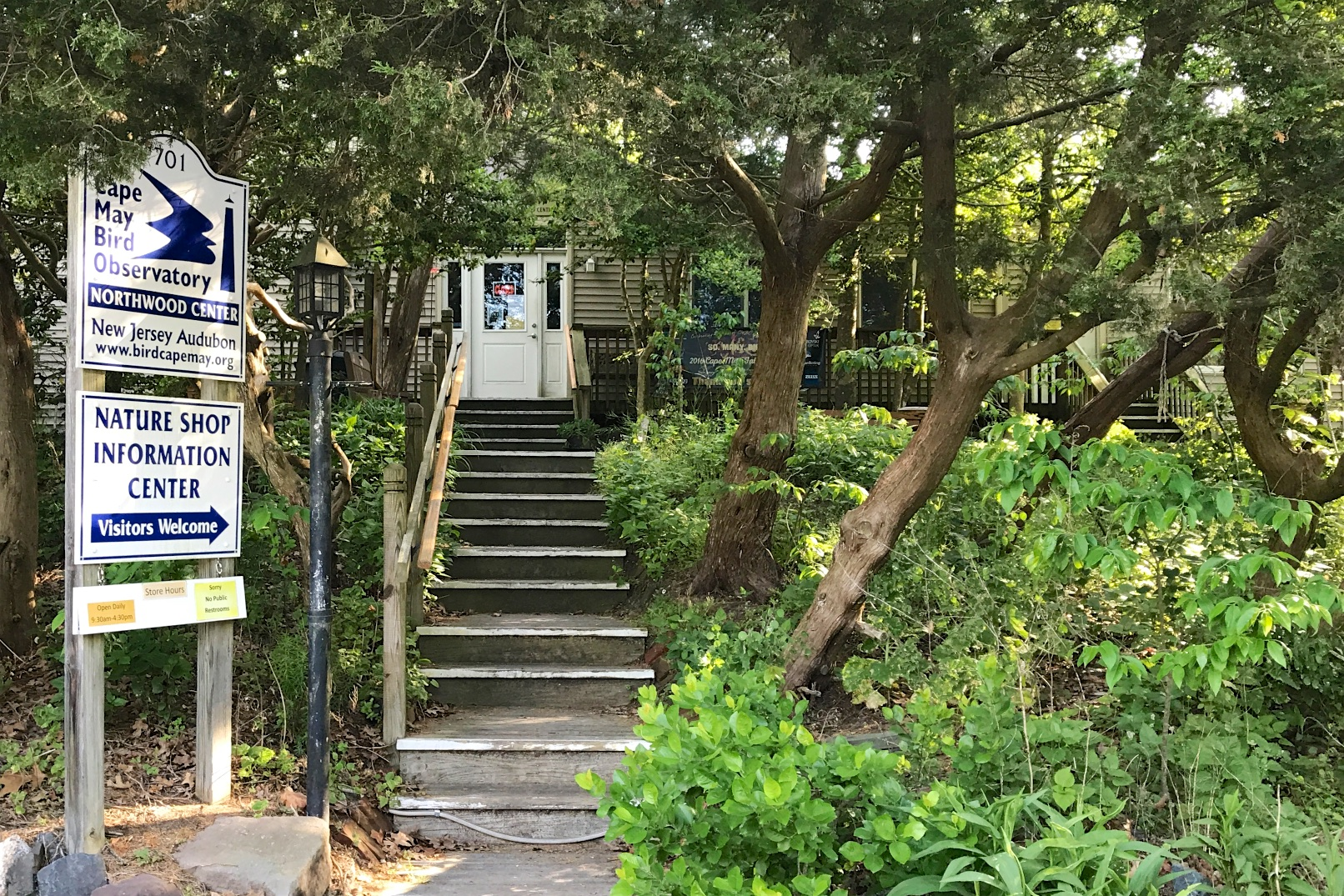
Northwood Center in Cape May Point of the Cape May Bird Observatory

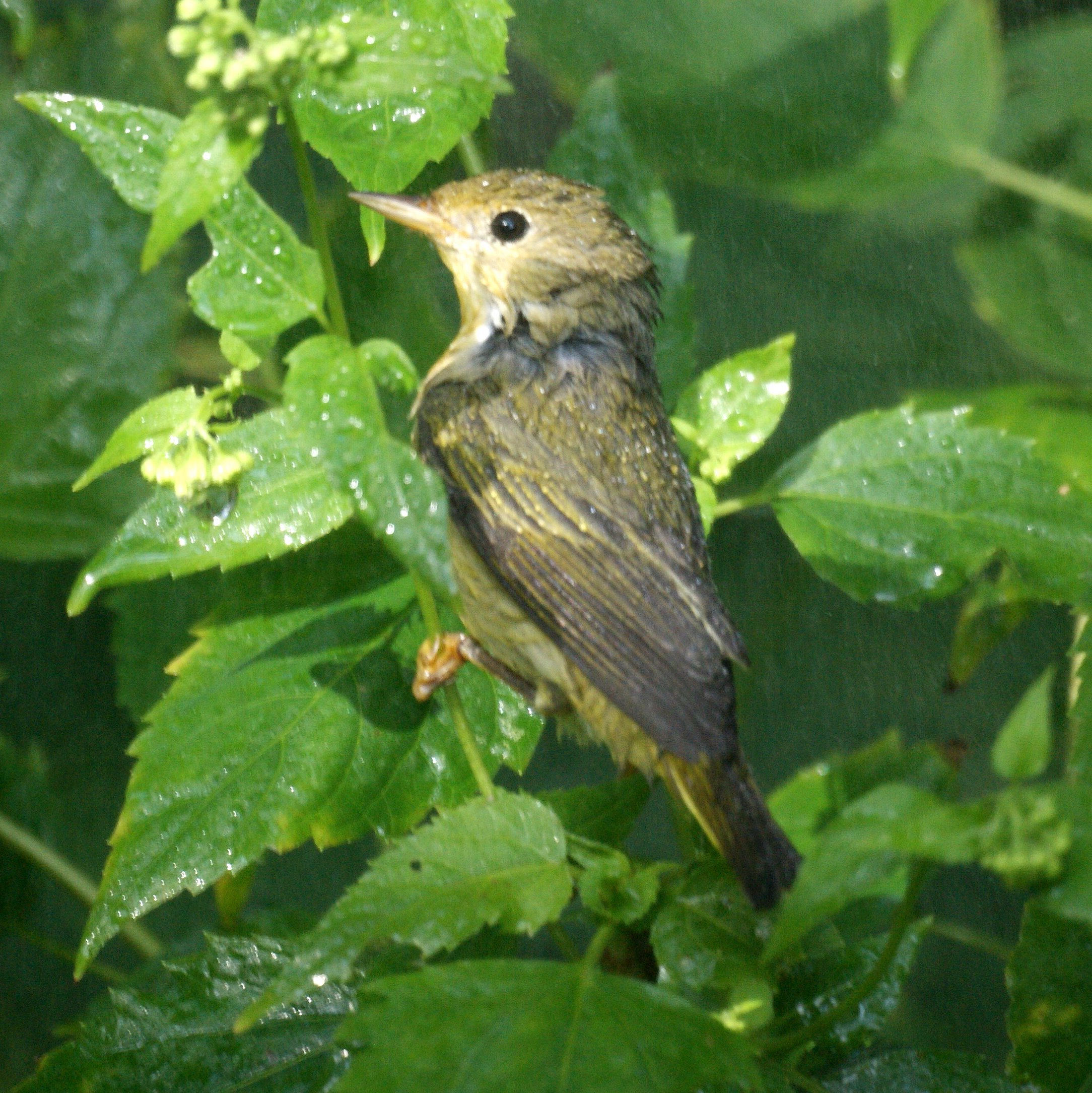
Northern yellow warbler (Setophaga aestiva) at Cape May Bird Observatory

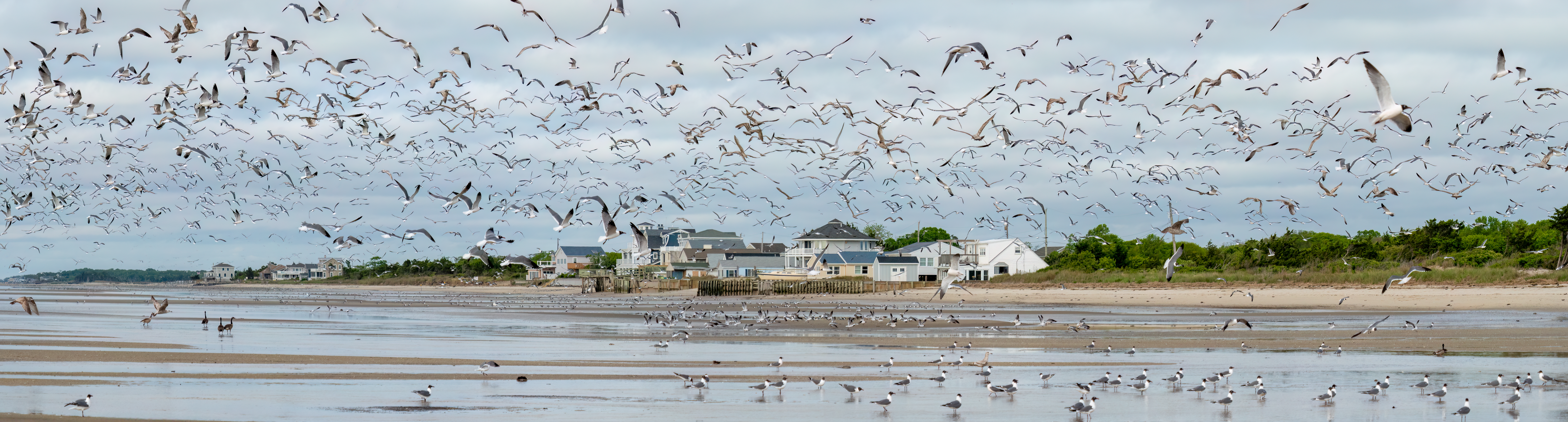
Large flock of gulls at Cape May

The Cape May Bird Observatory was founded in 1975 in Cape May, New Jersey, United States, and is sponsored by the New Jersey Audubon Society. The purpose of the Cape May Bird Observatory is to conduct research, encourage conservation, and organize educational and recreational birding activities. It consists of two separate centers: the Center for Research and Education near Cape May Court House in the central part of Cape May County, and the Northwood Center in Cape May Point.

== Bird migration ==
Cape May is at a crossroads for bird migration. Every spring and fall, thousands of migrating birds pass through the area. Subsequently, birders from all over the world have flocked to Cape May to witness the migrations.

== Ecotourism ==
Former Cape May Bird Observatory Director Paul Kerlinger published landmark studies on ecotourism in the 1990s, showing the impact of ecotourism dollars on Cape May and several other tourist areas with wildlife refuges. The United States Fish and Wildlife Service honored his work with a special citation by then director Molly Beattie.

The Cape May Bird Observatory, as part of the New Jersey Audubon Society, also helps to organize the World Series of Birding each May. The World Series, as well as other birding festivals, such as the Cape May Fall Weekend, bring hundreds of people to the Cape May area, who enjoy its rich avifauna and support the local economy.

== Authors ==
The Cape May area is home to many birding authors, including Dunne, Kerlinger, Pat and Clay Sutton, Michael O'Brien, Richard Crossley and Kevin Karlson.

Author David Allen Sibley was also a Cape May birder. Sibley wrote his classic field guide, The Sibley Guide to Birds, while he was living and birding in Cape May Point.
