= The Sibley Guide to Birds =

Ornithological book by David Allen Sibley

- First edition cover
- Author: David Allen Sibley
- Illustrator: David Allen Sibley
- Language: English
- Genre: Field guide
- Published: 2000 (Alfred A. Knopf)
- Publication place: United States
- Media type: Print (Paperback)
- Pages: 544
- ISBN: 0-679-45122-6

The Sibley Guide to Birds is a reference work and field guide for the birds found in the continental United States and Canada. It is written and illustrated by ornithologist David Allen Sibley. The book provides details on 810 species of birds, with information about identification, life history, vocalizations, and geographic distribution. It contains several paintings of each species, and is critically acclaimed for including images of each bird in flight. Two regional field guides using the same material as The Sibley Guide to Birds were released in 2003, one for the western half of North American and one for the eastern half. A second, updated edition of The Sibley Guide to Birds was released in 2014.

The guide was favorably reviewed by The New York Times, The Wilson Bulletin (now The Wilson Journal of Ornithology), and the journal Western Birds.
