= New Jersey Audubon Society =

US non-profit organization

New Jersey Audubon
- Formation: 1897; 129 years ago
- Type: Nonprofit
- Tax ID no.: 22-1539642
- Legal status: 501(c)(3)
- Headquarters: 11 Hardscrabble Road; Bernardsville, New Jersey
- Coordinates: 40.743855°N 74.552368°W
- Region served: New Jersey
- Board Chair: Richard Kauffeld
- President and CEO: Alex Ireland, Ph.D.
- Board of directors: Richard Kauffeld; Merideth S. Mueller, DMin; David H. Hall, PhD; Dana Pogorzelski; Kathy Horn; Joseph L. Basralian, Esq.; Jason Bigler; Dorothy Clair; Cinnamon Dornsife; Gordon L. Keen, Jr.; Ann Lawrence; Nelson Martinez; Angela Ortiz; Veda Truesdale; Michael J. Van Wagner; Paula Vuksic; Elizabeth Wendy Wilkes; Philip H. Witt, PhD, ABPP
- Main organ: Board of Directors
- Website: njaudubon.org

The New Jersey Audubon is an environmental education and conservation advocacy organization. Founded in 1897, it is one of New Jersey's largest environmental organizations, with several staffed nature centers, dozens of unstaffed sanctuaries, and thousands of members throughout New Jersey and beyond. New Jersey Audubon is an independent organization and is not affiliated with the National Audubon Society.

== Activities ==
According to its website, the New Jersey Audubon Society, "fosters environmental awareness and a conservation ethic among New Jersey's citizens; protects New Jersey's birds, mammals, other animals, and plants, especially endangered and threatened species; and promotes preservation of New Jersey's valuable natural habitats."

New Jersey Audubon carries out this mission in a number of ways. Some of its recent conservation efforts have included working together with state and federal legislators to secure funding for wildlife conservation, trying to get a moratorium passed for horseshoe crab fishing in Delaware Bay in order to reverse the recent drastic decline in red knot populations, inaugurating a network of birding and wildlife trails, and working together with sportsmen and property owners to preserve grassland habitats.

In addition to its conservation efforts, New Jersey Audubon aims to educate people about New Jersey's environment. Scout groups, school groups, and children in summer day camps all have the possibility to learn more about environmental issues and wildlife native to New Jersey through programs offered at New Jersey Audubon nature centers. Meanwhile, New Jersey Audubon also offers numerous lectures, tours, and programs to help increase awareness of the natural world for adults as well. Teachers can also benefit from professional development programs sponsored by New Jersey Audubon, as well as through publications such as "Bridges to the Natural World" intended to help introduce their students to New Jersey's natural heritage.

A third major focus of New Jersey Audubon's efforts lies in sponsoring research on New Jersey's environment and wildlife. Such research includes hawk watches at Montclair, Sandy Hook, and Cape May to monitor long-term trends in raptor populations, using radar and other tools to identify crucial habitat for migrating songbirds under the "Oases Along the Flyway" program, and monitoring populations of breeding bird species in the Hackensack Meadowlands.

Finally, New Jersey Audubon also sponsors numerous field trips to various sites of environmental importance throughout New Jersey and beyond. Many of these trips are aimed primarily at birders, although trips focused on butterflies, dragonflies, reptiles and amphibians, hiking, canoeing, and caving, among other topics, are also offered on a regular basis. New Jersey Audubon also sponsors the annual World Series of Birding, perhaps the world's most famous birdwatching competition. Competing teams seek to find as many bird species as they can in the state of New Jersey, or a section thereof, on a Saturday in mid-May. The event also functions as a major fundraiser for New Jersey Audubon since competitors raise pledges for each bird species seen.

Due to its many successes in helping preserve New Jersey's environment, as well as its efficient and effective management, New Jersey Audubon Society currently enjoys a four-star rating (the highest possible) by Charity Navigator.

== Nature Centers ==
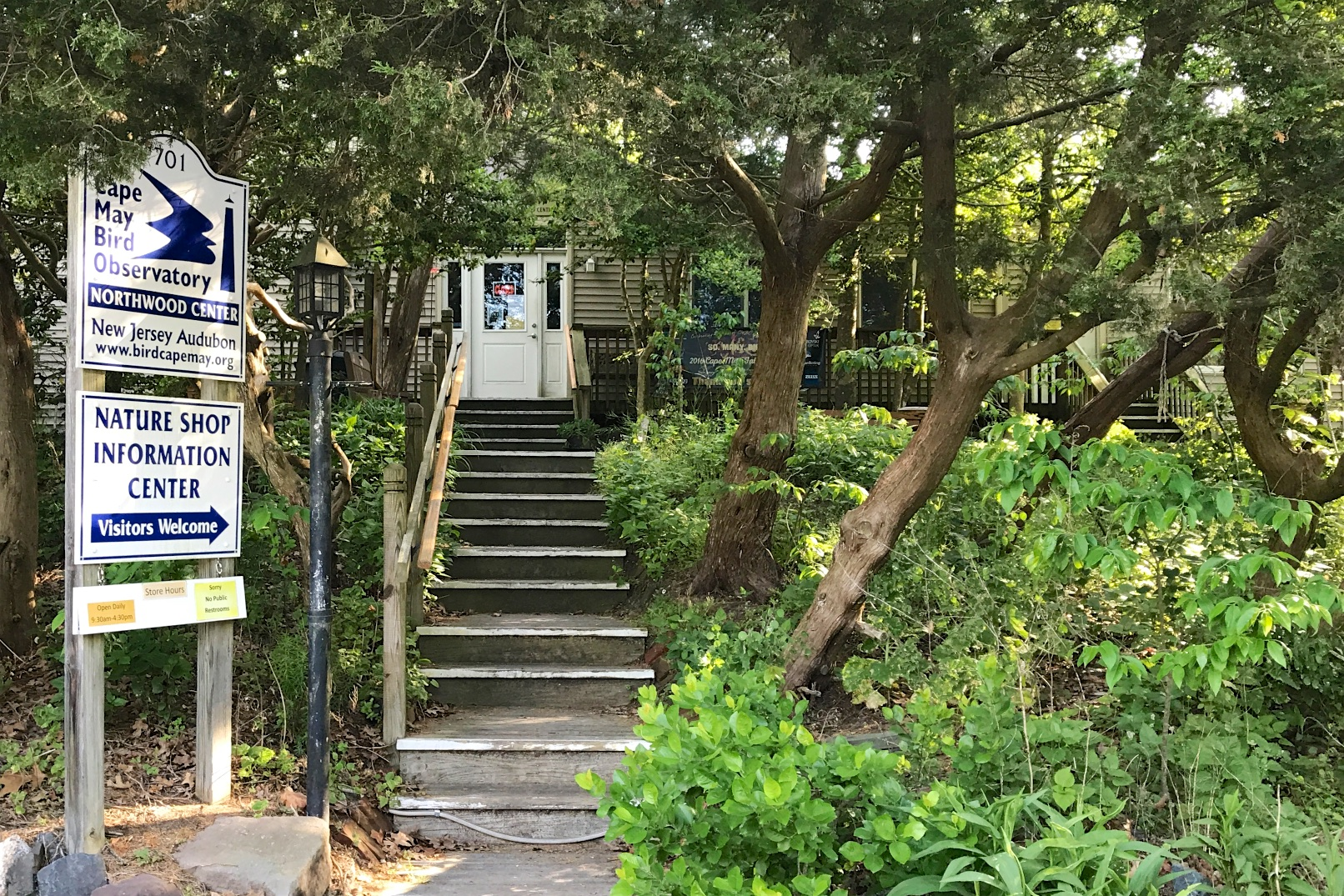
Cape May Bird Observatory: The Northwood Center

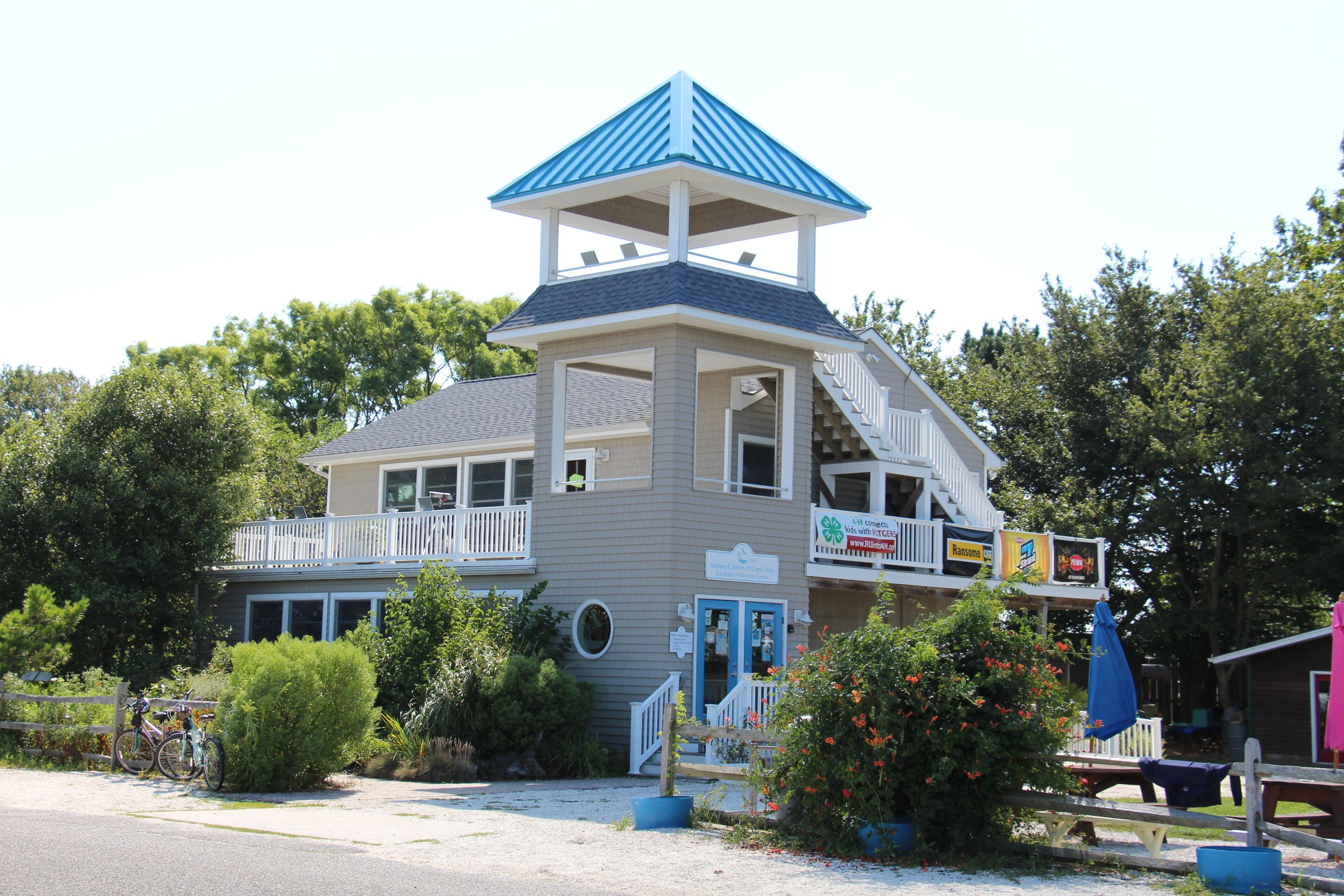
Nature Center of Cape May

The New Jersey Audubon Society operates staffed nature centers throughout New Jersey. Each of them offers an array of field trips, programs, lectures, exhibits on the natural world, a small bookstore and gift shop, and most have an attached wildlife sanctuary. The centers include:

- Cape May Bird Observatory: The Center for Research and Education, Cape May Court House, Cape May County
- Cape May Bird Observatory: The Northwood Center, Cape May Point, Cape May County
- Hawk Rise Sanctuary, Linden, Union County
- Lorrimer Sanctuary, Franklin Lakes, Bergen County
- Nature Center of Cape May, Cape May, Cape May County
- Scherman-Hoffman Wildlife Sanctuary, Bernardsville, Somerset County - headquarters
