= David Allen Sibley =

American ornithologist and artist

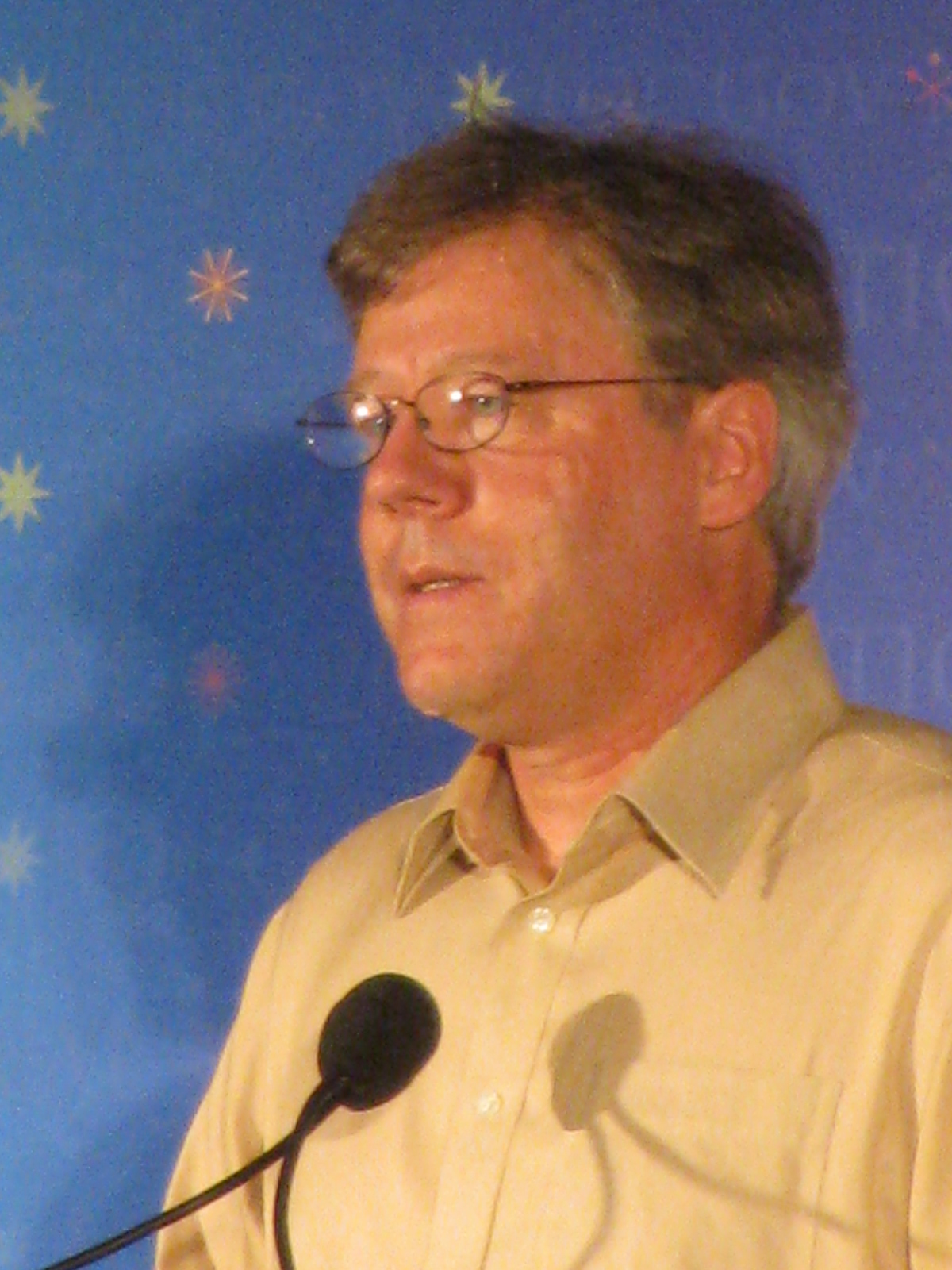
- Sibley at the 2014 National Book Festival
- Born: October 22, 1961 (age 64); Plattsburgh, New York
- Occupations: Author; Ornithologist; Illustrator
- Writing career
- Subject: Birds
- Notable work: The Sibley Guide to Birds
- Website: www.sibleyguides.com

David Allen Sibley (born October 22, 1961, in Plattsburgh, New York) is an American ornithologist. He is the author and illustrator of The Sibley Guide to Birds, which rivals Roger Tory Peterson's as the most comprehensive guides for North American ornithological field identification.

Sibley has also authored a follow-up book, The Sibley Guide to Bird Life & Behavior.

== Life and work ==
The son of Yale University ornithologist Fred Sibley, David Sibley began birding in childhood. Sibley got his start as a birdwatcher in Cape May Point, New Jersey in 1980, after dropping out of college. A largely self-taught bird illustrator, he was inspired to pursue creating his own illustrated field guide after leading tours in the 1980s and 1990s and finding that existing field guides did not generally illustrate or describe alternate or juvenile plumages of birds. He cites European wildlife artist Lars Jonsson as a great influence on his own work. In 2002, he received the Roger Tory Peterson Award from the American Birding Association for lifetime achievement in promoting the cause of birding. In 2006, he was awarded the Linnaean Society of New York's Eisenmann Medal.

Sibley is married with two sons and lives in Concord, Massachusetts.
