= Eisenmann Medal =

Award by the Linnaean Society of New York

The Eisenmann Medal is awarded by the Linnaean Society of New York (LSNY) in recognition of the recipient's ornithological excellence and encouragement of amateur efforts in ornithology and birding.

The medal commemorates the ornithologist and prominent LSNY member Eugene Eisenmann (1906–1981). It has been awarded since 1983; in some years no medal is awarded.

== Eisenmann medalists ==
Source: Linnaean Society of New York

- 1983 – Ernst Mayr
- 1984 – Joseph Hickey
- 1985 – Olin Sewall Pettingill
- 1986 – Roger Tory Peterson
- 1987 – Chandler S. Robbins
- 1988 – Frank B. Gill
- 1989 – Helen Hays
- 1990 – C. Stuart Houston
- 1991 – David B. Wingate
- 1993 – G. Stuart Keith
- 1995 – Guy Tudor
- 1998 – Dean Amadon
- 2001 – Robert S. Ridgeley
- 2002 – William S. Clark
- 2003 – F. Gary Stiles
- 2004 – David J.T. Hussell and Erica H. Dunn
- 2005 – John W. Fitzpatrick
- 2006 – David A. Sibley
- 2008 – Malcolm C. Coulter
- 2009 – Kenneth V. Rosenberg
- 2011 – Alvaro Jaramillo
- 2012 – Clive Minton
- 2013 – Kenn Kaufman
- 2014 – Sophie Webb
- 2016 – Tim Birkhead
- 2017 – Peter Harrison
- 2018 – John P. O'Neill
- 2020 – Stephen W. Kress
- 2021 – Peter and Rosemary Grant
- 2022 – Jennie Duberstein
- 2023 – Scott V. Edwards
- 2024 – George Archibald
- 2025 – Bryan D. Watts

== See also ==
- List of ornithology awards
