= Chandler Robbins =

American ornithologist and author (1918–2017)

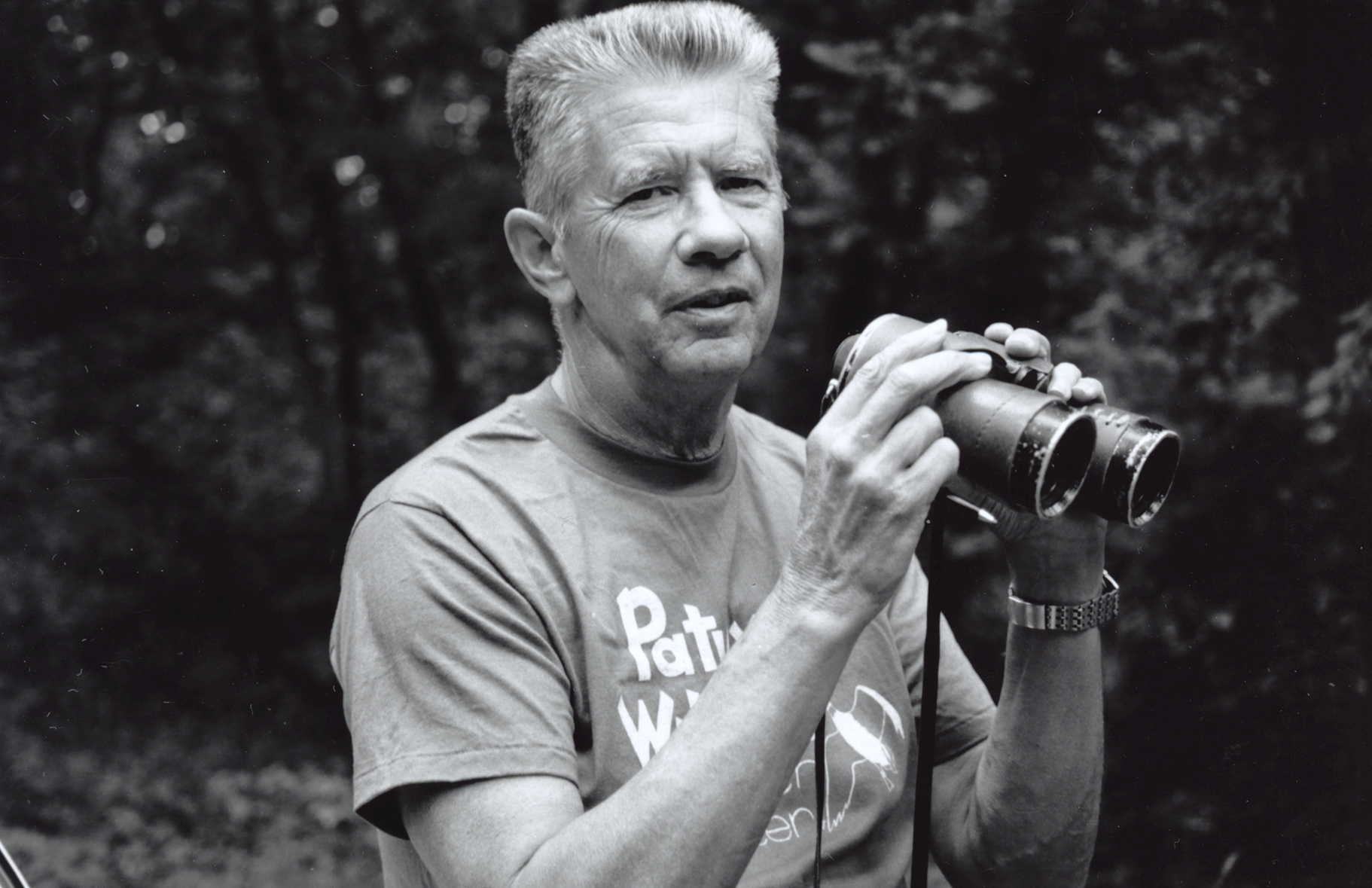
- Chandler Robbins, in the field
- Born: July 17, 1918; Belmont, Massachusetts, U.S.
- Died: March 20, 2017 (aged 98); Columbia, Maryland, U.S.
- Education: Harvard University, George Washington University
- Known for: North American Breeding Bird Survey, Birds of North America: A Guide to Field Identification
- Scientific career
- Fields: Ornithology
- Workplaces: Patuxent Wildlife Research Center

Chandler Seymour Robbins (July 17, 1918 – March 20, 2017) was an American ornithologist. His contributions to the field include co-authorship of an influential field guide to birds, as well as organizing the North American Breeding Bird Survey.

== Early life ==
Robbins was born in Belmont, Massachusetts. He received an A.B. degree from Harvard University in 1940; Ludlow Griscom was one of his advisers there. His M.A. degree is from George Washington University in 1950.

== Career ==
After Harvard, Chandler Robbins taught for a few years. As an alternative to active-duty military service during World War II, he joined the Civilian Public Service. In 1943, he transferred to what is now the Patuxent Wildlife Research Center in Maryland, at the invitation of Frederick Charles Lincoln. Robbins joined the U.S. Fish and Wildlife Service (USFWS) full-time in 1945 as a junior biologist at Patuxent. In his early career, he co-authored journal publications on the effects of the pesticide DDT on breeding bird populations; this work, and that of other researchers, led to Rachel Carson's publication of the book Silent Spring.

In his lengthy career, Robbins made major contributions in the discipline of field ornithology, from innovative measurement techniques to documentation of the effects of forest fragmentation on eastern woodland birds. His research into forest fragmentation informed regulations developed by the state of Maryland to provide environmental protection to Chesapeake Bay. In 2012, Robbins stated that his work toward preservation of large, unbroken tracts of forest was his greatest personal pride. He performed field work in the mid-Atlantic region, in Latin America and on Midway Island. Robbins banded a Laysan albatross named Wisdom on Midway Island in 1956. As of 2025, Wisdom is at least 74 years old and is the oldest verified living wild bird. A great advocate for bird banding as a tool for science and conservation, Robbins banded more than 300 species and 190,000 individual birds over the course of his career.

One of the most important accomplishments by Robbins is the methodology of the North American Breeding Bird Survey. The data collection and population estimation scheme employed the strategy of point count samples taken along the roadside by skilled observers; it thereby made the practice of continent-wide bird monitoring efficient for the first time, and placed it on a sound statistical footing. First tested in Maryland and Delaware in 1965, the BBS was rolled out nationwide in the next few years.

In the mid-1940s, Robbins became coordinator of the continent-wide collection of bird migration records in a program initiated by Wells W. Cooke. The program accepted its last cards in 1970, but these 90 years of records are now being digitized and transcribed as part of the North American Bird Phenology Program (BPP).

Robbins was selected as one of three Americans to negotiate a treaty with the Soviet Union protecting migratory birds, signed in 1976 and ratified in 1978.

From 1948 to 2013, Robbins was the editor of the Maryland Ornithological Society's Maryland Birdlife, and he was the technical editor for Audubon Field Notes/North American Birds (1952–1989). Robbins authored or coauthored more than 650 papers, books, maps, and annotated checklists.

In the popular press, Robbins wrote Birds of North America: A Guide to Field Identification with Bertel Bruun and Herbert S. Zim (illustrated by Arthur B. Singer) in 1966. The so-called "Golden Guide" (the authors' names did not appear on the front cover) introduced innovative two-page spreads that integrated text, illustrations, range maps and silhouettes. Tracking the advances in optics available to birders, the book presented a wider range of plumages, in more color and detail, than previous guidebooks. Distribution information for the guide was provided, in part, by field observations collected under the BPP. As another innovation, the guide represented bird vocalizations with sonograms, two-dimensional graphs of frequency and amplitude over time. Most of the sonograms were prepared from Robbins's own field recordings. The work and its integration of design and purpose were cited by Edward Tufte for its "sense of craft, detail, and credibility that comes from gathering and displaying good evidence all together." It was likewise a commercial success, with millions of copies sold. (A small point of confusion: the publisher issued the book in its Golden Field Guide series, using the Golden Guide name for its science books for younger readers.)

From his position as a public servant, Chandler Robbins matched the rising need for information on bird distribution and population trends with a newly developed cohort of citizen scientists. Equipped with song identification skills, a modern field guide, and the BBS's data collection protocol, these observers provided the raw data for Robbins's initiatives. His "superhuman tolerance for the bookkeeping aspects of bird counting" enabled him to transform that mass of data into knowledge, thereby forming the research backbone of North American bird conservation.

== Recognition ==
Mural "Conservation Champion/Wisdom," honoring Chandler Robbins, painted by Jeff Huntington and Julia Gibb of Jahru Studio

Chandler Robbins was named an Elective Member of the American Ornithologists' Union (now the American Ornithological Society) in 1949 and a Fellow in 1970.

In 1987, Robbins was awarded the Linnaean Society of New York's Eisenmann Medal. Also in 1987, Robbins received the U.S. Department of the Interior's Distinguished Service Award. From the USFWS, Robbins received a Meritorious Service Award. He received the Ludlow Griscom Award for contributions in regional ornithology from the American Birding Association in 1984; the Conservation Achievement Award from the National Wildlife Federation in 1995 (for the BBS); the Elliott Coues Award from the American Ornithologists' Union in 1997; the 2000 Audubon Medal from the National Audubon Society; and the 2015 Roger Tory Peterson Award for lifetime achievement in advancing the cause of birding, again from the American Birding Association. In 1995, Robbins was awarded an honorary Doctor of Science degree from the University of Maryland, College Park.

In 2000, the American Birding Association established the Chandler Robbins Award for significant contributions to birder education and/or bird conservation. The Foundation for Ecodevelopment and Conservation (FUNDAECO) of Guatemala named the Chandler Robbins Biological Station, located in its Cerro San Gil reserve, in his honor.

In 2025, Laurel, Maryland-based Laurel for the Patuxent commissioned a mural honoring Robbins. The mural is on the side of a convenience store at 500 Main Street.

== Later life and death ==
After 60 years of public service, Robbins retired from the Patuxent Wildlife Research Center in 2005, taking the title Scientist Emeritus. As of 2015, Robbins was still an active volunteer at the Bird Banding Lab "appearing at the lab in Laurel about three times a week".

Chandler Robbins, a resident of Laurel, Maryland, died on 20 March 2017 in a hospital in Columbia, Maryland of congestive heart failure and other ailments. His wife of six decades, the former Eleanor Cooley, died in 2008. He is survived by four children, Jane, Nancy, Stuart, and George; two grandchildren; and eight great-grandchildren.

== Selected publications ==
- Robbins, Chandler S.; Stewart, Robert E. (January 1949). "Effects of DDT on Bird Population of Scrub Forest". Journal of Wildlife Management. 13 (1): 11–16. doi:10.2307/3796121. JSTOR 3796121.
- Robbins, Chandler S.; Springer, Paul F.; Webster, Clark G. (April 1951). "Effects of Five-Year DDT Application on Breeding Bird Population". Journal of Wildlife Management. 15 (2): 213–216. doi:10.2307/3796613. JSTOR 3796613.
- Stewart, R. E.; Robbins, Chandler S. (1958). Birds of Maryland and the District of Columbia. North American Fauna. Vol. 62. U.S. Fish and Wildlife Service.
- Robbins, Chandler S.; Bruun, Bertel; Zim, Herbert S. (1966). Birds of North America: A Guide to Field Identification. Illustrated by Arthur Singer. New York, NY: Golden Press, Inc. ISBN 978-0-307-13656-5.
- Robbins, Chandler S.; Van Velzen, W. T. (1967). The Breeding Bird Survey, 1966. Special Scientific Report—Wildlife. Vol. 102. U.S. Fish and Wildlife Service.
- Robbins, Chandler S. (1979). "Effect of Forest Fragmentation on Bird Populations" ( (PDF)). In DeGraaf, Richard M.; Evans, Keith E. (eds.). Management of North Central and Northeastern Forests for Nongame Birds. Minneapolis, MN: North Central Forest Experiment Station, U.S. Department of Agriculture, Forest Service. pp. 198–212. Archived from the original on 3 May 2017. General Technical Report NC-51.
- Whitcomb, R. F.; Robbins, Chandler S. (1981). "Effects of forest fragmentation on avifauna of the eastern deciduous forest". In Burgess, R.L.; Sharpe, D.M. (eds.). Forest Island Dynamics in Man-Dominated Landscapes. Ecological Studies. Vol. 41. New York: Springer-Verlag. pp. 125–205. ISBN 978-0-387-90584-6.
- Robbins, Chandler S.; Dawson, D.K.; Dowell, B.A. (1989). Habitat Area Requirements of Breeding Forest Birds of the Middle Atlantic States. Wildlife Monographs. Vol. 103. The Wildlife Society. Bibcode:1989harb.book....3R. Received a 1990 Wildlife Publication Award.
- Robbins, Chandler S.; Sauer, John R.; Greenberg, Russell S.; Droege, Sam (October 1989). "Population Declines in North American Birds that Migrate to the Neotropics". Proceedings of the National Academy of Sciences. 86 (19): 7658–7662. Bibcode:1989PNAS...86.7658R. doi:10.1073/pnas.86.19.7658. PMC 298126. PMID 2798430.
- Robbins, Chandler S.; Fitzpatrick, J.W; Hamel, P.B. (1992). "A warbler in trouble: Dendroica cerulea". In Hagan, John M. III; Johnston, David W. (eds.). Ecology and Conservation of Neotropical Migrant Landbirds. Washington, DC: Smithsonian Institution Press. pp. 549–562.
- Robbins, Chandler S.; Blom, Eirik A. T. (1996). Atlas of the Breeding Birds of Maryland and the District of Columbia. Pittsburgh, PA: University of Pittsburgh Press. ISBN 978-0-8229-3923-8.
- Robbins, Chandler S. (2016). "Early Avian Studies at Patuxent". In Perry, Matthew C. (ed.). The History of Patuxent: America's Wildlife Research Story. Circular. Vol. 1422. Reston, VA: U.S. Geological Survey. pp. 13–24. doi:10.3133/cir1422.

== Notes ==
Convention Between the United States of America and the Union of Soviet Socialist Republics Concerning the Conservation of Migratory Birds and Their Environment, T.I.A.S. 9073.
