= Keith Russell (ornithologist) =

American Ornithologist and Conservationist

Keith Russell is an American ornithologist, birder, science communicator, and conservationist from Philadelphia, Pennsylvania. He is a leading advocate of bird-safe glass and other methods for reducing mortality of migrating songbirds in urban environments. He is currently the program manager for urban conservation for Pennsylvania Audubon.

Russell grew up in Mount Airy, a neighborhood in northwest Philadelphia, and graduated from Germantown Friends School in 1973. He attended Cornell University and graduated with a B.S. in biology in 1978. He earned an M.Sc. in zoology from Clemson University in 1981.

Russell worked as collections manager for the Exhibits Department at the Academy of Natural Sciences of Philadelphia from 1982 to 1992. He was the assistant editor for the landmark publication The Birds of North America (1992–2003), edited by Frank Gill.

Russell has coordinated the Philadelphia Mid-winter Bird Census for more than three decades, for which the American Birding Association awarded him the Ludlow Griscom Award for Outstanding Contributions to Regional Ornithology in 2016.

== Publications ==
- Russell, K. 1973. Breeding birds of the upper Wissahickon. Cassinia 54: 10–14.
- Russell, K. 1979. Birds of the Wissahickon Valley. Cassinia 57: 6–9.
