= Birds of the World: Recommended English Names =

Book

- Author: Frank Gill and Minturn Wright
- Language: English
- Subject: Birds
- Publisher: Christopher Helm / Princeton University Press
- Publication date: 2006
- Publication place: United States
- Media type: Print (paperback)
- Pages: ix + 259
- ISBN: 978-0-7136-7904-5
- OCLC: 69484497

Birds of the World: Recommended English Names is a paperback book written by Frank Gill and Minturn Wright on behalf of the International Ornithologists' Union. It is an attempt to produce a standardized set of English names for all bird species and is the product of a project set in motion at the 1990 International Ornithological Congress. The book is supplemented by a website, the IOC World Bird List, giving updates to the published material.

An 11-page introduction deals with a number of issues that relate to the naming of birds. This is followed by a systematic list, from pages 12 to 211, and a 46-page index. The family sequence is that of the third edition of the Howard and Moore Complete Checklist of the Birds of the World. The book's cover is illustrated with a photo of a helmet vanga, a bird endemic to Madagascar.

== Background ==
Since the pioneering work of Linnaeus, species of organisms have had recognized scientific names in Latin, Greek, or a modernized derivative of one or both of those languages. In most groups of organisms, the scientific names are sufficient, having widespread use among both academics and amateurs. By contrast, non-scientific (vernacular) names for bird species are used extensively in scientific communication, as well as in the large community of amateur enthusiasts. However, vernacular names change frequently and often vary from place to place. Consequently, there is a need to have a degree of consistency in the vernacular names used around the world.

In the late 19th century, the American Ornithologists' Union (AOU) made an attempt to standardize the English names of birds; its effort covered the United States and Canada. This work's most recent edition, the seventh, covers North America as far south as Panama, but this omits some 80% of the world's species and is still sometimes controversial. A number of authors have come up with lists of birds of the world, but none had as its primary goal the standardization of names. As a result, the field of English names of birds was left "a swirling sea of polylexy and polysemy, where one bird may have many names and one name may apply to many birds."

In the late 1980s, the International Ornithological Congress (IOC) sought to reach consensus in standardized vernacular names for commonly used languages. Standardized names were published for French in 1993 and Spanish in 1995. English names proved particularly challenging: the task took more than fifteen years. Even then, the authors acknowledged that reaching complete global consensus on names and spelling is unlikely, and they presented this work as a first phase of an ongoing process.

The English names project began in 1990, when the IOC appointed a committee of prominent ornithologists, chaired by Burt L. Monroe, Jr., to consider the issue. The work "proved to be more difficult and time-consuming" than expected. Monroe's death brought the project to a halt. Not until 1994 was the project revived, by Gill and Walter Bock. Gill invited Wright to become recording secretary and organizer of the process; the two were named co-chairs of the revitalized committee.

== Authors and committee ==
The standardization effort was undertaken by a committee of the IOC (the Standing Committee on English Names), with six regional subcommittees, who did most of the work. The Standing Committee was co-chaired by Frank Gill, a professional ornithologist with worldwide research interests and experience, and Minturn Wright, a lawyer and international birder with an interest in nomenclature; these two were the authors of the book and supervised the overall task. G. Stuart Keith, Christopher Perrins, Nigel Redman, Robert S. Ridgely, Stephen M. Russell, Peter G. Ryan, and Richard Schodde served as regional chairs. David B. Donsker was taxonomic editor.

Twenty-eight committee members worked to formulate the rules and apply them to the task: Per Alström, Mark Beaman, Aldo Berutti, Clive Barlow, David Bishop, Murray Bruce, Paul Coopmans, W. Richard J. Dean, Brian Gill, Simon Harrap, Steven Hilty, Steve N. G. Howell, Tim Inskipp, Michael Irwin, Kenn Kaufman, G. Stuart Keith, Ben King, David Parkin, Christopher Perrins, H. Douglas Pratt, Nigel Redman, Peter G. Ryan, Robert S. Ridgley, Phillip Round, Stephen M. Russell, Richard Schodde, Donald Turner, and Harrison B. Tordoff. The committee members received abundant assistance from others as well. As the authors noted, the compilation of the list was an all-volunteer effort.

== Criteria ==
As part of the name standardization, it was also necessary to develop a set of rules for spelling, capitalization, the use of derivative names, and the like. While the rules occupy several pages of the book, they may be briefly summarized:

- Official English names of species are capitalized (as was already the practice among ornithologists)
- Patronyms (names of people) are used in the possessive form, e.g., "Ross's Gull"
- Names used do not include diacriticals or inflection marks
- Compromises are made between British and American spellings
- Users are encouraged to spell and use pronunciation marks according to their preference
- Geographical names may be the noun or adjective form, but must be consistent for the location, e.g., Canada (as in "Canada Goose" and "Canada Warbler"), not Canadian, but African (as in "African Piculet" or "African Wood Owl"), not Africa
- Compound words adhere to a set of rules designed to be consistent in their balancing of readability and the relationships of the words
- Hyphens are minimized, but for compound group names, hyphens are used only to connect two names that are themselves bird species or families, e.g., "Eagle-Owl", "Wren-Babbler", or when the combined name would be difficult to read, e.g., "Silky-flycatcher"

The committee began consideration of each species's name with reference to existing usage: if a name was in long-standing or widespread usage, it was not changed simply to correct a perceived inaccuracy. Names using such widespread words as "warbler" for multiple groups of unrelated species were let stand. Local names, however, were dropped in favor of already-established formal names. Names that were seen as offensive to a "substantial" group of people were changed. Many old geographical names were also updated. A strong preference for English words in names was expressed, although long-standing terms from other languages were generally left standing. The most important criterion was that each species was to have only one English name throughout the world, which was to be different from all other names.

The result, published in 2006, was a 199-page list of species, arranged taxonomically, and a 46-page index, giving both English and scientific names, primarily of genera and families. The taxonomy generally follows the lines set out in the third edition of Howard and Moore's Checklist of Birds of the World. A compact disk bundled with the book contains spreadsheet files that list all 10,068 species and provide additional information on their ranges.

== Reception ==
As the authors acknowledged, "Passions about bird names run high." Reviews of the book were generally favorable. Ted Floyd, editor of Birding magazine, called the book "[a] very valuable resource." S.N.G. Howell called the work a "handy little book" and "a good starting point [which] deserves serious consideration by persons interested in communicating" about birds, although the review mentions the inconsistency between this list and the AOU's names. Rick Wright, while acknowledging that "[c]onsistency is a slippery goal," called the list "a spectacularly useful resource for anyone who writes, reads, or thinks about birds outside of his or her own region" and concluded that "the committee and the editors are to be congratulated for producing a useful and useable [sic] work."

However, the American Ornithologists' Union (AOU) castigated the authors for not using the AOU's guidelines and policies, particularly in the treatment of hyphens. The AOU argued that "hyphens in compound group names indicate relationships and separate the members of the groups from less closely related forms," stating as examples that the hyphen in "Whistling-Ducks" distinguishes those birds from other ducks and the hyphen in "Storm-Petrels" separates them from other petrels in the family Procellariidae. The authors felt the need to respond. They pointed out that hyphens are not used in this fashion in fields such as herpetology and suggested that "well-intentioned hyphenation practices misrepresent phylogenetic relationships too often to be helpful." They repeated their recommendation that hyphens should be used "sparingly," and urged their fellow ornithologists to "work together to simplify the use of hyphens as one small step towards improved standardization of English bird names." Other commenters weighed in as well. Capitalization presented another dispute, and still has not reached a uniform resolution.

== Impact and legacy ==
The book sold well, but it quickly became apparent that revisions would be needed, particularly as new species were described. Although the authors stressed that their work was "a first edition", in 2009, the IOC decided not to supplement the book with a revised print edition. Instead, the list of English names is now published electronically on the IOC World Bird List website. A page on the website tabulates the spread of the list.
