= List of ornithology awards =

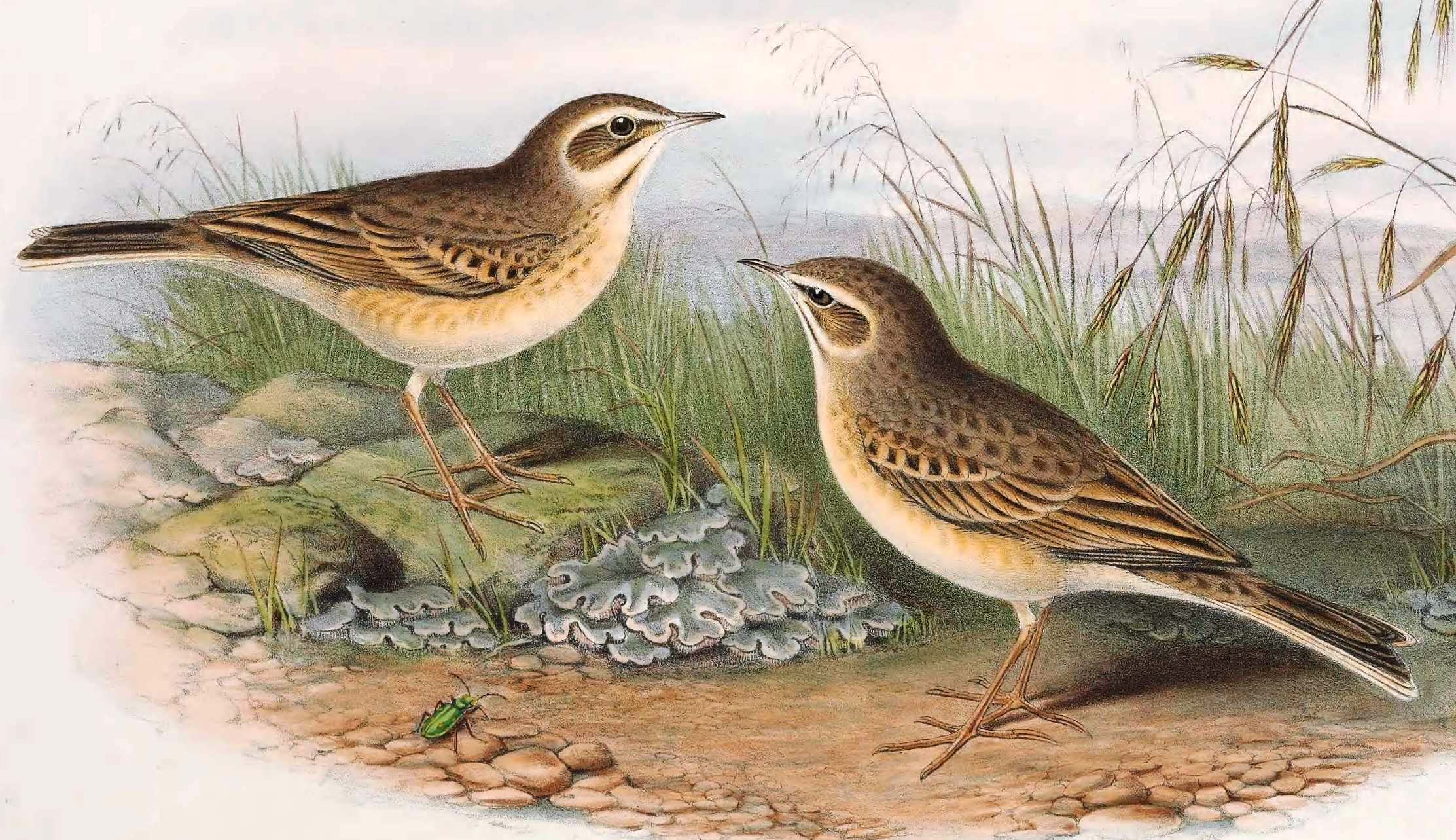
Anthus campestris. John Gould

This list of ornithology awards is an index to articles about notable awards concerning ornithology, or the study of birds, including both awards for scientists and awards for amateur birdwatchers. The list gives the country of the organization sponsoring the award, but some awards are not limited to one country.

== List ==
Country	Award	Given by
United States	Bergstrom Award	Association of Field Ornithologists
United Kingdom	Bernard Tucker Medal	British Trust for Ornithology
United States	Brewster Medal	American Ornithological Society
United States	Chandler Robbins Award	American Birding Association
United States	Claudia Wilds Award	American Birding Association
Australia	D. L. Serventy Medal	Royal Australasian Ornithologists Union
United Kingdom	Dilys Breese Medal	British Trust for Ornithology
United States	Eisenmann Medal	Linnaean Society of New York
United States	Frank M. Chapman grant	American Museum of Natural History
United Kingdom	Godman-Salvin Medal	British Ornithologists' Union
Australia	J. N. Hobbs Memorial Medal	Royal Australasian Ornithologists Union
United States	Loye and Alden Miller Research Award	Cooper Ornithological Society
United States	Ludlow Griscom Award	American Birding Association
United States	Margaret Morse Nice Medal	Wilson Ornithological Society
United Kingdom	Marsh Awards for Ornithology	British Trust for Ornithology
New Zealand	Robert Falla Memorial Award	Ornithological Society of New Zealand
United States	Robert Ridgway Award	American Birding Association
United States	Roger Tory Peterson Award	American Birding Association
Australia	S.G. 'Bill' Lane Award	Charles Sturt University
United States	Skutch Award	Association of Field Ornithologists
United Kingdom	Union Medal of the British Ornithological Union	British Ornithologists' Union
Australia	W. Roy Wheeler Medallion	Bird Observation & Conservation Australia

== See also ==
- Lists of awards
- Lists of science and technology awards
- List of biology awards
