= Ludlow Griscom Award =

US bird science award

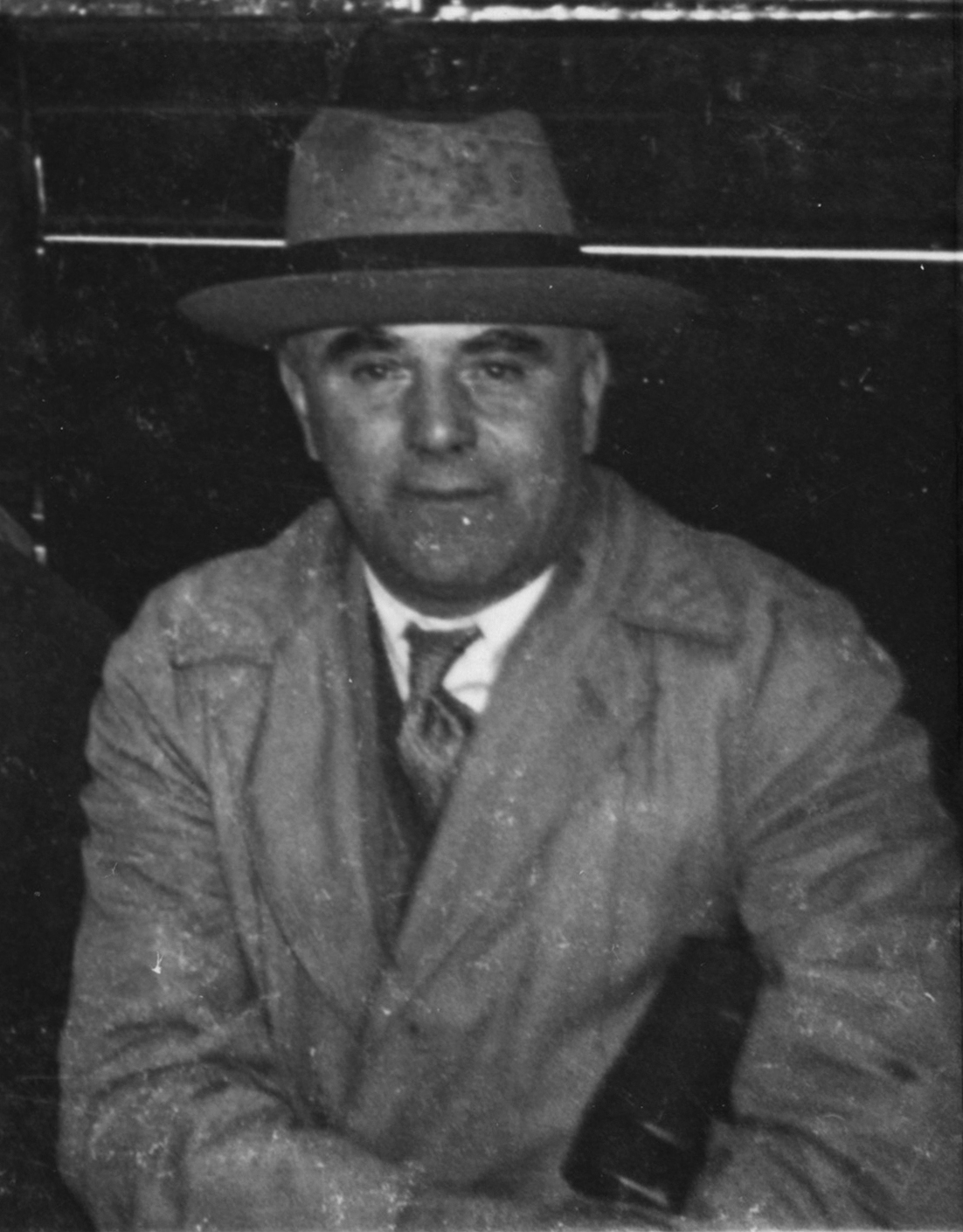
Ludlow Griscom, for whom the award is named.

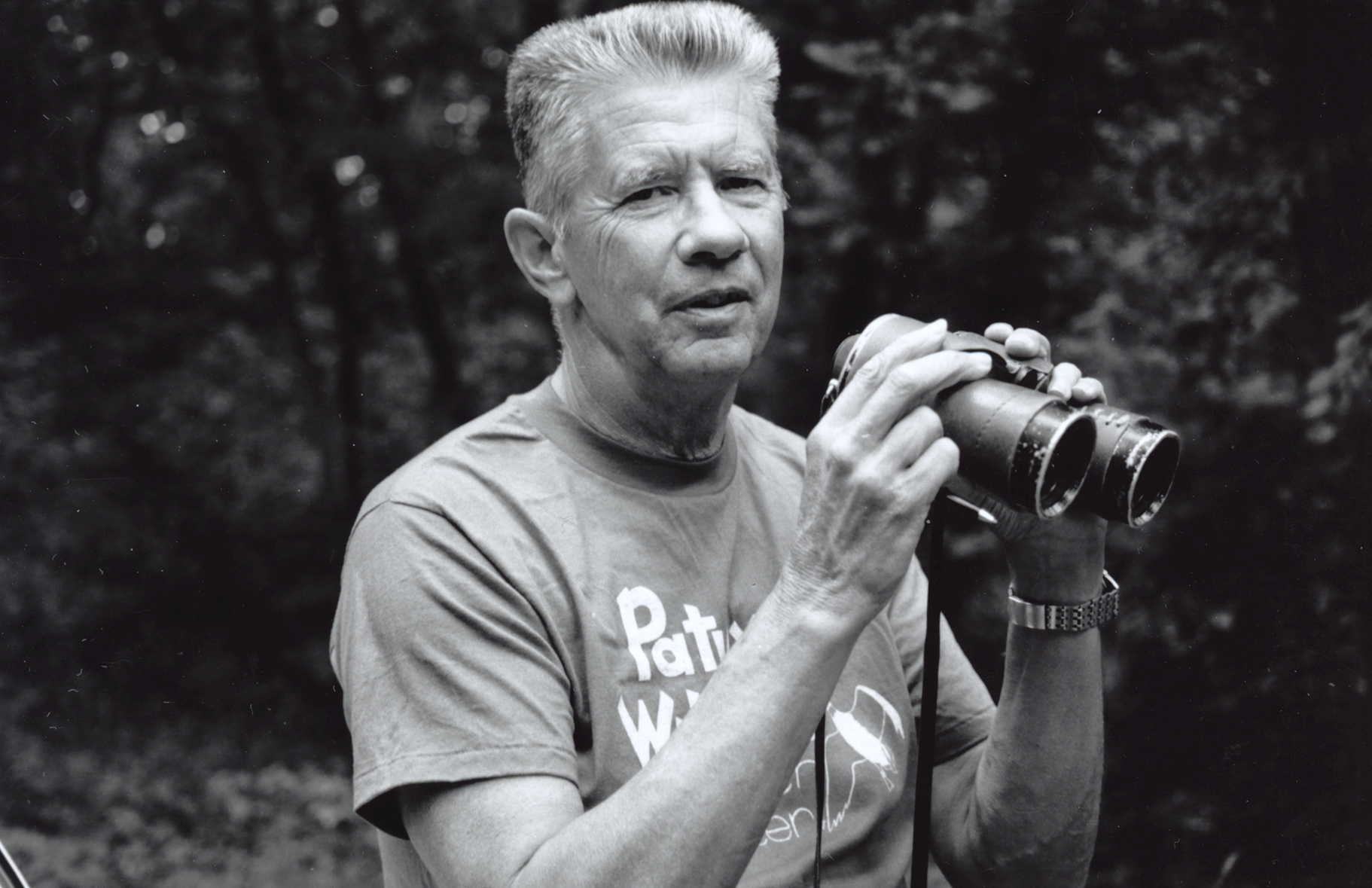
1984 recipient, Chandler Robbins

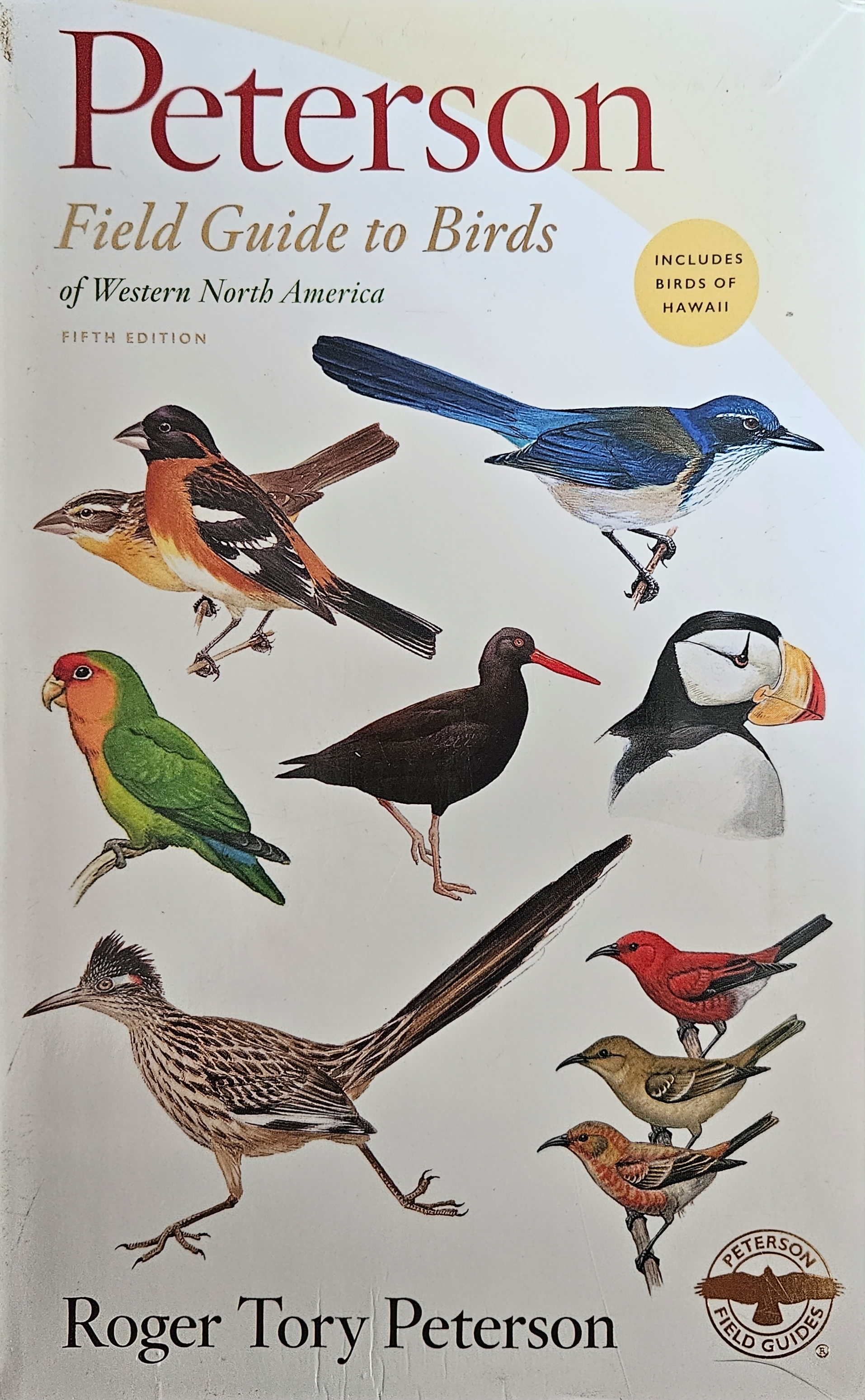
Peterson Field Guide to Birds, written by inaugural award winner Roger Tory Peterson.

The Ludlow Griscom Award for Outstanding Contributions in Regional Ornithology is an award bestowed by the American Birding Association upon individuals who are determined to have "dramatically advanced the state of ornithological knowledge for a particular region," through long-term studies of status and distribution, the writing and/or publication of field guides to birds of a certain area, work as part of a breeding bird atlas project, through the publishing of academic papers on regional ornithology, or through their efforts in inspiring and teaching about the subject of birding.

One of five awards presented by the ABA for contributions to ornithology, the award is named after Ludlow Griscom, considered the "Dean of the Birdwatchers", a pioneer in field ornithology, and one of the first ornithologists to stress the importance of identification of birds in the field as opposed to the collection of specimens. The Ludlow Griscom Award was first presented to Roger Tory Peterson, considered the father of the modern field guide, in 1980. In its early years, the award was more broadly designated to recognize "outstanding contributions to excellence in field birding." After being awarded in 1981, it was awarded biennially from 1984 to 1998; since then, it has been awarded on an annual basis.

== List of winners ==
Since the award's inception in 1980, there have been 34 recipients, including several years in which more than one award was given.

Year	Name	Notes
1980	Roger Tory Peterson	ABA also grants the Roger Tory Peterson Award
1981	Olin Sewall Pettingill, Jr.	
1984	Chandler Robbins	ABA also grants the Chandler Robbins Award
1986	Jim Lane	
1988	Susan Roney Drennan	
1990	Guy McCaskie	
1992	Kenn Kaufman	Youngest award winner
1994	Theodore A. Parker III	Posthumous award
1996	Richard Pough	
1998	Claudia Wilds	Posthumous award; ABA also grants the Claudia Wilds Award
1999	Stuart Keith	First president of the ABA
2000	W. Earl Godfrey	
2001	Peter Pyle	
2002	Rich Stallcup	
2003	Bob and Martha Sargent	
2004	Bret Whitney	
2005	Wayne R. Petersen	
2006	James Dinsmore	
2007	Ruth Green	
2008	Bill Fenimore	
2009	Jim McCormac	
2010	Joseph Morlan	
2011	Tom Rusert	
2012	Mark Lockwood	
2012	Ian A. McLaren	
2013	Geoffrey Williamson	
2014	Kenneth Brock	
2014	Tom Kent	
2015	Dale Zimmerman	
2016	Keith Russell	
2018	Debra Love ("Debi") Shearwater	
2018	Alan R. Smith	
2018	Daphne Gemmill	
2024	Ned Brinkley	
2024	Brian Patteson	

== See also ==
- List of ornithology awards
