= Charles Walcott =

Charles Walcott may refer to:

- Charles Walcott (MP) (1733–1799), British politician
- Charles F. Walcott (1836–1887), American Union brevet brigadier general during the American Civil War
- Charles Doolittle Walcott (1850–1927), American invertebrate paleontologist
  - SS Charles D. Walcott, a Liberty ship
- Charles Walcott (ethologist) (born 1934), American ethologist
