= Robert S. Ridgely =

American ornithologist

Robert Sterling Ridgely (born 14 January 1946) is an American ornithologist, specializing in the neotropics. He is the co-author of three books on neotropical ornithology: the field guide The Birds of Panama (with John Gwynne), The Birds of Ecuador (with Paul Greenfield), and The Birds of South America (with Guy Tudor), of which two monumental volumes (out of four), covering the passerines, have appeared. He was long affiliated with the Academy of Natural Sciences in Philadelphia, then Vice-President at the American Bird Conservancy until 2006. In 2001 he was awarded the Linnaean Society of New York's Eisenmann Medal. In 2006, he received the Chandler Robbins Award from the American Birding Association. He served as President of the Rainforest Trust until 2021, then becoming President Emeritus, and is one of the founders of the conservation NGO Fundación de Conservación Jocotoco which, working with the Trust, owns and manages ten nature reserves in Ecuador.

== Documentation of the bird that barks ==
Ridgely and fellow birder John Moore documented a new antpitta during their trek through the Andes in Southern Ecuador near the Podocarpus National Park in November 1997. The bird was known to local farmers as "Jocotoco" according to a sign at the discovery site. The bird is peculiar because of its unique call: it hoots and it barks. The bird was named jocotoco antpitta (Grallaria ridgelyi). Ridgely's antpitta is one of the largest birds newly documented within the past 50 years. He suspects that it went undetected by scientists for so long because either it has a very small range or it barks only during a short breeding season.
