= John W. Fitzpatrick =

American ornithologist

John Weaver Fitzpatrick
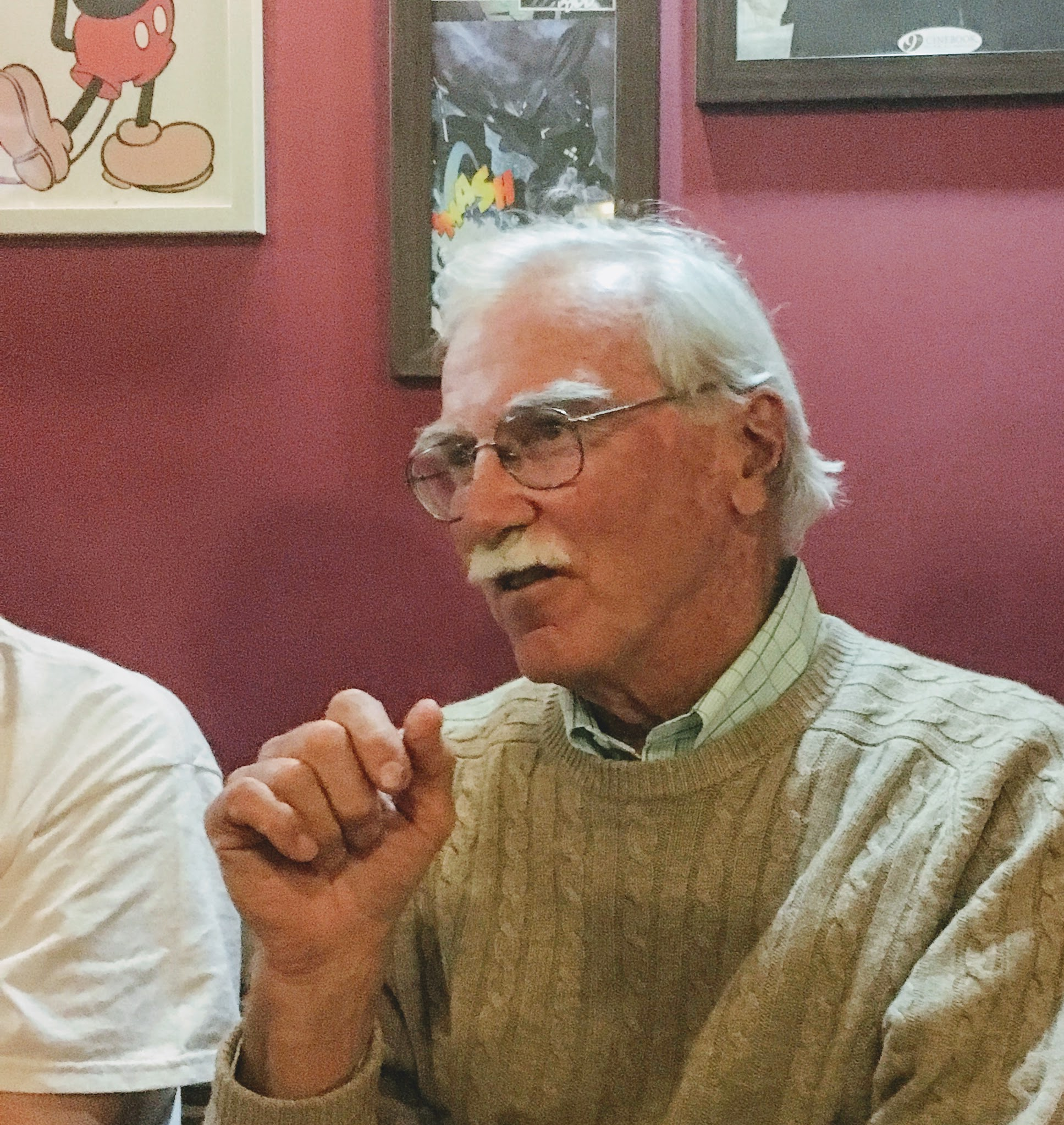
- Fitzpatrick in conversation with Bangalore birdwatchers after a talk about bird conservation in January 2017
- Born: September 17, 1951 (age 75); Saint Paul, Minnesota, U.S.
- Education: Harvard University
- Occupations: Ornithology, Conservation
- Employer: Cornell Lab of Ornithology
- Known for: Conservation of Florida Scrub Jay, eBird
- Awards: Brewster Medal, Eisenmann Medal
- Website: Message on Cornell Lab of Ornithology

John Weaver Fitzpatrick (born September 17, 1951, in Saint Paul, Minnesota) is an American ornithologist primarily known for his research work on the South American avifauna and for the conservation of the Florida scrub jay. He was the Louis Agassiz Fuertes Director of the Cornell Lab of Ornithology from 1995 to 2021.

== Early life ==
In 1974, Fitzpatrick graduated magna cum laude from Harvard University with a B.A. in biology. His early inspiration to work on Bird conservation came from a talk by John Terborgh and his travels in the summer of 1974 Manú National Park in south-eastern Peru. His summer in Peru made him change his plans from pursuing graduate study in University of California, Berkeley. In 1978, he earned a Ph.D. in biology from Princeton University for his study of the foraging behaviour of tyrant flycatchers in Manu.

== Early ornithological career ==
After his PhD, he moved to the Field Museum of Natural History in Chicago as its curator. In 1988, he left for Florida to take over as the executive director and senior research biologist at the Archbold Biological Station, a private ecological research foundation in central Florida. Much of his early research focused upon neotropical avifauna. He travelled many times to remote areas of South America, in particular to the western Amazonian basin and to the Andean foothills. In 1996, he published Neotropical Birds: Ecology and Conservation, a comprehensive synthesis of ecological information of the region covering 4037 species of birds from Mexico south to Tierra del Fuego. Along with other biologists, Fitzpatrick has described several species and sub-species new to science such as bar-winged wood wren, cinnamon screech owl, royal sunangel, Manu antbird, the cinnamon-breasted tody-tyrant, and the cinnamon-faced tyrannulet.

=== Conservation of the Florida Scrub Jay ===
Fitzpatrick's current research focuses on the ecology, conservation biology, and population genetics of the endangered Florida scrub jay, based on a nearly 50-year field study of a color-banded population since his work at Archbold biological station. He began studying the species in 1972 with Glen Everett Woolfenden. In 1985, Fitzpatrick and Woolfenden earned a Brewster Medal for their long-term study, the highest research award given by the American Ornithologists' Union. His work on this species has helped slow its decline.

=== Other work on bird conservation ===
From 1995 to 2005, Fitzpatrick was on the board of trustees of The Nature Conservancy. He has served on many professional ornithological committees, two species recovery teams (for the Hawaiian crow and the ivory-billed woodpecker), and advisory boards right up to the present. He has served on the National Audubon Society Board of Directors and has been the President of American Ornithologists' Union (AOU) from 2000 to 2002. Under his leadership, the Cornell Lab of Ornithology has become a global leader in public engagement with birds and bird conservation through widely accessed online resources such as Avian Knowledge Network and Citizen science platforms such as eBird. Public data from the eBird platform is used worldwide to guide and plan conservation programs, study climate change and study bird occurrence and migration patterns.

== Directorship at Cornell Lab of Ornithology ==
In 1995, Fitzpatrick became the Louis Agassiz Fuertes Director of the Cornell Lab of Ornithology in Ithaca, New York, succeeding Charles Walcott. He is also a professor in ecology and evolutionary biology at Cornell University. He continues to teach and mentor graduate and undergraduate students. He stepped down from the position in 2021, succeeded by Ian Owens.

== Awards and achievements ==
In 2005, Fitzpatrick won the Eisenmann Medal from the Linnaean Society of New York. In 2011, he was honored with the AOU's Marion A. Jenkinson Service Award, given in memory of Marion Anne Jenkinson (1937–1994), former AOU treasurer. For his achievements in the study of Peruvian birds and his guidance to a new generation of ornithologists, the newly described Sira barbet of Peru was named in his honor in 2012. In 2016, in a rare instance, the American Ornithologists' Union awarded him a second time (after the Brewster Medal) with the Ralph W. Schreiber Conservation Award.
