= Claudia Wilds Award =

Award by the American Birding Association

The ABA Claudia Wilds Award for Distinguished Service is an award given by the American Birding Association to a member who has given "long and useful service to the organization," either as a volunteer or as compensated staff, in recognition of the member's dedicated energy and years of service.

One of five awards presented by the ABA for contributions to birding, the award is named in honor of Claudia Wilds (1931–1997), who made many contributions to ornithology and the ABA. Wilds was author of an important bird finding guide to the mid-Atlantic states and co-author of a handbook of the world's terns and skimmers, completed after her death. Wilds served on the board of the ABA, was an associate editor of Birding magazine, wrote articles for The Audubon Society Master Guide to Birding, and was a consultant in the preparation of the National Geographic Society's field guide. She herself was posthumously awarded the ABA's Ludlow Griscom Award in 1998.

The Claudia Wilds Award was first bestowed on Larry Balch in 2000.

== List of recipients ==
The award was introduced in 2000.

Year	Name	Notes
2000	Larry Balch	Past ABA president
2001	Bob Berman	
2001	Cindy Lippincott	
2002	Dan Williams	Past ABA president
2003	Paul Baicich	
2005	Hugh Willoughby	
2009	Jane Kostenko and J. Tyler Bell	
2010	John Kricher	
2014	Allan Keith	Past ABA president
2017	Lou Morrell	
2024	Julie Davis	

== See also ==
- List of ornithology awards
