= Dean Amadon =

American ornithologist (1912–2003)

Dean Arthur Amadon
- Born: June 5, 1912; Milwaukee, Wisconsin
- Died: January 12, 2003 (aged 90); Tenafly, New Jersey
- Awards: Eisenmann Medal
- Scientific career
- Fields: Ornithology
- Workplaces: American Museum of Natural History; American Ornithologists' Union; Linnaean Society

Dean Arthur Amadon (June 5, 1912 – January 12, 2003) was an American ornithologist and an authority on birds of prey.

Amadon was born in Milwaukee, Wisconsin to Arthur and Mary Amadon. He received a BS from Hobart College in 1934 and a Ph.D. from Cornell University in 1947. In 1937 he joined the American Museum of Natural History in New York City and was Chairman of the Department of Ornithology there from 1957 until 1973. In 1942, he married Octavia Gardella and had two daughters: Susan Avis and Emily Yvonne.

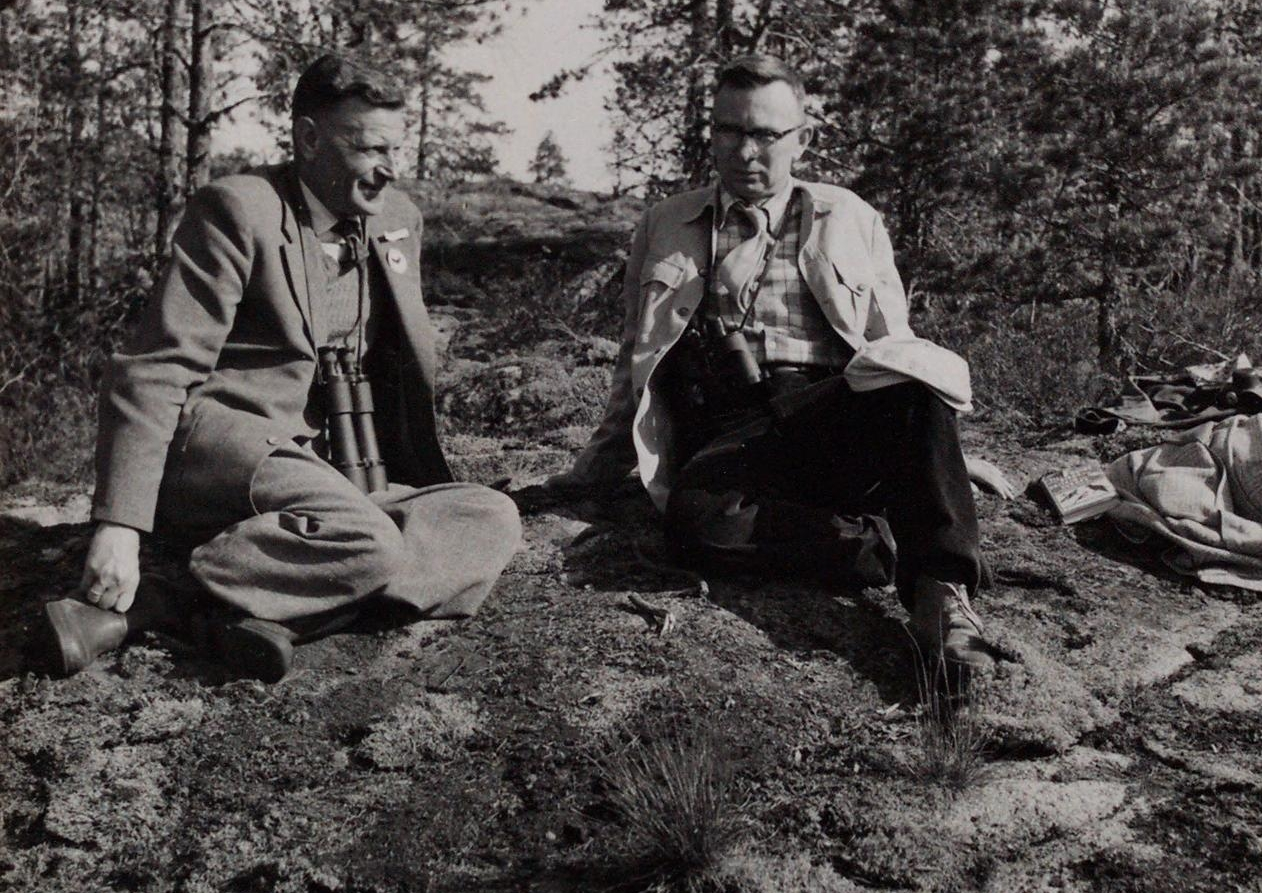
George Junge and Dean Amadon in Vesterkulla, Finland, June 8, 1958.

Amadon was a member of the American Association for the Advancement of Science, president of the American Ornithologists' Union from 1964 to 1966 and Linnaean Society of New York. He joined The Explorers Club in 1959. His books include Birds Around the World: A Geographical Look at Evolution and Birds (1966), Eagles, Hawks and Falcons of the World (1968) with Leslie H. Brown, and Curassows and Related Birds (1973) with Jean Delacour (2nd edition, 2004). He died on January 12, 2003, in his home at 25 Kenwood Road, Tenafly, New Jersey.

== Sources ==
- Bock, Walter J. (2003). "Obituaries: Dean Amadon, 1912–2003". Ibis. 145 (4): 716. doi:10.1046/j.1474-919X.2003.00238_1.x.
- Short, Lester L. (2003). "In Memoriam: Dean Amadon, 1912-2003". Auk. 120 (4): 1195–1198. doi:10.1642/0004-8038(2003)120[1195:IMDA]2.0.CO;2. S2CID 85593616.
- http://www.wku.edu/~smithch/chronob/AMAD1912.htm
