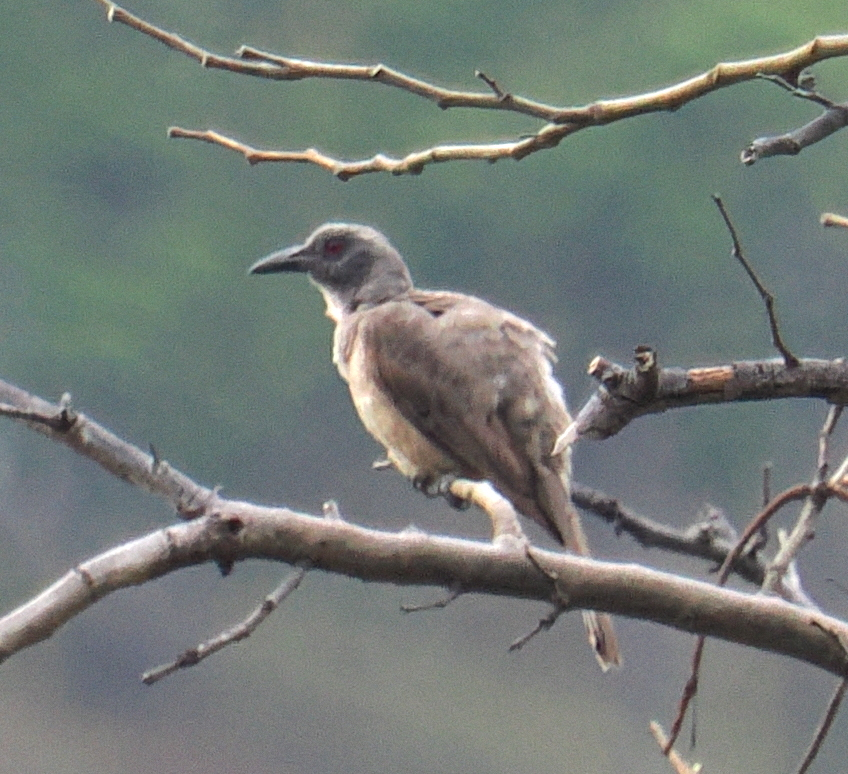

Conservation status
- Least Concern (IUCN 3.1)

Scientific classification
- Kingdom: Animalia
- Phylum: Chordata
- Class: Aves
- Order: Passeriformes
- Family: Oriolidae
- Genus: Oriolus
- Species: O. finschi

Binomial name
- Oriolus finschi Hartert, 1904

= Wetar oriole =

Species of bird

The Wetar oriole (Oriolus finschi) is a species of bird in the family Oriolidae. It is endemic to the Lesser Sundas, where it is found on Wetar and Atauro Islands. Its natural habitats are subtropical or tropical dry forests and subtropical or tropical mangrove forests.

== Taxonomy and systematics ==
The Wetar oriole was originally described as a separate species but was later reclassified as a subspecies. However, more recent revisions to the IOC World Bird List have found it to be a distinct species. This species and the Timor oriole were formerly grouped together as olive-brown oriole.
