= Eugene Eisenmann =

Panamanian-American lawyer and amateur ornithologist

Eugene "Gene" Eisenmann (19 February 1906 – 16 October 1981) was an American and Panamanian lawyer and amateur ornithologist of German-Jewish ancestry. He had a long association with the Linnaean Society of New York (LSNY) as well as with the American Ornithologists' Union (AOU) and the American Museum of Natural History (AMNH). He was an expert on Neotropical birds.

== Biography ==
Eisenmann was born in Panama and, though he was based throughout his adult life in New York City, he returned to Panama almost annually in order to study the birdlife and visit his family. He was bilingual in English and Spanish. He received a law degree from Harvard Law School in 1930 and was a partner in the New York law firm of Proskauer Rose until 1956.

== Ornithology ==
Eisenmann served as President of the LSNY from 1947 to 1949, and was later elected a Fellow. In 1956, he resigned from the legal profession to pursue his interest in studying the birds of Central America and the adjacent region. The following year, he became a Research Associate of the AMNH, a position he held until his death. He was editor of the AOU's journal The Auk in 1958–59, vice president of the AOU in 1967–69, and chairman of the AOU's Check-list Committee from 1966 until his death. He was a member of the International Commission on Zoological Nomenclature. He published over 150 papers on ornithology, and his The Species of Middle American Birds is Volume 7 of the Transactions of the LSNY. He also co-wrote The Species of Birds of South America with Rodolphe Meyer de Schauensee.

== Legacy ==
Following Eisenmann's death from a heart attack in 1981, the LSNY established the Eisenmann Medal, an award to recognise ornithological excellence and encourage amateur ornithologists, with the inaugural award being made to Ernst Mayr in 1983.

In 2000 the Fundación Avifauna Eugene Eisenmann (Eugene Eisenmann Bird Foundation) was established in Panama by a group of Panamanian and American bird lovers with the mission of protecting Panama's birds and their habitats. In 2003 it obtained a 20 ha concession at Pipeline Road in central Panama for the construction of the Panama Rainforest Discovery Center in the Soberanía National Park.
