= Karen L. Wiebe =

Canadian ornithologist

- Education: University of Saskatchewan
- Scientific career
- Fields: Ornithology
- Workplaces: University of Saskatchewan
- Website: https://www.usask.ca/biology/wiebe/

Karen L. Wiebe is a Canadian ornithologist and the former Stuart and Mary Houston Professor of Ornithology in the Department of Biology at the University of Saskatchewan in Saskatoon, Saskatchewan.

== Education ==
Wiebe received her doctorate at the University of Saskatchewan in 1993.

== Research ==
Wiebe and her students focus on basic research in avian biology and behavior. She studies the ecology and theoretical behavior of birds, with particular attention to their reproductive success. Factors influencing reproductive success can include habitat, predation, availability of food, and selection of nest sites. Among the birds that she studies are northern flickers, bluebirds and tree swallows. Wiebe leads a long-term study which began in 1997, of flickers at Riske Creek, British Columbia.
