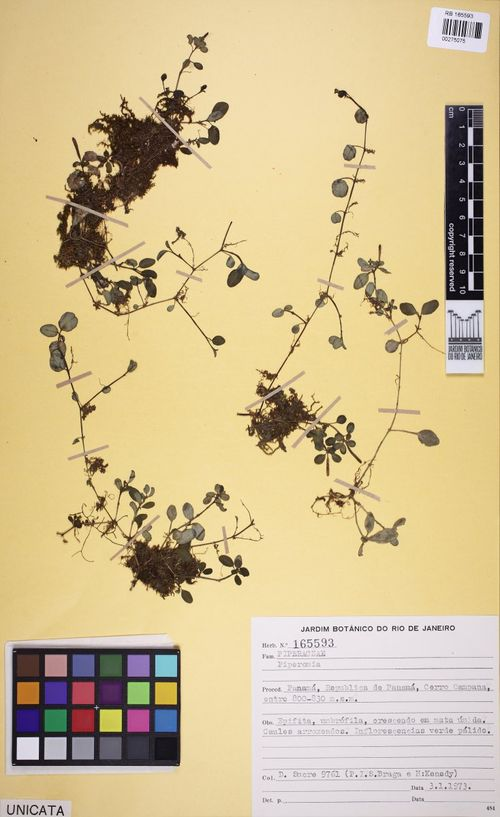

Scientific classification
- Kingdom: Plantae
- Clade: Tracheophytes
- Clade: Angiosperms
- Clade: Magnoliids
- Order: Piperales
- Family: Piperaceae
- Genus: Peperomia
- Species: P. gleicheniiformis

Binomial name
- Peperomia gleicheniiformis Trel.

= Peperomia gleicheniiformis =

Species of epiphyte

Peperomia gleicheniiformis is a species of epiphyte in the genus Peperomia that is native to Costa Rica, Panama, and Colombia. It grows on wet tropical biomes. Its conservation status is Threatened.

== Description ==
The type specimen were collected near Huancabamba, Peru.

Peperomia gleicheniiformis is a small, essentially glabrous, stoloniferous herb. The stems are geniculate-flexuous, quickly becoming divaricately forking in a spreading pattern, and are barely 1 mm thick. The alternate leaves are either elliptic, measuring 10 mm long and 5 mm wide, or narrowly lanceolate, reaching 20 mm long and 8 mm wide. They are acute at both ends, 3-nerved, and firm when dry. The petiole is 2–3 mm long. The terminal spikes are 25 mm long and 1 mm thick, with conical pseudopedicels, and are borne on a slender peduncle 5 mm long. The berries are subglobose with an oblique stigma.

== Taxonomy and naming ==
It was described in 1936 by William Trelease in Publications of the Field Museum of Natural History, Botanical Series 13, from specimens collected by Alexander F. Skutch. The epithet gleicheniiformis means "having the form of Gleichenia", referring to the plant's resemblance to these ferns in its slender, repeatedly forking stems.

== Distribution and habitat ==
It is native to Costa Rica to Colombia. It grows as a epiphyte and is a herb. It grows on wet tropical biomes.

== Conservation ==
This species is assessed as Threatened, in a preliminary report.
