= Robert Ridgway Award =

Award from the American Birding Association

The ABA Robert Ridgway Award for Publications in Field Ornithology is an award given by the American Birding Association to an individual who has made significant contributions to the field ornithology literature in the areas of North American bird distribution and field identification. The award may honor a writer or an artist.

One of five awards presented by the ABA for contributions to ornithology, the award is named in honor of Robert Ridgway, initiator of a monumental work of bird systematics, as well as one of the first color nomenclature systems for bird identification.

The award was first bestowed on Harold Mayfield.

== List of recipients ==
Year	Name	Notes
2002	Harold Mayfield	
2004	Susan M. Smith	
2005	Steve N. G. Howell	
2006	Donald Kroodsma	
2007	Bill Clark	
2008	Bill Thompson III	
2012	Richard Crossley	
2017	Jerry Liguori	
2024	Amar Ayyash	

== See also ==
- List of ornithology awards
