= Donald Kroodsma =

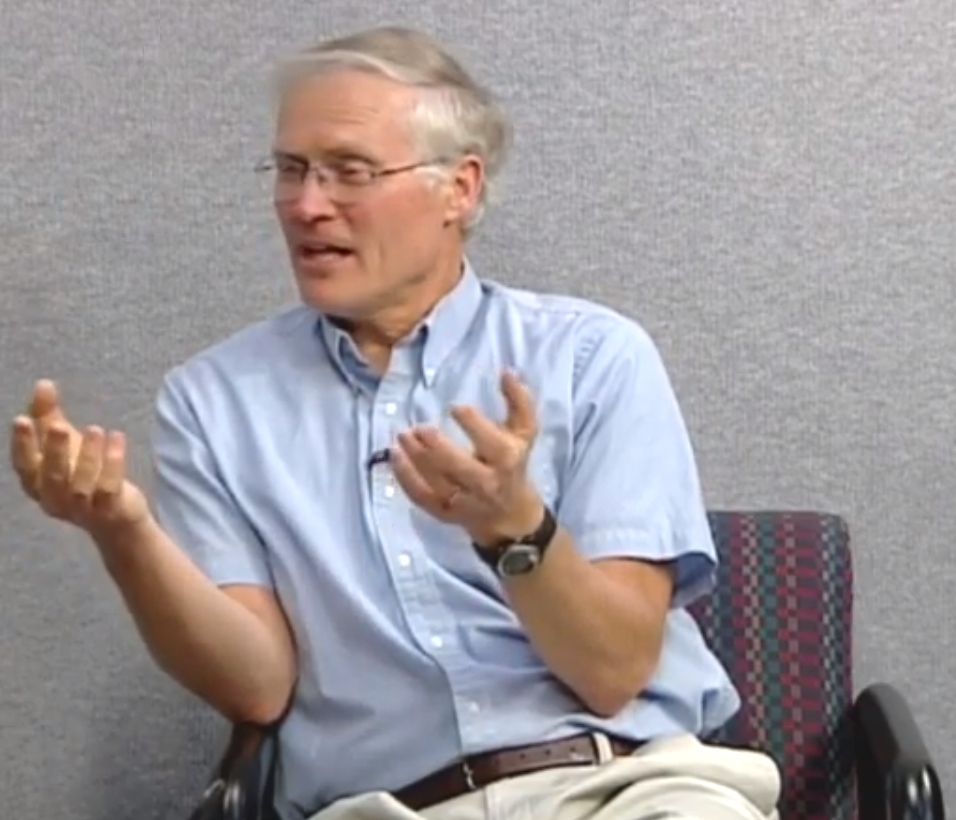
Kroodsma in May 2006

Donald Eugene Kroodsma (born 7 July 1946 in Zeeland, Michigan) is an American author and ornithologist, one of the world's leading experts on the science of birdsong.

== Education and career ==
He received in 1968 his B.A. from Hope College in Holland, Michigan and in 1972 his Ph.D. from Oregon State University under John A. Wiens with dissertation Singing behavior of the Bewick's wren: development, dialects, population structure, and geographical variation. Kroodsma was from 1972 to 1974 a postdoc and from 1974 to 1980 an assistant professor at Rockefeller University. He was from 1980 to 1987 an associate professor and from 1987 to 2003 a full professor and is since 2004 a professor emeritus at the University of Massachusetts, Amherst.

His research deals with vocal behavior in birds, including neural control, evolution, ontogeny, and ecology. He was an associate editor from 1996 to 2003 for the encyclopedia Birds of North America and from 1998 to 2002 for the journal The Auk.

== Awards and honors ==
- 2003 — Elliott Coues Award from the American Ornithologists’ Union
- 2006 — John Burroughs Medal for natural history writing, for The Singing Life of Birds
- 2006 — Robert Ridgway Award from the American Birding Association "given for excellence in publications pertaining to field ornithology"
- 2014 — Margaret Morse Nice Medal from the Wilson Ornithological Society

== Selected publications ==
=== Articles ===
- Kroodsma, D. E. (1976). "Reproductive development in a female songbird: differential stimulation by quality of male song". Science. 192 (4239): 574–575. Bibcode:1976Sci...192..574K. doi:10.1126/science.192.4239.574. PMID 17745657. S2CID 39089666.
- Kroodsma, Donald E. (1977). "Correlates of song organization among North American wrens". American Naturalist. 111 (981): 995–1008. doi:10.1086/283228. S2CID 85156300.
- with Roberta Pickert: Kroodsma, Donald E.; Pickert, Roberta (1980). "Environmentally dependent sensitive periods for avian vocal learning". Nature. 288 (5790): 477–479. Bibcode:1980Natur.288..477K. doi:10.1038/288477a0. S2CID 4317167.
- with Richard A. Canady and Fernando Nottebohm: Canady, R. A.; Kroodsma, D. E.; Nottebohm, F. (1984). "Population differences in complexity of a learned skill are correlated with the brain space involved". Proceedings of the National Academy of Sciences. 81 (19): 6232–6234. Bibcode:1984PNAS...81.6232C. doi:10.1073/pnas.81.19.6232. PMC 391894. PMID 6592611.
- Kroodsma, Donald E. (1984). "Songs of the Alder Flycatcher (Empidonax alnorum) and Willow Flycatcher (Empidonax traillii) are innate". Auk. 101 (1): 13–24. doi:10.1093/auk/101.1.13. JSTOR 4086218.
- Kroodsma, Donald E. (1989). "Suggested experimental designs for song playbacks". Animal Behaviour. 37: 600–609. doi:10.1016/0003-3472(89)90039-0. S2CID 53161188.
- with Bruce E. Byers: Kroodsma, Donald E.; Byers, Bruce E. (1991). "The function(s) of bird song". American Zoologist. 31 (2): 318–328. doi:10.1093/icb/31.2.318. JSTOR 3883409.
- with Masakazu Konishi: Kroodsma, Donald E.; Konishi, Masakazu (1991). "A suboscine bird (eastern phoebe, Sayornis phoebe) develops normal song without auditory feedback". Animal Behaviour. 42 (3): 477–487. doi:10.1016/S0003-3472(05)80047-8. S2CID 53202327.

=== Books ===
- as editor with Edward H. Miller: Acoustic communication in birds. Vol. 1. Production, perception, and design features of sounds. New York: Academic Press. 1982. Kroodsma (2012-12-02). 2012 edition. ISBN 978-0-12-426801-2; pkb
- as editor with E. H. Miller: Acoustic communication in birds. Vol. 2. Song learning and its consequences. New York: Academic Press. 1982. ISBN 9780080924175.
- as editor with E. H. Miller: Ecology and Evolution of Acoustic Communication in Birds. Ithaca, NY: Cornell University Press.
- The Singing Life of Birds. The Art and Science of Listening to Birdsong. Boston: Houghton-Mifflin Co. 2005. Kroodsma, Donald (2015-02-17). 2015 edition. ISBN 978-0-618-40568-8; pbk, drawings by Nancy Haver
- The Backyard Birdsong Guide. Eastern and Central North America. San Francisco: Chronicle Books. 2008. ISBN 9780811863421.
- The Backyard Birdsong Guide. Western North America. San Francisco: Chronicle Books. 2008. ISBN 9780811863971.
- Birdsong by the Seasons: A Year of Listening to Birds. Boston: Houghton-Mifflin Harcourt Co. 2009. ISBN 9780544764224.
- Listening to a Continent Sing: Birdsong by Bicycle from the Atlantic to the Pacific. Princeton University Press. 2016. ISBN 9781400880324.
