= Olin Sewall Pettingill Jr. =

American naturalist, author and filmmaker

- Sewall Pettingill and wife, Eleanor
- Born: October 30, 1907; Belgrade, Maine, U.S.
- Died: December 11, 2001 (aged 94); Bedford, Texas, U.S.
- Education: Bowdoin College; Cornell University; University of Michigan
- Known for: Ornithology
- Awards: Ludlow Griscom Award, Eisenmann Medal
- Scientific career
- Fields: Biology
- Workplaces: Cornell Laboratory of Ornithology

Olin Sewall Pettingill Jr. (Note: Largely known simply as Sewall Pettingill, as he preferred to be called) (October 30, 1907 – December 11, 2001) was an American naturalist, author and filmmaker, president of the Wilson Ornithological Society from 1948 to 1950, a member of the board of directors of the National Audubon Society from 1955 to 1974, and a Life Fellow of the American Ornithologists' Union.

== Early life ==
Born October 30, 1907, in Belgrade, Maine, Pettingill attended Bowdoin College, where he developed an interest in ornithology. Studying under zoologist Alfred O. Gross, Pettingill conducted studies of the last three heath hens on Martha's Vineyard in 1927 with Gross and Thornton Burgess.

In 1928, Pettingill enrolled in the University of Michigan, then attended graduate school at Cornell University starting in 1930 – joining the AOU in the same year – where he conducted a PhD dissertation on the American woodcock.

== Career ==
Appointed a delegate to the 12th and 14th International Ornithological Congresses, Pettingill was appointed Director of the Cornell Laboratory of Ornithology in 1960, a position he held until his retirement in 1973, and provided footage for four Walt Disney nature films, including the Academy Award-winning The Vanishing Prairie, in addition to making several ornithological films of his own, including works on albatrosses, penguins, and the wildlife of island nations, which often aired as part of Audubon Screen Tours.

Tenured at Carleton College for 17 years, Pettingill taught at the University of Michigan Biological Station for 35 years. Pettingill was awarded birding's highest honor, the Ludlow Griscom Award, in 1982, and also received Cornell's Arthur A. Allen Medal in 1974, and the Eisenmann Medal in 1985. Holding three honorary doctorates in science, Pettingill appeared on both The Today Show and To Tell the Truth.

== Death ==
Pettingill died December 11, 2001, in Bedford, Texas, aged 94.

== Works ==
Books

- Ornithology in Laboratory and Field, 1939 (2nd edition, 1946; 3rd edition, 1956; 4th edition, 1970; 5th edition, 1985); 2013 pbk reprint of 4th edition
- A Guide to Finding Birds East of the Mississippi, 1951
- A Guide to Finding Birds West of the Mississippi, 1953
- Enjoying Maine Birds, 1960
- Enjoying Birds in Upstate New York, 1963
- Enjoying Birds around New York City, 1966
- The Audubon Illustrated handbook of American Birds, editor-in-chief, 1968.
- The Bird Watcher's America, editor, 1974
- Another Penguin Summer, 1975
- My Way to Ornithology, 1992

Films

- Nature's Half Acre, 1951
- Water Birds, 1952
- The Vanishing Prairie, 1954
- Islands of the Sea, 1960
