= Association of Field Ornithologists =

American ornithological society

- Abbreviation: AFO
- Predecessor: Northeastern Bird-Banding Association
- Formation: 1922
- Type: NGO
- Purpose: Ornithology
- Region served: Americas
- Official language: English, Español, Português
- Website: www.afonet.org

The Association of Field Ornithologists (AFO) is an American ornithological society, with a strong focus on field studies and banding, priding itself as serving as a bridge between professional and amateur ornithologists. It was founded in 1922 as the New England Bird Banding Association, then becoming the Northeastern Bird-Banding Association, before expanding its geographical scope and acquiring its current name. It publishes a twice-yearly newsletter, AFO Afield, as well as the quarterly Journal of Field Ornithology. The AFO is a member of the Ornithological Council.

== Awards ==
=== Skutch Award ===
Officially named The Pamela and Alexander F. Skutch Research Award, the Skutch Award of up to US$10,000 is presented annually. Applications may be made in English, Spanish or Portuguese by 15 July for the following year. Preference is given to those who propose field research from a Neotropical base.

The Skutch Award is named for Alexander Skutch.

=== Bergstrom Award ===
The Bergstrom Research Award is presented annually in honor of E. Alexander Bergstrom.

== Journal ==
The AFO publishes the quarterly Journal of Field Ornithology. It was previously known as the Bulletin of the Northeastern Bird-Banding Association (1925–1929) and Bird-Banding (1930–1979).

== See also ==
- List of ornithology awards
