= Alexander Skutch =

American ornithologist

Alexander Frank Skutch
- Born: May 20, 1904; Baltimore, Maryland
- Died: May 12, 2004 (aged 99); San Isidro de El General, Costa Rica
- Education: Johns Hopkins University
- Spouse: Pamela Lankester
- Scientific career
- Fields: Ornithology; Botany; Philosophy
- Author abbrev. (botany): Skutch

Alexander Frank Skutch (May 20, 1904 – May 12, 2004) was a naturalist and writer. He published numerous scientific papers and books about birds and several books on philosophy. He is best remembered ornithologically for his pioneering work on helpers at the nest.

== Biography ==
Alexander Skutch was born in Baltimore, Maryland. He received a doctorate in botany from Johns Hopkins University in 1928. He then found employment with United Fruit Company, which had a problem with banana diseases, for which it needed the expertise of a botanist. After an initial stay in Jamaica, Skutch traveled to Guatemala, Panama and Honduras. During this time he fell in love with the tropics and also acquired a deep interest in birds. He began studying their habits. Skutch collected plants for museums to make money, but observing birds remained his life's main focus.

In 1941 Skutch purchased a farm in Costa Rica. There, as an author of one of his obituaries wrote:

A lifelong vegetarian, Skutch grew corn, yucca and other crops, and, without running water until the 1990s, bathed and drank from the nearest stream. He believed in "treading lightly on the mother Earth". With his wife Pamela, daughter of the English naturalist, botanist, and orchidologist Charles H. Lankester, whom he married in 1950, and their adopted son Edwin, he stayed there for the rest of his life.

Skutch wrote over 40 books and over 200 papers on ornithology, preferring a descriptive style and eschewing statistics and even banding. He died eight days before his 100th birthday, in the same year that he received the Loye and Alden Miller Research Award. He is universally regarded as one of the world's greatest ornithologists.

== Selected publications ==
As well as numerous contributions to the scientific literature, books and book-length papers authored or coauthored by Skutch include:

- 1954 – Life Histories of Central American Birds I: Families Fringillidae, Thraupidae, Icteridae, Parulidae and Coerebidae. (Pacific Coast Avifauna No.31). Cooper Ornithological Society: Berkeley. PDF
- 1960 – Life Histories of Central American Birds II: Families Vireonidae, Sylviidae, Turdidae, Troglodytidae, Paridae, Corvidae, Hirundinidae and Tyrannidae. (Pacific Coast Avifauna No.34). Cooper Ornithological Society: Berkeley. PDF
- 1967 – Life histories of Central American highland birds. (Publications of the Nuttall Ornithological Club No.7). Harvard University: Cambridge. BHL
- 1969 – Life histories of Central American birds III: Families Cotingidae, Pipridae, Formicariidae, Furnariidae, Dendrocolaptidae, and Picidae. (Pacific Coast Avifauna No.35). Cooper Ornithological Society: Berkeley. PDF
- 1970 – The Golden Core of Religion. Holt, Rinehart and Winston: New York. ISBN 0-03-085082-7
- 1971 – A Naturalist in Costa Rica. University of Florida Press: Gainesville. ISBN 0-8130-0312-1. Internet Archive, 1992 2nd edition, registration required
- 1972 – Studies of Tropical American Birds. (Publications of the Nuttall Ornithological Club No.10). Harvard University: Cambridge. BHL
- 1973 – The Life of the Hummingbird. Crown Publishers: New York. ISBN 0-517-50572-X. Internet Archive, registration required
- 1976 – Parent Birds and Their Young. (Corrie Herring Hooks series, No.2). University of Texas Press: Austin. ISBN 0-292-76424-3
- 1977 – A Bird Watcher's Adventures in Tropical America. (Corrie Herring Hooks series, No.3). University of Texas Press: Austin. ISBN 0-292-70722-3
- 1979 – The Imperative Call: A Naturalist's Quest in Temperate and Tropical America. University of Florida Press: Gainesville. ISBN 0-8130-0579-5
- 1980 – A Naturalist on a Tropical Farm. (Illustrated by Dana Gardner). University of California Press. ISBN 0-520-03802-9. Internet Archive, registration required
- 1981 – New Studies of Tropical American Birds. (Illustrated by Dana Gardner). (Publications of the Nuttall Ornithological Club No.19). Harvard University: Cambridge. ISBN 1-877973-29-7. BHL
- 1983 – Birds of Tropical America. (Illustrated by Dana Gardner). (Corrie Herring Hooks series, No.5). University of Texas Press: Austin. ISBN 0-292-74634-2
- 1984 – Aves De Costa Rica. (Illustrated by John S. Dunning). Editorial Costa Rica: San Jose. ISBN 9977-23-108-7
- 1984 – Nature Through Tropical Windows. University of California Press. ISBN 0-520-04745-1
- 1985 – La Finca De Un Naturalista. (Illustrated by Dana Gardner). Libro Libre: San Jose, Costa Rica. ISBN 9977-901-20-1
- 1985 – Life Ascending. University of Texas Press: Austin. ISBN 0-292-70374-0
- 1985 – Life of the Woodpecker. (Illustrated by Dana Gardner). Ibis Publishing: Santa Monica. ISBN 0-934797-00-5
- 1987 – Helpers at Birds' Nests: A Worldwide Survey of Cooperative Breeding and Related Behavior. (Illustrated by Dana Gardner). (1st edition). University Of Iowa Press. ISBN 0-87745-150-8. Internet Archive, registration required
- 1987 – A Naturalist Amid Tropical Splendor. (Illustrated by Dana Gardner). University of Iowa Press. ISBN 0-87745-163-X
- 1989 – A Guide to the Birds of Costa Rica. (With F. Gary Stiles. Illustrated by Dana Gardner). Comstock Publishing Associates/Cornell University Press: Ithaca. ISBN 0-8014-2287-6. Internet Archive, registration required
- 1989 – Birds Asleep. (Corrie Herring Hooks series, No.14). University of Texas Press: Austin. ISBN 0-292-70773-8. Internet Archive, registration required
- 1989 – Life of the Tanager. (Illustrated by Dana Gardner). Comstock Publishing: Ithaca. ISBN 0-8014-2226-4
- 1991 – Life of the Pigeon. (Illustrated by Dana Gardner). Comstock Publishing: Ithaca. ISBN 0-8014-2528-X
- 1992 – The Origins of Nature's Beauty. Essays. (Corrie Herring Hooks series). University of Texas Press: Austin. ISBN 0-292-76037-X
- 1996 – Antbirds and Ovenbirds: Their Lives and Homes. (Illustrated by Dana Gardner). University of Texas Press: Austin. ISBN 0-292-77705-1
- 1996 – Orioles, Blackbirds, and Their Kin: A Natural History. (Illustrated by Dana Gardner). University of Arizona Press. ISBN 0-8165-1601-4
- 1996 – The Minds of Birds. (Louise Lindsey Merrick Natural Environment Series, No.23). Texas A&M University Press: College Station. ISBN 0-89096-671-0
- 1997 – Life of the Flycatcher. (Illustrated by Dana Gardner). University of Oklahoma: Norman. ISBN 0-8061-2919-0
- 1999 – Helpers at Birds' Nests: A Worldwide Survey of Cooperative Breeding and Related Behavior. (Illustrated by Dana Gardner). (2nd expanded edition). University Of Iowa Press. ISBN 0-87745-674-7
- 1999 – Trogons, Laughing Falcons, and Other Neotropical Birds. (Louise Lindsey Merrick Natural Environment Series). Texas A&M University: College Station. ISBN 0-89096-850-0
- 2000 – Harmony and Conflict in the Living World. (Illustrated by Dana Gardner). University of Oklahoma Press: Norman. ISBN 0-8061-3231-0
- 2002 – Field Guide to the Wildlife of Costa Rica. (With Carrol L. Henderson and Steve Adams). (Corrie Herring Hooks series). University of Texas Press: Austin. ISBN 0-292-73459-X
- 2006 – Moral Foundations: An Introduction to Ethics. Axios Press. ISBN 0-9661908-9-0

== Skutch Award ==
After a joint meeting of the Association of Field Ornithologists, American Birding Association and Asociación Ornitológica de Costa Rica held in San Jose, Costa Rica, in 1997, Skutch made an endowment to the Association of Field Ornithologists to establish a research award. Officially The Pamela and Alexander F. Skutch Research Award, the award is usually referred to as the Skutch Awards. Skutch was honored at that meeting for over 60 years of contributions to ornithology.
