= George Junge =

Dutch ornithologist

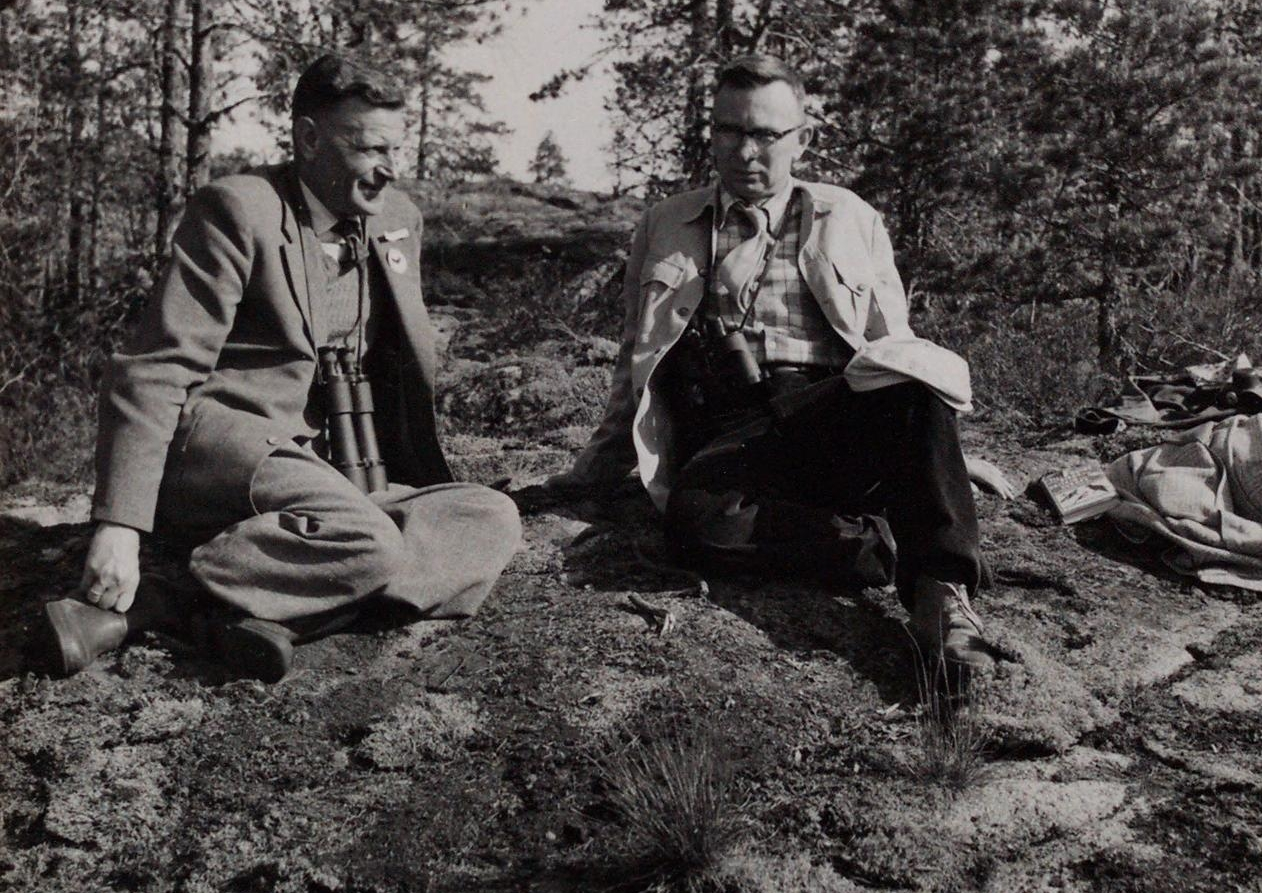
George Junge (left) with Dean Amadon in Vesterkulla, Finland, June 8, 1958.

George Christoffel Alexander Junge (7 August 1905 – 3 February 1962) was a Dutch ornithologist who was an expert on the birds of Southeast Asia, especially Indonesia, and New Guinea. He was born in Haarlem and studied zoology at the University of Amsterdam, obtaining a doctorate in 1934 with a thesis on crustacean anatomy. From 1928 he studied avian systematics at the Zoological Museum of Amsterdam. In 1934, he was appointed head of the ornithological department at the Rijksmuseum van Natuurlijke Historie in Leiden, a position he kept until his sudden and relatively early death at the age of 56.
