= Stuart Keith =

English-American ornithologist

- Born: 4 September 1931; Clothall, Hertfordshire, England
- Died: 13 February 2003 (aged 71); Chuuk, Micronesia
- Citizenship: American
- Education: Worcester College
- Known for: The Birds of Africa
- Scientific career
- Fields: Ornithology
- Workplaces: American Museum of Natural History

George Stuart Keith (4 September 1931 – 13 February 2003) was an English and American ornithologist. He was a champion birder, editor of a series of books about African birds, and co-founder of the American Birding Association (ABA).

== Early life ==
Keith was born on 4 September 1931 in Clothall, near Baldock in Hertfordshire, England. During World War II, he moved with his mother and three siblings to Toronto, Ontario. In 1943, he returned to England to study classics at Marlborough College. During the Korean War he served as a lieutenant in The King's Own Scottish Borderers, an infantry regiment. After his service, Keith completed his formal education, receiving an M.A. degree in classics from Worcester College of the University of Oxford.

== Career ==
He returned to North America in 1955. From 1958, he was a research associate in the ornithology department of the American Museum of Natural History in New York. He joined the American Ornithologists' Union in 1959; became an elective member in 1970; and was made a fellow in 1991. From 1965 to 1973, he served as secretary, then president, of the U.S. Section of the International Council for Bird Preservation, now BirdLife International. In 1969, he helped found the ABA, and he served as its first president, from 1973 to 1976.

In 1978, Keith joined the project that would compile the seven-volume series The Birds of Africa as a member of its Board of Advisors. In 1980, he became a senior editor, sharing duties with Hilary Fry and Emil K. Urban. He contributed the sections describing bulbuls and cisticolas, and had completed his work on the final volume (published in 2004) at the time of his death.

With John Gooders, in 1980 he published the Collins Bird Guide to the birds of Britain and Europe.

Keith made contributions in other media as well. In the 1960s, he produced a film about cranes in Japan; he produced a feature-length film on African birds. He made recordings of bird songs from Madagascar and continental Africa; with William Gunn, he produced Birds of the African Rain Forests, the first recordings to specialize in the vocalizations of 90 species of African forest birds.

It is for his accomplishments as a birder that Keith is most widely known. In 1956, he set a one-year record of 594 species seen in the United States and Canada. He was the first to see 4,000 species worldwide, a total which he achieved in the 1970s. At the time of his death, he had seen more than 6,500 species; however, he was surpassed by Phoebe Snetsinger, who is credited with almost 8,400 species. Keith's feats were recorded in The Wall Street Journal, People, The New Yorker, and Bird Watcher's Digest.

== Recognition ==
In 1993 he was awarded the Linnaean Society of New York's Eisenmann Medal. In 1999, he received the Ludlow Griscom Award from the ABA "in appreciation of his vision and leadership in shaping ABA and tireless passion and dedication to the birds of North America."

== Later life and death ==
Keith became a naturalized American citizen in 1994. He died, of circulatory-related causes, on 13 February 2003 while on a birding trip to Chuuk in Micronesia, having seen a new life bird earlier in the day.

== Selected publications ==
- Keith, Stuart and John Gooders. 1980. Collins Bird Guide: A Photographic Guide to the Birds of Britain and Europe. Collins, London, UK. 767 pp. ISBN 978-0002191197.
- Urban, Emil K.; C. Hilary Fry; and Stuart Keith. 1986. The Birds of Africa, Volume II: Game Birds to Pigeons. Academic Press, London, UK. 552 pp. ISBN 9780121373023.
- Fry, C. Hilary; Stuart Keith; and Emil K. Urban. 1988. The Birds of Africa, Volume III: Parrots to Woodpeckers. Academic Press, London, UK. 611 pp. ISBN 9780121373030.
- Keith, Stuart; Emil K. Urban; and C. Hilary Fry. 1992. The Birds of Africa, Volume IV: Broadbills to Chats. Academic Press, London, UK. 632 pp. ISBN 9780121373047.
- Urban, Emil K.; C. Hilary Fry; and Stuart Keith. 1997. The Birds of Africa, Volume V: Thrushes to Puffback Flycatchers. Academic Press, London, UK. 672 pp. ISBN 9780121373054.
- Fry, C. Hilary; Stuart Keith; and Emil K. Urban. 2000. The Birds of Africa, Volume VI: Picathartes to Oxpeckers. Academic Press, London, UK. 600 pp. ISBN 9780121373061.
- Fry, C. Hilary and Stuart Keith. 2004. The Birds of Africa, Volume VII: Sparrows to Buntings. Princeton University Press, Princeton, NJ. 728 pp. ISBN 9780691119526.
