= Arthur B. Singer =

American painter

- Born: December 4, 1917; New York, United States
- Died: April 7, 1990 (aged 72); Jericho, New York, United States
- Occupation: wildlife illustrator

Arthur Bernard Singer (4 December 1917 – 7 April 1990) was an American wildlife artist who primarily specialized in bird illustration.

== Early life and education ==
Singer was born on 4 December 1917 in New York City, to a family of artists, the son of Tessie (Kirshbaum) and Sigmund Singer, and was raised in mid-Manhattan. In the 1930s he made friends with several jazz musicians active in Harlem, including Duke Ellington and Cab Calloway, both of whom he sketched during this period. This friendship lasted a lifetime, and in 1950s Ellington asked Singer to design a number of album covers, including a design that became the album cover for In a Mellow Tone.

In 1939, he graduated from Cooper Union and subsequently he worked as a printer in an advertising agency. In 1942, while still in his early twenties, he was offered the opportunity of an exhibit of his animal illustration work by the New York Zoological Society. Shortly thereafter, he was drafted into the US Army and served in Company C of the 603rd Camouflage Engineers, which was part of the Ghost Army.

== Career ==
Influenced by Carl Rungius, Louis Agassiz Fuertes, and Wilhelm Kuhnert, Singer became a full-time illustrator and artist by 1955. An assignment from The American Home magazine in 1956 cleared the path for him as a wildlife artist for the rest of his life. In the following years, Singer illustrated more than 20 books, including Field Guide to Birds of North America (by Bertel Bruun and Chandler S. Robbins), Field Guide to Birds of Europe, Birds of the World (by Oliver L. Austin), The Life of the Hummingbird, Field Guide to Birds of the West Indies (by James Bond and Don R. Eckelberry), State Birds( Arthur and Alan Singer ), Zoo Animals, Birds of Greenland, Cats, Wild Animals from Alligator to Zebra, British and European Birds in Colour (by Bertel Bruun), The Hamlyn Guide to Birds of Britain and Europe, Book of Birds in Colour (by Robert Porter Allen), Water and Marsh Birds of the World (by Oliver L. Austin) and Birds of the Caribbean. In the 1970s he received several commissions for illustrations by Audubon and National Geographic. The US Postal Service asked Singer to illustrate a set of fifty official state bird and flower stamps in 1982 which he designed and illustrated with his son Alan —a series that became highly popular in the US, selling 500 million sheets and over 25 billion individual stamps.

Singer was the first recipient of the Augustus St. Gaudus medal (1962) and was a fellow of the American Ornithologists Union. He received a Citation of Merit by the Society of Illustrators in 1974, and in 1977 he earned a silver medal at the International Book Fair in Leipzig, Germany, for Birds of the World. In 1985, he received the Hal Borland Award from the National Audubon Society upon the 200th anniversary of Audubon's birth. He died of esophageal cancer in his home in Jericho, New York on 7 April 1990.
