= Frank Gill (ornithologist) =

American ornithologist

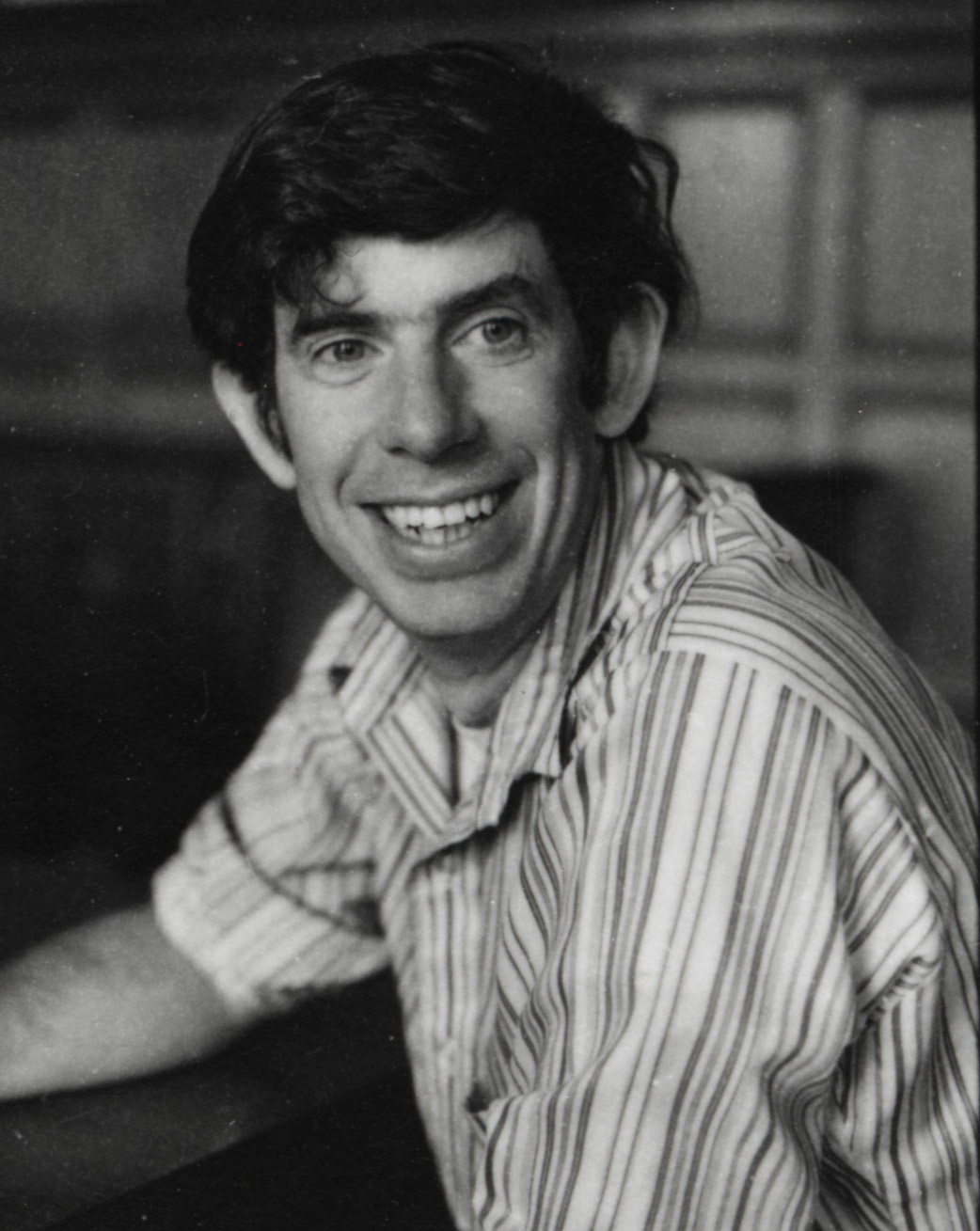
- Frank Gill, 1974
- Born: Frank Bennington Gill; October 2, 1941 (age 84); New York City, New York, United States
- Occupation: Ornithologist

Frank Bennington Gill (born October 2, 1941) is an American ornithologist with worldwide research interests and birding experience. He is perhaps best known as the author of the textbook Ornithology (4th edition, 2019), the leading textbook in the field.

Gill was born in New York City and raised in Teaneck, New Jersey. He reported that he became interested in birds at the age of seven, when his grandfather, Frank Rockingham Downing, showed him a song sparrow at a birdbath. This was the first time he had seen a bird through binoculars, "and I was hooked."

After Gill received his PhD in zoology from the University of Michigan in 1969 (where he had also completed his undergraduate degree), he joined the ornithology department at the Academy of Natural Sciences in Philadelphia. From 1969 to 1995, Gill was a full-time staff member of the academy, where he held various positions throughout his tenure, including that of chairman for the Department of Ornithology and vice president for systematics and evolutionary biology. During his time at the academy, Gill was instrumental in re-establishing the academy's position as one of the leading centers of American ornithological research. This was manifested through Gill's work as the founding director of the VIREO program (Visual Resources for Ornithology) and his work as the editor of the encyclopedic series Birds of North America, Life Histories for the 21st Century. In 1988 he was awarded the Linnaean Society of New York's Eisenmann Medal. Since 1996, Gill has been affiliated with the academy as a research fellow.

More recently, Gill was the president of the American Ornithologists' Union from 1998 to 2000. Besides his acclaimed textbook, Gill's published works include over 150 scientific and popular articles. His worldwide research programs included field studies of island birds, hybridization by blue-winged and golden-winged warblers, flower-feeding strategies of sunbirds of Africa and of hermit hummingbirds of Middle America, and phylogeny through DNA of the chickadees of the world. For his contributions to ornithology, Gill was recognized with the William Brewster Award, the highest honor bestowed by the AOU. Additionally, Gill is an elected member of the International Ornithological Congress, as well as the co-author, with Minturn Wright, of Birds of the World: Recommended English Names (2006). Since 1994, he has led the international effort to use a consistent set of unique English names and authoritative species taxonomy of the birds of the world.

Gill's contributions include innovative program leadership combined with a personal commitment to engaging the public in ornithology through citizen science. He pioneered “cyberbirding”—the use of the internet for nationwide citizen science initiatives—including the conversion of classic Christmas Bird Count to modern technology. Frank and his colleagues at the Cornell Lab of Ornithology also were awarded US Patent No. 6,772,142 for their internet software application to translate online georeference data to an interactive database. With such tools, he and his colleagues created the Great Backyard Bird Count and then the eBird initiative of Audubon and the Cornell Lab of Ornithology.

In 1996, Gill became senior vice president and director of science for the National Audubon Society, a position from which he retired in 2004. At Audubon, he championed the nationwide Important Bird Areas initiative in partnership with BirdLife International. In 2007, he was elected to the board of directors of the National Audubon Society and served as interim president and CEO (2010). He has been quoted in a number of news reports concerning birds.

== Literature ==
- William Edwin Davis, Jerome A. Jackson: Contributions to the History of North American Ornithology, Nuttall Ornithological Club, 1995. p. 21, ISBN 978-1-877973-36-9
