= Roger Tory Peterson Award =

The ABA Roger Tory Peterson Award for Promoting the Cause of Birding is an award given by the American Birding Association to an individual who, over the course of a lifetime, has advanced the cause of birding.

One of five awards presented by the ABA for contributions to ornithology, the award is named in honor of Roger Tory Peterson. As author, artist, and educator, Peterson "furthered the study, appreciation and protection of birds the world over," was nominated for the Nobel Peace Prize, and served as one of the inspirations for the 20th century environmental movement.

The award was first bestowed on Arnold Small.

== List of recipients ==
The award was introduced in 2000.

Year	Name	Notes
2000	Arnold Small	Past ABA president
2001	Pete Dunne	
2002	David Allen Sibley	
2004	Victor Emanuel	
2008	Kenn Kaufman	
2009	John Rowlett	
2012	Jon L. Dunn	
2013	Noble Proctor	
2014	Laura Erickson	
2015	Chandler Robbins	ABA also grants the Chandler Robbins Award for Education/Conservation
2017	Scott Weidensaul	Presented to Mr. Weidensaul on September 30, 2017 at the American Birding Expo outside Philadelphia, PA.
2019	Bill Thompson III	
2022	JB Brumfield	
2022	J. Drew Lanham	
2024	Peter Kaestner	
2024	Tom Johnson	

== See also ==
- List of ornithology awards
