= Guy Tudor =

American ornithologist and artist (1934–2026)

Guy Tudor (September 28, 1934 – July 14, 2026) was an American ornithologist, naturalist and artist.

== Life and career ==
Tudor was the son of Charles William and Anna Margaret Tudor, née Matthews. His father was artistic director of Life magazine from 1949 to 1962. After studies at Princeton University from 1952 to 1954 and at Yale University from 1954 to 1955, Guy Tudor served in the United States Army from 1958 to 1960. Tudor was a self-taught artist who, through his ornithological and illustrative work, helped to preserve nature and the diversity of birdlife.

He created field guide illustrations that depict a large part of the neotropical avifauna. His studies came from a combination of field notes, direct observation, photographs, and museum collections of bird species. He directed, organized, and helped illustrate the plates for a number of field guides to the Neotropics, including A Guide to the Birds of Venezuela (1978, with Rodolphe Meyer de Schauensee and William Henry Phelps) and A Guide to the Birds of Colombia (1986). These guides, valued not only for their illustrations but also for their eloquent advocacy for the conservation of nature, are recognized as scientific works for research ecologists.

Tudor worked as an illustrator on The Birds of South America, a four-volume standard work produced in collaboration with Robert S. Ridgely was created. The first volume, Oscine Passerines, was published in 1989, and the second volume, Suboscine Passerines, in 1994. The book Birds of Venezuela was published in 2002 (with Steven Leon Hilty and John A. Gwynne) and in 2005 the work Butterflies of the East Coast: An Observer's Guide. In 2010, in collaboration with John A. Gwynne, Robert S. Ridgely, and the Wildlife Conservation Society the book Birds of Brazil: The Pantanal & Cerrado of Central Brazil and in 2016 the sequel volume Birds of Brazil: The Atlantic forest of southeast Brazil, including São Paulo & Rio de Janeiro.

He was president of the New York City Butterfly Club, an organization he co-founded in 1984, and he was director of the North American Butterfly Association.

In 1990, Tudor was awarded a MacArthur Fellowship for graphic design, illustration and species conservation. In 1995 he received the Eisenmann Medal from the Linnaean Society of New York (LSNY).

Tudor died on July 14, 2026, at the age of 91.
