= Kenn Kaufman =

American naturalist, author, artist and conservationist

- Born: 1954 (age 71–72); South Bend, Indiana, U.S.
- Occupations: Author; Artist; Naturalist; Conservationist
- Awards: Ludlow Griscom Award; Roger Tory Peterson Award
- Website: birdingwithkennandkim.blogspot.com

Kenn Kaufman (born 1954) is an American author, artist, naturalist, and conservationist, known for his work on several popular field guides of birds and butterflies in North America.

Born in South Bend, Indiana, Kaufman began birding at the age of six. When he was nine, his family moved to Wichita, Kansas, where his fascination with birds intensified. At age sixteen, inspired by birding pioneers such as Roger Tory Peterson, he dropped out of high school and began hitchhiking around North America in pursuit of birds. Three years later, in 1973, he set the record for the most North American bird species seen in one year (671) while participating in a Big Year, a year-long birding competition. His record included regions like Baja California that are no longer ornithologically considered part of North America, and his record has since been surpassed. His cross-country birding journey, covering some eighty thousand miles, was eventually recorded in a memoir, Kingbird Highway.

Subsequently, he focused his work on creating and expanding upon birding field guides. In 1992, he was given the Ludlow Griscom Award by the American Birding Association. Kaufman also received the ABA Roger Tory Peterson Award in 2008 for a "lifetime of achievements in promoting the cause of birding."

Kaufman resides in Oak Harbor, Ohio with his wife Kimberly. Kenn writes for Birds and Blooms, Bird Watcher's Digest, and works/volunteers at the Black Swamp Bird Observatory. Kaufman maintains a blog where he reports bird sightings in the northwest region of Ohio and makes predictions about the spring bird migration.

== Works ==
- Kaufman Focus Guides: Field Guide to Nature of New England (with Kimberly Kaufman) ISBN 978-0618456970
- Kaufman Focus Guides: Birds of North America ISBN 978-0618574230
- Kaufman Focus Guides: Butterflies of North America (with Jim P. Brock) ISBN 978-0618768264
- Kaufman Focus Guides: Mammals of North America (with Rick Bowers and Nora Bowers) ISBN 978-0618951888
- Kaufman Focus Guides: Insects of North America (with Eric R. Eaton) ISBN 978-0618153107
- Lives of North American Birds (1996) ISBN 978-0618159888
- Kingbird Highway (1997) ISBN 978-0618709403
- Kaufman Field Guide to Advanced Birding ISBN 978-0547248325
- Flights Against the Sunset: Stories that Reunited a Mother and Son (2008) ISBN 978-0618942701
- A Season on the Wind: Inside the World of Spring Migration (2019) ISBN 978-1328566423
- The Birds That Audubon Missed: Discovery and Desire in the American Wilderness. Avid Reader Press, 2024. ISBN 978-1668007594
