= SS Charles D. Walcott =

Liberty ship of WWII

History

United States
- Name: Charles D. Walcott
- Namesake: Charles D. Walcott
- Owner: War Shipping Administration (WSA)
- Operator: American Export Lines Inc.
- Ordered: as type (EC2-S-C1) hull, MC hull 2327
- Builder: J.A. Jones Construction, Panama City, Florida
- Cost: $940,965
- Yard number: 68
- Way number: 1
- Laid down: 29 September 1944
- Launched: 7 November 1944
- Sponsored by: Miss Eva Pearl Parker
- Completed: 18 November 1944
- Identification: Call sign: KYUJ
- Fate: Placed in the National Defense Reserve Fleet, Wilmington, North Carolina, 30 December 1947; Sold for scrapping, 31 January 1961, withdrawn from the fleet, 26 July 1961

General characteristics
- Class & type: Liberty ship; type EC2-S-C1, standard
- Tonnage: 10,865 LT DWT; 7,176 GRT
- Displacement: 3,380 long tons (3,434 t) (light); 14,245 long tons (14,474 t) (max)
- Length: 441 feet 6 inches (135 m) oa; 416 feet (127 m) pp; 427 feet (130 m) lwl
- Beam: 57 feet (17 m)
- Draft: 27 ft 9.25 in (8.4646 m)
- Installed power: 2 × Oil fired 450 °F (232 °C) boilers, operating at 220 psi (1,500 kPa); 2,500 hp (1,900 kW)
- Propulsion: 1 × triple-expansion steam engine, (manufactured by Filer and Stowell, Milwaukee, Wisconsin); 1 × screw propeller
- Speed: 11.5 knots (21.3 km/h; 13.2 mph)
- Capacity: 562,608 cubic feet (15,931 m^{3}) (grain); 499,573 cubic feet (14,146 m^{3}) (bale)
- Complement: 38–62 USMM; 21–40 USNAG
- Armament: Varied by ship; Bow-mounted 3-inch (76 mm)/50-caliber gun; Stern-mounted 4-inch (102 mm)/50-caliber gun; 2–8 × single 20-millimeter (0.79 in) Oerlikon anti-aircraft (AA) cannons and/or, 2–8 × 37-millimeter (1.46 in) M1 AA guns

SS Charles D. Walcott was a Liberty ship built in the United States during World War II. She was named after Charles D. Walcott, an American geologist, paleontologist, and government administrator. Walcott served as the director of the US Geological Survey from 1894 to 1907, and as secretary of the Smithsonian Institution from 1907 to 1921.

== Construction ==
Charles D. Walcott was laid down on 29 September 1944, under a Maritime Commission (MARCOM) contract, MC hull 2327, by J.A. Jones Construction, Panama City, Florida; sponsored by Miss Eva Pearl Parker, a yard employee in the fabrication shop, and launched on 7 November 1944.

== History ==
She was allocated to American Export Lines Inc., 13 November 1944. On 30 December 1947, she was placed in the National Defense Reserve Fleet, in Wilmington, North Carolina.

She was sold for scrapping, 31 January 1961, to Commercial Metals Co., for $46,588.18. She was withdrawn from the fleet, 26 July 1961.

== Bibliography ==
- "Jones Construction, Panama City FL". www.ShipbuildingHistory.com. 13 October 2010.
- Maritime Administration. "Charles D. Walcott". Ship History Database Vessel Status Card. U.S. Department of Transportation, Maritime Administration. This article incorporates text from this source, which is in the public domain.
- Davies, James (May 2004). "Specifications (As-Built)" (PDF). p. 23.
- "SS Charles D. Walcott".
