= Birding (magazine) =

American Birding Association's bimonthly magazine

- Discipline: Ornithology
- Language: English
- Edited by: Ted Floyd, Frank Izaguirre

Publication details
- History: 1969–present
- Publisher: American Birding Association (United States)
- Frequency: Bimonthly

Standard abbreviations
- ISO 4: Birding

Links
- Journal homepage

Birding is the bimonthly magazine of the American Birding Association. Birding publishes articles on field identification, bird conservation, notable sightings, and other subjects of interest to the birding community. Each issue also includes critical reviews of new equipment and books. Ted Floyd and Frank Izaguirre are the magazine's editors.

In 2006, a six-part history of birding in North America was published across the six issues of Birding.

- The History of Birding Part I. 1968–1974 Birding (Jan/Feb 2006): pp. 20–21.
- The History of Birding Part II. 1975–1980 Birding (Mar/Apr 2006): pp. 20–21.
- The History of Birding Part III. 1981–1987 Birding (May/Jun 2006): pp. 18–19.
- The History of Birding Part IV. 1988–1993 Birding (Jul/Aug 2006): pp. 18–19.
- The History of Birding Part V. 1994–2000 Birding (Sep/Oct 2006): pp. 18–19.
- The History of Birding Part VI. 2001–2006 Birding (Nov/Dec 2006): pp. 18–19.

== See also ==
- List of ornithology journals
