= Charles Walcott (ethologist) =

Charles Walcott (born 1934) is an ethologist and Professor Emeritus at Cornell University. He studied how spiders catch prey, as well as how pigeons home.

== Early life and education ==
Walcott obtained his A.B. in biology in 1956 and his Ph.D. in zoology from Cornell in 1959.

== Career ==
He worked as an assistant professor at Harvard from 1961 to 1965 and then at Tufts until 1967 and at SUNY Stony Brook until 1981. He then returned to Cornell as full professor, staying until his retirement in 2016. In this period he was the director (later Louis Agassiz Fuertes Director) of the Cornell Lab of Ornithology from 1981-1995, succeeded by John W. Fitzpatrick, and served as Dean of Faculty from 2003 to 2008 and as University Ombudsman. He was elected as a fellow to the American Association for the Advancement of Science (AAAS) in 2018.

He also worked as a producer of nature TV shows for children for WGBH.
