= C. Stuart Houston =

Canadian physician, radiologist, ornithologist, and writer (1927–2021)

Stuart Houston
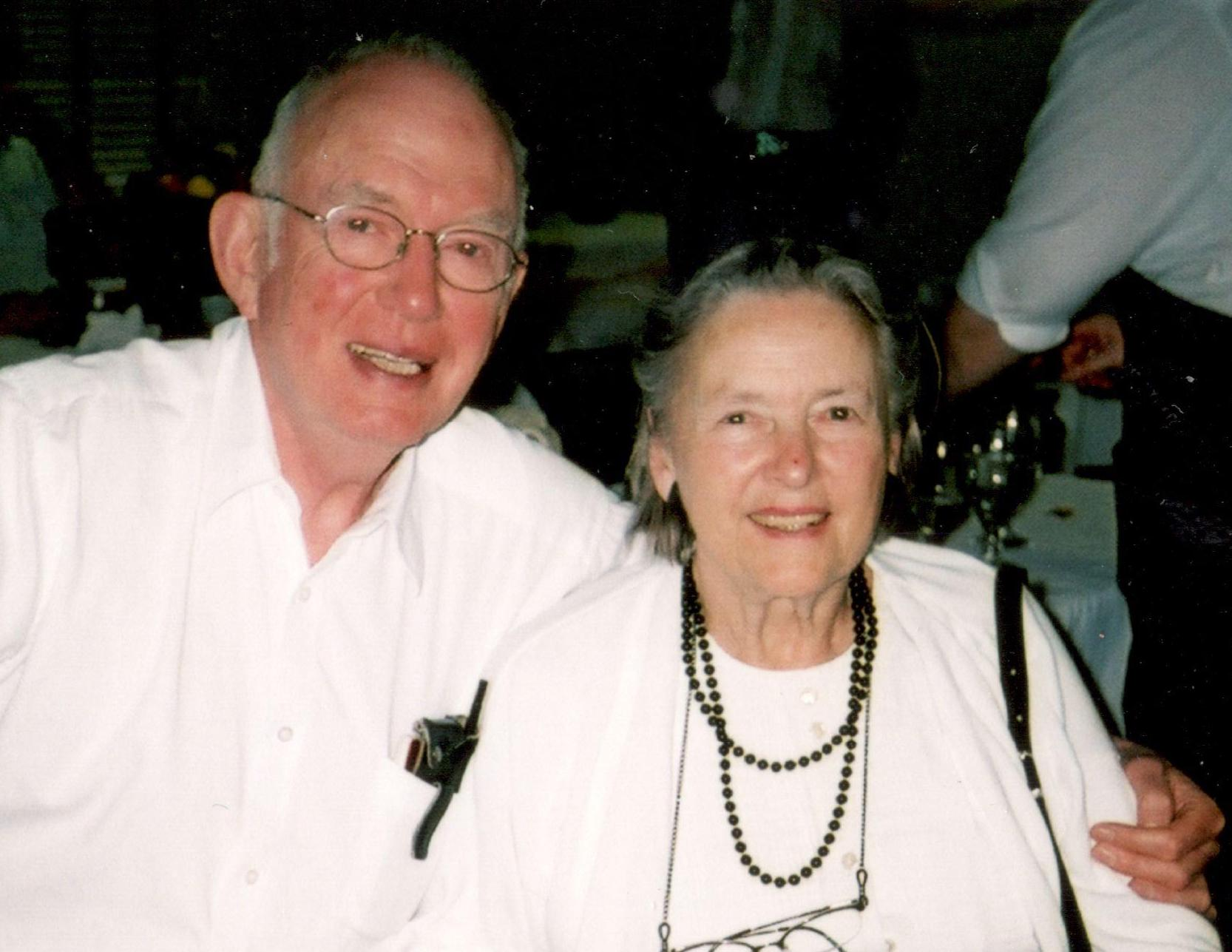
- Stuart and Mary Houston
- Born: Clarence Stuart Houston; September 26, 1927; Williston, North Dakota, U.S.
- Died: July 22, 2021 (aged 93); Saskatoon, Saskatchewan, Canada
- Education: University of Manitoba, Saskatoon Royal University Hospital, Boston Children's Hospital
- Awards: Gold Medal from the Canadian Association of Radiologists, 1997; Order of Canada, 1993.
- Scientific career
- Fields: Medicine, Ornithology, Historian
- Workplaces: University of Saskatchewan

C. Stuart Houston (September 26, 1927 – July 22, 2021) was an American-born Canadian physician, professor emeritus of medicine in radiology, award-winning ornithologist, historian, and writer. He was awarded the 1990 Eisenmann Medal and was made an officer of the Order of Canada in 1993.

== Biography ==
Houston's parents Clarence J. Houston and Sigridur (Sigga) Christianson Houston jointly operated a general medical practice in Watford City, North Dakota. In 1928 the family moved to Yorkton, Saskatchewan, where Houston's parents started another medical practice. He was born in Williston, North Dakota and after completing his secondary education at the Yorkton Collegiate Institute, Houston earned his bachelor's degree at the University of Manitoba and graduated there with an M.D. in 1951. In 1951 he married Mary Isabel Belcher and the two moved to Yorkton, where he joined his parents' medical practice. He practised medicine from 1951 to 1955 in Yorkton, studied internal medicine and pediatrics for the academic year 1955–1956 at Saskatoon's Royal University Hospital, and practiced from 1956 to 1960 again in Yorkton.

In 1960, Houston moved with his family to Saskatoon where he began training in diagnostic radiology at Saskatoon's Royal University Hospital. With the support of a George Von L. Meyer Memorial Scholarship, he later studied for a year in affiliation with Harvard Medical School at Children's Hospital Boston. He joined in 1964 the department of diagnostic radiology at the University of Saskatchewan, where he became a professor in 1969 and retired in 1996 as professor emeritus. He was head of the department of medical imaging from July 1982 to June 1987.

Houston and his wife Mary banded about 155,000 different birds from about 200 different species. They made about 3,100 recoveries. He also holds records for the most bandings of turkey vultures and great horned owls. Mary Houston banded 5,385 Bohemian waxwings, which in 2017 was more than the next three competitors combined. Houston and Farley Mowat once worked together banding birds and Mowat sent him a field guide.

Houston is the author or coauthor of more than 250 articles in medicine or the history of medicine. He wrote three chapters for the book Pediatric Skeletal Radiology (1991). He is the author or coauthor of over 500 publications in ornithology or natural history. He edited three books about the Franklin expedition, based on the diaries and paintings of midshipmen George Back and Robert Hood (who died on the Coppermine expedition), and naturalist John Richardson. Stuart is the author or coauthor of several other books, including Birds of Saskatchewan (2020). His wife Mary would often improve his prose after he wrote a first draft of the facts.

Stuart and Mary Houston had three sons and a daughter.

== Selected publications ==
=== Articles on history of medicine ===
- Houston, C. S. (1978). "The early years of the Saskatchewan Medical Quarterly". Canadian Medical Association Journal. 118 (9): 1122–1128. PMC 1818698. PMID 348291.
- Houston, C. J.; Houston, C. S. (1978). "Pioneer of vision: The medical and political memoirs of T. A. Patrick, MD". Canadian Medical Association Journal. 119 (8): 964–967. PMC 1819130. PMID 367556.
- Houston, C. S. (1984). "New light on Dr. John Richardson". Canadian Medical Association Journal. 131 (6): 653–660. PMC 1483632. PMID 6383590.
- Houston, C. S.; Fedoruk, S. O. (1985). "Saskatchewan's role in radiotherapy research". Canadian Medical Association Journal. 132 (7): 854–864. PMC 1345880. PMID 3884123.
- Houston, C. S. (1989). "Life in Yorkton before medicare came along". Canadian Medical Association Journal. 140 (10): 1199–1202. PMC 1269079.
- Houston, C. S. (1990). "Dare Saskatchewan close its one-doctor hospitals?". Canadian Medical Association Journal. 142 (5): 467–468. PMC 1451657.
- Houston, C. Stuart (1990). "Scurvy and Canadian exploration". Canadian Bulletin of Medical History. 7 (2): 161–167. doi:10.3138/cbmh.7.2.161. PMID 11622549.
- McIntyre, John W.R.; Houston, C. Stuart (1999). "Smallpox and its control in Canada". Canadian Medical Association Journal. 161 (12): 1543–1547. PMC 1230874. PMID 10624414.

=== Articles on medicine ===
- Houston, C. Stuart; Wittenborg, M. H. (1965). "Roentgen Evaluation of Anomalies of Rotation and Fixation of the Bowel in Children". Radiology. 84: 1–18. doi:10.1148/84.1.1. PMID 14252897.
- Zaleski, W. A.; Houston, C. S.; Pozsonyi, J.; Ying, K. L. (1966). "The XXXXY Chromosome Anomaly: Report of Three New Cases and Review of 30 Cases from the Literature". Canadian Medical Association Journal. 94 (22): 1143–1154. PMC 1935479. PMID 4222822.
- Buchan, D. J.; Houston, C. S. (1965). "Small Bowel Ulceration Associated with Enteric-Coated Potassium Chloride and Hydrochlorothiazide". Canadian Medical Association Journal. 92 (4): 176–179. PMC 1927727. PMID 14232192.
- Zaleski, W. A.; Houston, C. S.; Pozsonyi, J.; Ying, K. L. (1966). "The XXXXY Chromosome Anomaly: Report of Three New Cases and Review of 30 Cases from the Literature". Canadian Medical Association Journal. 94 (22): 1143–1154. PMC 1935479. PMID 4222822.
- Houston, C. Stuart; Zaleski, Witold A. (1967). "The Shape of Vertebral Bodies and Femoral Necks in Relation to Activity". Radiology. 89 (1): 59–66. doi:10.1148/89.1.59. PMID 4961176.
- Houston, C. S. (1977). "Diagnostic irradiation of women during the reproductive period". Canadian Medical Association Journal. 117 (6): 648–651. PMC 1879844. PMID 902213.
- Dixon, Brian L.; Stuart Houston, C. (1978). "Fatal Neonatal Pulmonary Candidiasis". Radiology. 129 (1): 132. doi:10.1148/129.1.132. PMID 693863.
- Houston, C. S.; Weiler, R. L.; Habbick, B. F. (1979). "Severity of lung disease in Indian children". Canadian Medical Association Journal. 120 (9): 1116–1121. PMC 1819297. PMID 445307.
- Houston, C. Stuart; Opitz, John M.; Spranger, Jürgen W.; MacPherson, Roderick I.; Reed, Martin H.; Gilbert, Enid F.; Herrmann, Jürgen; Schinzel, Albert (1983). "The campomelic syndrome: Review, report of 17 cases, and follow-up on the currently 17-year-old boy first reported by Maroteaux et al in 1971". American Journal of Medical Genetics. 15 (1): 3–28. doi:10.1002/ajmg.1320150103. PMID 6344634.
- Martin, A. D.; Houston, C. S. (1987). "Osteoporosis, calcium and physical activity". Canadian Medical Association Journal. 136 (6): 587–593. PMC 1491904. PMID 3545420.

=== Articles on ornithology ===
- Houston, C. S.; Bechard, M. J. (1982). "Oology on the Northern Plains: An Historical Review". Blue Jay. 40 (3): 154–157. doi:10.29173/bluejay4697. ISSN 2562-5667.
- Houston, C. Stuart (1983). "John Richardson (1787–1865)". Arctic. 36 (4). doi:10.14430/arctic2296.
- Kehoe, F. Patrick; Brown, P. W.; Houston, C. Stuart (1989). "Survival and Longevity of White-Winged Scoters Nesting in Central Saskatchewan (Sobrevivencia y Longevidad de Individuos de Melanitta fusca anidando en Saskatchewan)". Journal of Field Ornithology. 60 (2): 133–136. JSTOR 4513411.
- Houston, C. Stuart; Fox, Glen A.; Crawford, Roy D. (1991). "Unhatched Eggs in Swainson's Hawk Nests (Huevos sin eclosionar en nidos de Buteo swainsoni)". Journal of Field Ornithology. 62 (4): 479–485. JSTOR 20065827.
- Reeves, Henry M.; Houston, C. Stuart (2007). "Once upon a Time in American Ornithology". The Wilson Journal of Ornithology. 119 (3): 511–513. doi:10.1676/1559-4491(2007)119[511:OUATIA]2.0.CO;2. JSTOR 20456046.
- Houston, C. Stuart; Jaksic, Fabian M.; Nelson, E. Charles (2011). "Jack Goodall (1892–1980), ornithologist and artist of "Las aves de Chile": Some biographical notes" (PDF). Revista Chilena de Historia Natural. 84 (3): 461–463. Bibcode:2011RvCHN..84..461H. doi:10.4067/S0716-078X2011000300012.
- Houston, C. Stuart; McLoughlin, Philip D.; Mandel, James T.; Bechard, Marc J.; Stoffel, Marten J.; Barber, David R.; Bildstein, Keith L. (2011). "Breeding Home Ranges of Migratory Turkey Vultures Near Their Northern Limit". The Wilson Journal of Ornithology. 123 (3): 472–478. doi:10.1676/10-090.1. ISSN 1559-4491. S2CID 11855371.

=== Books ===
- Houston, C. Stuart; Street, Maurice George (1959). The Birds of the Saskatchewan River: Carlton to Cumberland. Vol. 2. Regina: Saskatchewan Natural History Society.
- Houston, C. Stuart, ed. (1974). To the Arctic by Canoe 1819-1821: The Journal and Paintings of Robert Hood, Midshipman with Franklin. McGill-Queens University Press. ISBN 0-7735-1222-5.
  - Houston, Stuart (26 October 1994). 1994 pbk reprint. McGill-Queen's Press - MQUP. ISBN 978-0-7735-6491-6.
- Houston, C. J.; Houston, C. Stuart (1980). Pioneer of vision: The reminiscences of T. A. Patrick, M.D. Saskatoon: Western Producer Prairie Books.
- Houston, C. Stuart, ed. (1984). Arctic Ordeal: The Journal of John Richardson, Surgeon-Naturalist with Franklin, 1820-1822. McGill-Queens University Press. ISBN 0-7735-0418-4.
  - Houston, Stuart (October 1984). 1984 pbk edition. McGill-Queen's Press - MQUP. ISBN 978-0-7735-6492-3.
- Houston, C. Stuart, ed. (1994). Arctic Artist: The Journal and Paintings of George Back, Midshipman with Franklin, 1819-1822. McGill-Queens University Press. ISBN 0-7735-1181-4.
- Houston, C. Stuart (2002). Steps on the road to medicare: why Saskatchewan led the way. McGill-Queen's University Press. ISBN 0-7735-2550-5.
  - with Merle Massie: Stuart Houston, C.; Massie, Merle (October 2013). 36 Steps on the Road to Medicare: How Saskatchewan Led the Way (revised ed.). McGill-Queen's Press - MQUP. ISBN 978-0-7735-8958-2.
- Houston, Stuart; Ball, Tim; Houston, Mary (2003). Eighteenth-Century Naturalists of Hudson Bay. McGill-Queens University Press. ISBN 978-0-7735-6975-1.
- Houston, C. Stuart; Waiser, Bill (2010). Tommy's team: the people behind the Douglas years. Markham, Ontario: Fifth House.
- Smith, Alan R.; Houston, C. Stuart; Roy, J. Frank, eds. (2019). Birds of Saskatchewan. Regina: Nature Saskatchewan. ISBN 978-0-921104-34-6. (Birds of Saskatchewan is one of five books shortlisted as nominees for the 2020 Regina Public Library Book of the Year Award.)
