= Harold F. Mayfield =

American business executive and amateur ornithologist

Harold Ford Mayfield (25 March 1911 – 27 January 2007) was an American business executive and amateur ornithologist who made a major study of Kirtland's warbler and worked for the preservation of their breeding areas. During his study of the warbler, he introduced a standardized measure of nesting success based on his professional experience in industry and from his training in mathematics. This method now widely known as the Mayfield Method involves probability calculations that take into account nests that the observer was unable to locate. Prior to his work, ornithologists used naïve approaches based on fractions of number of successful young or nests from a total of nests that they had found.

== Life and work ==
Harold was born as James Blegen to John Blegen and Ida Thorberg before they were married. Due to the social stigma of the time he was given away for adoption and raised by Frank and Mae Ford Mayfield in Iowa. He grew up in Alton, Illinois and showed talent as a basketball player. He received a BS from Shurtleff College, Carbondale and an MS in mathematics from the University of Illinois, Champaign-Urbana. He then worked as a teacher at Alton and then moved to work at the Owens-Illinois Company. He then became a director of personnel at Toledo publishing in business and management journals. He served as an advisor to the Kennedy and Johnson administrations as a member of the council on economic opportunity and won a distinguished service award in 1965 from the American Association of Industrial Management.

When Mayfield was 28, he was incapacitated by a stroke and resolved to study birds during the recovery. With help from Josselyn Van Tyne of the University of Michigan he began a study of Kirtland's warbler which eventually resulted in a monograph The Kirtland's Warbler (1960) for which he received a Brewster Medal in 1961. He also worked on efforts to preserve, manage and monitor the habitats in the breeding areas of Kirtland's warbler. Mayfield discovered that the bird preferred young jack pines but the management of small plots did not induce their breeding and he then discovered that they nested in clusters with several males competing to mark out their territories. He then identified the minimum area needed to be managed for ensuring their breeding. Mayfield's most famous contribution was a method that he developed for calculating nest success that takes into account nests that the observer did not locate. He developed the method using his mathematical training as a matter of fact during his Kirtland's warbler study and then went on to explain it to the wider ornithological world in his 1961 paper and further attempting to simplify the procedure in a 1975 paper. His probabilistic approach to calculating nest success was derived from his professional experience in industrial safety where incidents were calculated according to per-worker-day exposure. Mayfield made several trips to the Arctic Circle and one of his studies was on the breeding biology of the red phalarope. Mayfield received the 1990 Arthur A. Allen Award from Cornell University and the 2003 lifetime achievement award of the Toledo Naturalists' Association. Mayfield published nearly 200 papers in ornithology but saw himself as an amateur in the field of ornithology and examined the historic role of amateurs in ornithology in a 1979 article. Mayfield was the only person to have served as a president for the American Ornithologists’ Union, Cooper Ornithological Society, as well as the Wilson Ornithological Society.

== Personal life ==
Mayfield married Virginia Duval and they had four children. When Mayfield was aged 70 he discovered that his biological mother was still alive. After writing to her he was invited to Minnesota where they met. He also met his four siblings who had been born after their parents' marriage and had been unaware of his existence.
