= Chandler Robbins Award =

Annual birding award

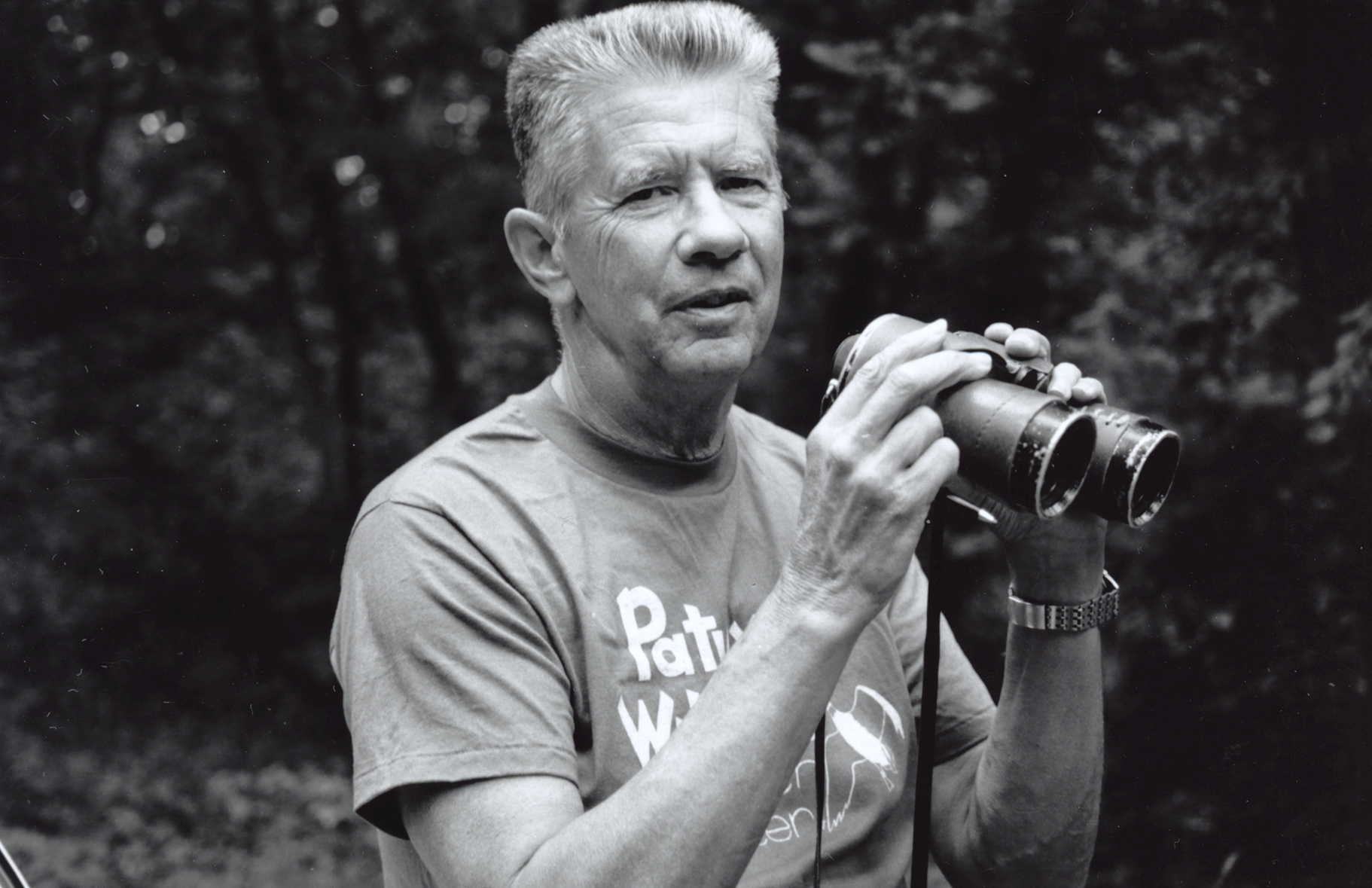
Chandler Robbins

The ABA Chandler Robbins Award for Education/Conservation is an award given by the American Birding Association to an individual who has made significant contributions either to the education of birders or to bird conservation and the "management or preservation of habitats on which birds and birding depends." The award may also recognize efforts in both fields.

One of five awards presented by the ABA for contributions to ornithology, the award is named in honor of Chandler Robbins, who himself advanced both conservation and education. Robbins is author of an influential field guide to birds and the architect of the North American Breeding Bird Survey.

The award was first bestowed on Ted Lee Eubanks.

== List of recipients ==
Since the award's inception in 2000, there have been 18 recipients.

Year	Name	Notes
2000	Ted Lee Eubanks	
2002	Charles Duncan	
2003	David N. Pashley	
2004	Jerome Jackson	
2006	Robert Ridgely	
2007	Jerry Bertrand	
2008	Richard M. Daley	For his "innovative and far-reaching agenda in Chicago to create and promote a bird-friendly environment in an urban area."
2009	George Fenwick	
2010	David DeSante	
2011	Donald Messersmith	
2012	Joseph Coleman	
2013	Tammy VerCauteren	
2014	Andrew Kinslow	
2015	Kimberly Kaufman	Two winners in 2015.
2015	George Radcliffe	Two winners in 2015.
2016	Robert A. Lewis	
2018	Denver Holt	For his work on owl research, education, and conservation.
2024	Mary Gustafson	Posthumously.

== See also ==
- List of ornithology awards
