= American Birding Association =

Amateur ornithological association

- American Birding Association, Inc.
- Abbreviation: ABA
- Formation: 1968; 58 years ago
- Type: Nonprofit
- Tax ID no.: 74-2347314
- Legal status: 501(c)(3)
- Headquarters: Colorado Springs, Colorado
- Location: United States
- Region served: North America
- Board Chair: Chris Sloan
- Executive Director: Wayne Klockner
- Board of directors: George Armistead; David Bates; Sara Beesley; David Bell; Jeff Bouton; Gates Dupont; Willie Hendrickson; Bo Hopkins; Jean Iron; Jeff Rusinow; Chris Sloan; Tahmina Watson
- Main organ: Board of Directors
- Website: https://www.aba.org/

The American Birding Association (ABA) is a nonprofit organization, founded in 1969, dedicated to recreational birding in Canada and the United States. It has been called "the standard-bearer for serious birding in North America." Originally concentrated on finding, listing, and identifying rare birds, the ABA now seeks to serve all birders with a wide range of services and publications.

== History ==
In December 1968, in the first issue (volume 0, number 0) of The Birdwatcher's Digest, Jim Tucker proposed the formation of a group to be known as the "American Birdwatchers' Association" for the exchange of information and the comparison of birding lists.

On the suggestion of Stuart Keith, the next issue of Tucker's newsletter bore the name Birding (volume 1, number 1). This January/February 1969 issue included a statement of intentions and objectives and three pages of lists, including the birders with the top ten lists for the world and for the area then covered by the checklist of the American Ornithologists' Union. The organization was renamed the American Birding Association. Expressly excluding conservation advocacy and ornithological research, the ABA's initial focus was on the hobby and sport of birding. Through its publications and events, the early ABA sought to connect avid birders, establish rules for listing, and communicate the latest identification techniques. By 1970, the organization had more than 500 members.

The first officers included Keith as president, Arnold Small as vice president, and Tucker as secretary and treasurer. Shortly thereafter, Joseph W. Taylor became treasurer, and Bob Smart joined as second vice president. Benton Basham became membership chairman in 1971, and was responsible for much of the organization's growth.

Beginning with volume 3 (1971), Birding was redesigned as a magazine; the annual page count increased to 258 from 96 in 1970. The last issue of 1971 introduced a new full-color logo, designed by Guy Tudor, with the image of a red-billed tropicbird.

The ABA held its first convention in 1973 in Kenmare, North Dakota and its second in Leamington, Ontario.

Subsequent presidents of the organization have included Arnold Small (1976-1979), Joseph W. (Joe) Taylor (1979-1983), Lawrence G. (Larry) Balch (1983-1989), and Allan Keith (1989-1993; 1997–1999). As of 2022, Julie Davis is the current board chair and interim president of the ABA.

Membership rose to 6,500 by October 1986 and first exceeded 10,000 in October 1992. The ABA attained a high of 22,000 members in 2001.

A monthly newsletter, Winging It, was published from 1989 to 2012. In 1998, the ABA assumed responsibility for the publication of the National Audubon Society's journal Field Notes, subsequently renamed North American Birds. The quarterly "Birder's Guide" first appeared in 2013.

In 2000, the ABA assumed management of the Institute for Field Ornithology workshops conducted by the University of Maine at Machias.

The ABA's mission has expanded to support conservation and research efforts, beginning with its partnership with Birders' Exchange, a program supplying research equipment to young scientists in Central and South America. Conservation-oriented content began to appear more frequently in Birding with the 2001 volume.

== Publications ==
The ABA publishes three periodical publications, offering them in print and online formats. The ABA also hosts two blogs and a podcast. The ABA partners with and advises Scott & Nix, Inc., publisher of a series of recent and forthcoming ABA State Guides. The ABA also publishes a regularly updated checklist and occasional eBooks and monographs.

=== Print publications ===
The ABA publishes Birding, its bimonthly magazine; North American Birds, the quarterly "journal of record" for North American birdlife; and Birder's Guide, a quarterly publication with a rotating schedule of themes. All three journals are offered in print and online formats.

The ABA has published bird-finding guides to various states and regions of the United States and the Caribbean (10 titles are in print). The ABA is a partner in the ongoing publication of a series of photographic field guides to the birds of particular states (12 titles).

=== Online publications ===
The ABA maintains a multiauthored blog and a multi-voiced podcast; ABA's youth program hosts the blog The Eyrie. The ABA's journals Birding, North American Birds, and Birder's Guide are offered online, as well as in print.

=== ABA Checklist ===
The ABA publishes a checklist of the more than 1000 bird species found in the ABA area (the entirety of the United States and Canada, plus St. Pierre et Miquelon). Updates to the most recent print edition are available online. The Checklist provides the common names established and recommended by the American Ornithological Society, and it is one of the authorities consulted by the compilers of many popular bird identification guides in order to establish ranges and the status of populations.

== Programs ==
The ABA offers birding camps, sponsors youth teams in birding competitions, provides scholarships, and conducts an annual ABA Young Birder of the Year Contest.

Members interested in bird listing share their totals at Listing Central.

The organization promulgates a Code of Birding Ethics, guiding birders to protect birds, the environment, and the rights of others.

In addition to offering ABA apparel, the organization has partnered with for-profit companies to sell identification and bird-finding guides, binoculars, and items related to conservation.

The ABA offers birding rallies, tours, and workshops (through the ABA Institute for Field Ornithology) throughout the world. The IFO workshops, established to foster cooperation between professional and amateur ornithologists, blend classroom instruction and field study.

== Awards ==
The ABA presents several awards for promoting the cause of birding, advancing the state of ornithology, and making significant contributions to education and conservation. In 1980, it initiated the Ludlow Griscom Award to recognize "outstanding contributions to excellence in field birding;" it is often called birding's highest honor. In 2000, the awards program was expanded to include the Chandler Robbins Award for Education/Conservation, the Claudia Wilds Award for Distinguished Service, and the Roger Tory Peterson Award for Promoting the Cause of Birding. The Robert Ridgway Award for Publications in Field Ornithology was added in 2002. The Griscom Award now specifically recognizes outstanding contributions to regional ornithology.

In 2014, the ABA introduced the Betty Petersen Award for Conservation and Community, to honor "those who have made great strides in expanding, diversifying, and strengthening the birding community, and those who have worked to build a support network for conservation." The first, posthumous recipient was Betty Petersen. In 2015, the award was granted to Jack Siler; Ann Nightingale received the award in 2016; Judy Pollock was honored in 2017.

== See also ==
- Big year
- The Big Year, 2011 film
