= Linnaean Society of New York =

U.S. non-profit organization

The Linnaean Society of New York (LSNY) was established in 1878, in the city of New York, United States, by a group of amateurs interested in natural science, especially ornithology. The Society is named after the eighteenth-century Swedish naturalist Carl Linnaeus, who developed the system of binomial nomenclature for the modern biological classification of organisms. The founding members included H.P. Bailey, Eugene P. Bicknell, Ernest Ingersoll, Clinton Hart Merriam and John Burroughs.
