= Twitchers' vocabulary =

Birding jargon used by twitchers

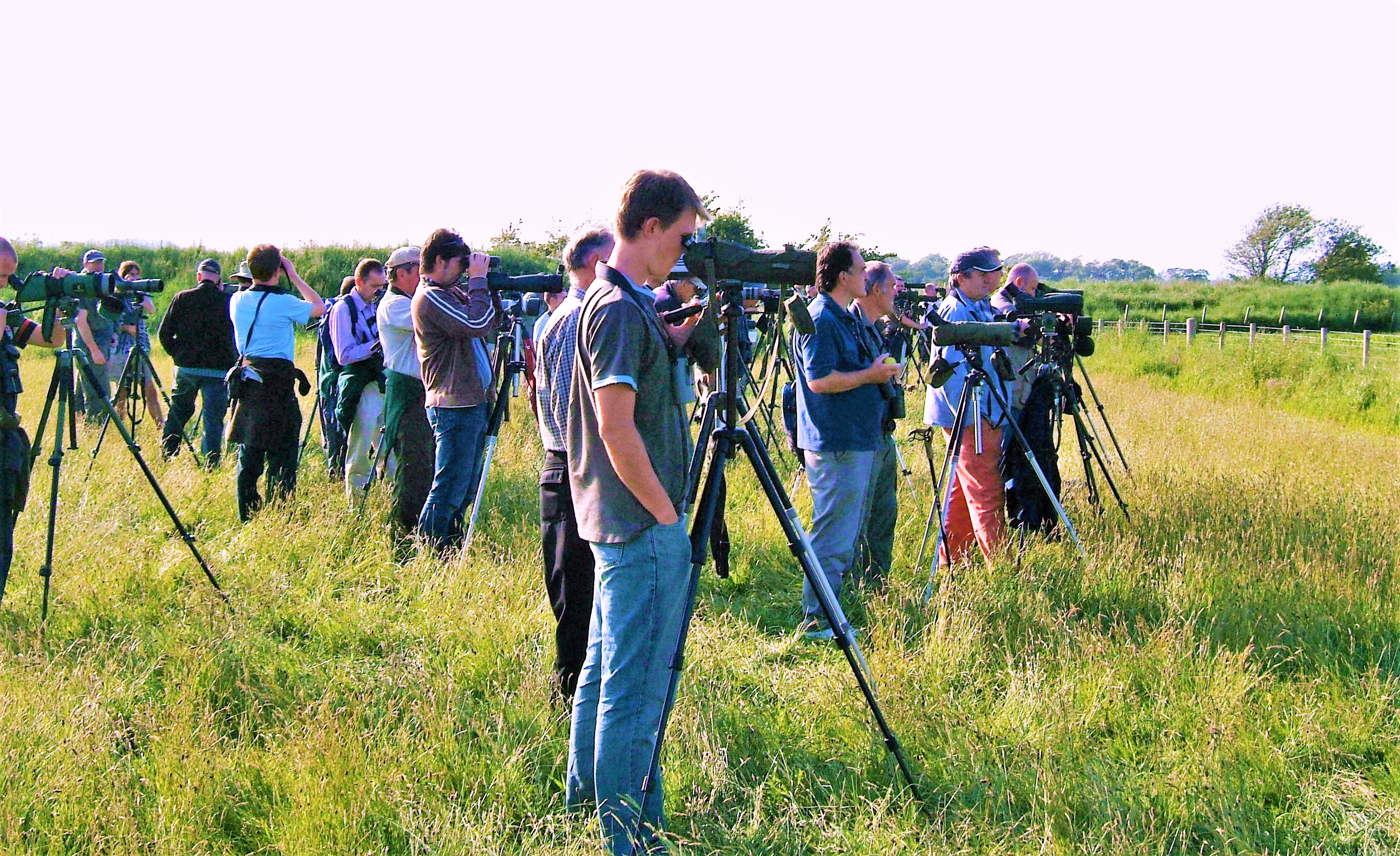
Twitchers watching a mega (Britain's fifth-ever white-tailed lapwing) and probably adding a lifer to their list; see text for explanation of italicised terms

Twitchers' vocabulary is the set of jargon words used by birders and twitchers (committed birdwatchers who travel long distances to see a new species to add a species to their "life list", year list or other list). Some terms may be specific to regional birding communities, and not all are used due to dialectic and cultural differences.

== Terms ==
Big Day
a birding event in which a birder or team of birders tries to see as many species of birds as possible within a calendar day.
Big Year
a birding event in which a birder tries to see as many species of birds as possible within a defined area (country, county, state, ABA area, etc.) within a calendar year; originated with the American Birding Association, and the basis for the movie The Big Year.
To burn out
To bird to the point of no longer wanting to continue birding/twitching.
To burn up or flog
to beat around in the undergrowth hoping to flush a bird. A desperate measure and not a kind way to treat an exhausted migrant.
BVD
"Better View Desired", describing a lifer that was observed well enough to identify, but not enjoy.
CBC
Christmas Bird Count, an annual bird census in North America and Canada.
CFW (Eastern North America)
An abbreviation that stands for "Confusing Fall Warbler" (During fall migration and through mid spring, most New World warblers found in the Eastern US and Canada tend to be in juvenile or nonbreeding plumage, and therefore have relatively few distinctive markings or patterns).
Chooks (Australia)
already seen or common birds.
Crippler (UK)
a rare and spectacular bird that shows brilliantly, perhaps an allusion towards its preventing people from moving on.
Crush (verb, U.S.)
to get very high-quality photos of a bird, often referred to as a banger. See hammer
Dip (or dip out)
to miss seeing a bird which you were looking for.
Dude
"a bird-watcher who doesn't really know all that much about birds". A novice birdwatcher; slightly pejorative term. Also used to refer to someone who primarily seeks out birds for photography rather than study.
Empid (largely US)
any of the flycatchers of the genus Empidonax, infamous among North American birders for being difficult to identify in the field without the aid of vocalizations.
Fall (UK) or Fallout (US)
a natural occurrence where migratory birds are forced down by adverse weather in a way that makes them congregate in large numbers; generally associated with meteorological and geographical conditions (in the UK, often on the east coast in autumn; in the US largely in spring, generally along the Texas to Florida coasts of the Gulf of Mexico).
First
a first record of a species (in a defined area, such as a county first).
Foofer (AUS)
a target species who is only seen either before or after your bird survey officially starts, but not during.
Grip (or grip off) (UK)
to see a bird which another birder missed and to tell them you've seen it.
Hammer (US)
to get high-quality photos of a bird.
Jizz (or giss)
the overall impression given by the general shape, movement, behaviour, etc., of a species rather than any particular feature. Experienced birders can often identify species, even with only fleeting or distant views, on jizz alone.
LBJ (or little brown job)
drab birds that are difficult to differentiate and identify; see also little brown bird.
Lifer
a first-ever sighting of a bird species by an observer; an addition to one's life list.
List
as a noun, a list of all species seen by a particular observer (often qualified, e.g. life list, county list, year list, etc.). Keen twitchers may keep several lists, and some listers compete to amass longer lists than their rivals. As a verb, it means to keep or compile a bird list (a lister is someone who is intensely focused on keeping and growing lists, and can be used negatively).
m.ob. or mobs or MOB
an abbreviation that stands for "many observers", often used as a collective noun
Mega or megatick
a very rare bird
Nemesis (or nemesis bird)
a bird that has eluded a birder despite multiple attempts to see it.
NFC
Stands for Nocturnal Flight Count: To conduct a survey of birds migrating at night by listening for their flight calls, often with a dedicated microphone.
Patagonia Picnic Table Effect (or Patagonia Roadside Rest Effect) (US)
the phenomenon that occurs when one bird draws many birders to a remote area, who then find more rarities and other interesting species in that same location. Named after an actual roadside rest area just west of Patagonia, Arizona.
Patch (or local patch)
a birding location or set of birding locations near one's home that a birder visits frequently.
Pelagic (noun)
a boat trip designed for birders to find open-ocean (pelagic) species, such as albatrosses.
Pish (US)
an emphatic shushing or hissing noise used by North American birders to elicit mobbing behaviour; made in imitation of alarm calls of chickadees and titmice.
Peep (US)
a collective term for the five smallest North American Calidris sandpipers: least sandpiper, semipalmated sandpiper, Western sandpiper, white-rumped sandpiper, and Baird's sandpiper
Plastic (UK)
adjective used to indicate a bird which has escaped from captivity, rather than a genuinely wild bird.
To rack (or colloquially as a noun, rackery) (US)
To add multiple birds to your list in an unexpectedly short period of time.
Seawatch or seawatching
scanning from a coastal watchpoint, usually a prominent headland, to observe seabirds on migration.
Sibe
a bird from Siberia (usually applied to rare migrants).
Siesta time (also the doldrums) (US)
the period in mid-afternoon when birds (and therefore birders) are least active.
Skywatch (noun; US)
a term used to describe a stationary period of observation of birds migrating overland, usually raptors or passerines; largely synonymous with vis-mig (q.v., below).
Slash (US)
a cryptic species pair (on a day list), e.g. long-billed dowitcher/short-billed dowitcher, willow flycatcher/alder flycatcher
SOB (US)
"Spouse of Birder", a non-birder spouse.
Sp. (UK; /sˈp/) or spuh (US; /spʌh/)
birds that are only identifiable to genus level (on a day list) (from "sp.", abbreviated form of species).
Spark bird (US)
a species that triggers a lifelong obsession with birding.
String
a dubious, "ropy" record. As an adjective a record may be stringy, and to claim one is to string. The term stringer usually denotes people who intentionally mislead and falsify bird sightings, as opposed to well-intentioned mistakes made from lack of field experience.
Tick
an addition to a personal list (sometimes qualified as year tick, county tick, etc.). Life tick (largely US) and lifer (largely UK) are synonymous. A tart's tick is a relatively common species added to one's list later than might be expected. An armchair tick is an addition without leaving one's home, typically as a result of a taxonomic change.
Togger (UK)
a slightly pejorative term used to refer to someone who primarily seeks out birds for photography rather than watching or study.
Trash bird (US)
a bird that is so common in an area it becomes annoying and is largely ignored by birders (as the common starling, rock dove, or house sparrow). Sometimes used sarcastically, as in "You're excited about seeing a bald eagle? It's a trash bird for us in Alaska."
Twitch (UK)
the act of traveling a long distance to see a rare bird. Synonymous with chase (US).
Vagrant
a stray far from normal ecological range.
Vis-mig (variants vismig, vis mig, viz mig, etc.; action vis-migging; UK, Europe)
from "visible migration"; a term used to describe a stationary period of observation of birds migrating overland; largely synonymous with skywatch (q.v., above).
Warbler neck (US)
a painful crick in the neck from looking at birds high in the treetops. Named after the New World warblers, which are often found in the tops of trees.
Yank (UK)
a bird from North America usually applied to vagrants seen in Europe.
Zootie (US, uncommon)
a locally rare or unusual bird.

Some species have nicknames, for example: "RB Flicker" for the red-breasted flycatcher, "Gropper" for the grasshopper warbler, "PG Tips" for Pallas's grasshopper warbler; in the US, these are generally reserved for common species ("TV" for the turkey vulture or "butterbutt" for the yellow-rumped warbler). Every bird found in the US has a formal four-letter banding code formed with the first letters of its name (for example, the Carolina chickadee is CACH, the white-throated sparrow is WTSP, and the black-and-white warbler is BAWW), and these abbreviated species terms often find their way into American slang. Twitchers (and birders in general) will also use a mixture of scientific and slang terms for feather tracts and so on.
