= Listers: A Glimpse Into Extreme Birdwatching =

2025 documentary film

- YouTube thumbnail
- Directed by: Owen Reiser
- Release date: August 19, 2025
- Running time: 119 minutes
- Country: United States
- Language: English

Listers: A Glimpse Into Extreme Birdwatching is a 2025 documentary film about birding by brothers Owen and Quentin Reiser and published on YouTube. The feature-length film follows the brothers as they attempt a big year, a birdwatching term for an attempt to observe as many species of bird as possible in a calendar year. The film received positive reviews for its cinematography, humor, and appeal beyond the birding community. It was released with an accompanying book, Field Guide of All the Birds We Found One Year in the United States.

== Premise and production ==
Listers is a travel documentary following Owen Reiser, a wildlife photographer whose work has been featured in National Geographic, and his brother Quentin Reiser, who became interested in learning about birds after reading the family's bird guide while high on marijuana. The brothers decide to undertake a big year, a birding term for an "extreme" version of the hobby in which one see as many birds as possible over the course of a calendar year, and something typically attempted only by highly experienced birders. The Reisers start near St. Louis, Missouri and plan their trip by simply Googling "what states have the most birds" and driving there. Over the course of 2024, the brothers travel the contiguous United States in a 2010 Kia Sedona, attempting to witness and identify as many bird species as possible, sometimes with great difficulty or enduring harsh conditions.

The film alternates between high-resolution footage of the birds observed and rough, handheld camcorder footage of the brothers and their experiences traveling the country and living out of a van. It was produced with a budget of $16,000, relying on savings, Patreon donations, public parks, Cracker Barrel parking lots, DIY boats, and canned food. Owen directed, produced, edited, filmed, contributed stop-motion animation, and served as primary videographer, while Quentin was the photographer, secondary videographer, and most frequent on-screen personality.

The Reisers conduct several interviews with members of the birding community, including competitive and casual birders. Interview subjects include Ezekiel Dobson, a 19-year-old competitive birder who broke the US big year record with 758 species in 2024, and Tammy and David McQuade, who recorded 700+ species in multiple consecutive years.

The documentary covers controversies and debates in the birding community, including the use of recorded bird sounds as a lure, birders lying about what birds they have seen, and the increasing gamification of birding through apps like eBird and Merlin. The Reisers ended their big year with 579 birds, having covered 38,757 mi (62,373 km) in their route around the US. Quentin told St. Louis Public Radio that "the whole thing started as a joke, but we fell in love with birds and bird watching".

== Release and reception ==
The film was released on YouTube without advertising on August 19, 2025, reaching over 1.3 million views within a month. By March 2026, it had been viewed 3 million times. The Reisers received offers from Netflix, HBO, and Amazon to distribute the film, but turned them down. It screened during the 2026 Fresh Coast Film Festival in May 2026.

Writing for Slate, birder Nicholas Lund called it "the most talked-about birding movie in ages" and compared the film's style to the gonzo journalism of Hunter S. Thompson and internet creator Andrew Callaghan. He noted the broad appeal of the film, but said that as a birder, he appreciated "that it's the first time we've seen 'real' birding on screen. This is the birding of gas stations, ponds behind a women's prison, and 'the bird's right there on the mud next to the Wiffle ball and the tire". It went on to make Slate's top 10 movies of the year. Eric Cox of Northern Express said it was "often hilarious, beautifully photographed, and packed with bird and human encounters that range from the mundane to the truly fascinating". Tyler Austin Harper of The Atlantic praised the wildlife photography and called it "one of the funniest documentaries I’ve seen in some time." Harper also stated that beneath the film's "stoner" façade, it contained a serious message about the negative impacts of social apps like eBird on hobbyists. GearJunkie also praised the bird footage and editing.

Interested in continuing their bird-centric documentary filmmaking, the Reisers are currently working on a project about ivory-billed woodpeckers, which are likely extinct but the subject of multiple controversial sightings. They plan to release it for free on YouTube in spring 2026. They are also attached to a planned Amplify Pictures and Rough House Pictures series following them as they explore fishing subcultures before entering a bass fishing tournament.

== Field guide ==
The documentary includes some illustrations and descriptions of birds by Quentin Reiser, which were then published ("with help from Owen") as an accompanying book, Field Guide of All the Birds We Found One Year in the United States in 2025. The guide also has information about how they approached their big year for the documentary, including QR codes that link to outtakes. It is organized according to the order the brothers saw the birds rather than by taxonomy. In a review for 10,000 Birds, Catherine Carroll called the book "hilarious", "astonishingly clever and, dare I say it, well-illustrated". Whereas the film was praised for being entertaining to birders and non-birders alike, Carroll said of the book that non-birders are less likely to appreciate "the truth, accuracy, and humor or what [Quentin] writes and illustrates".
