= Great Backyard Bird Count =

Citizen science project

The Great Backyard Bird Count (GBBC) is a community science project in ornithology. It is conducted annually in mid-February. The event is supported by the Cornell Lab of Ornithology and the National Audubon Society. During this four-day event, birdwatchers around the world are invited to count and report details of birds in the area in which they live. Data collected is submitted in eBird an online web interface, and compiled for use in scientific research. The GBBC was the first community science project to collect bird sightings online and display results in near real-time.

== Overview ==
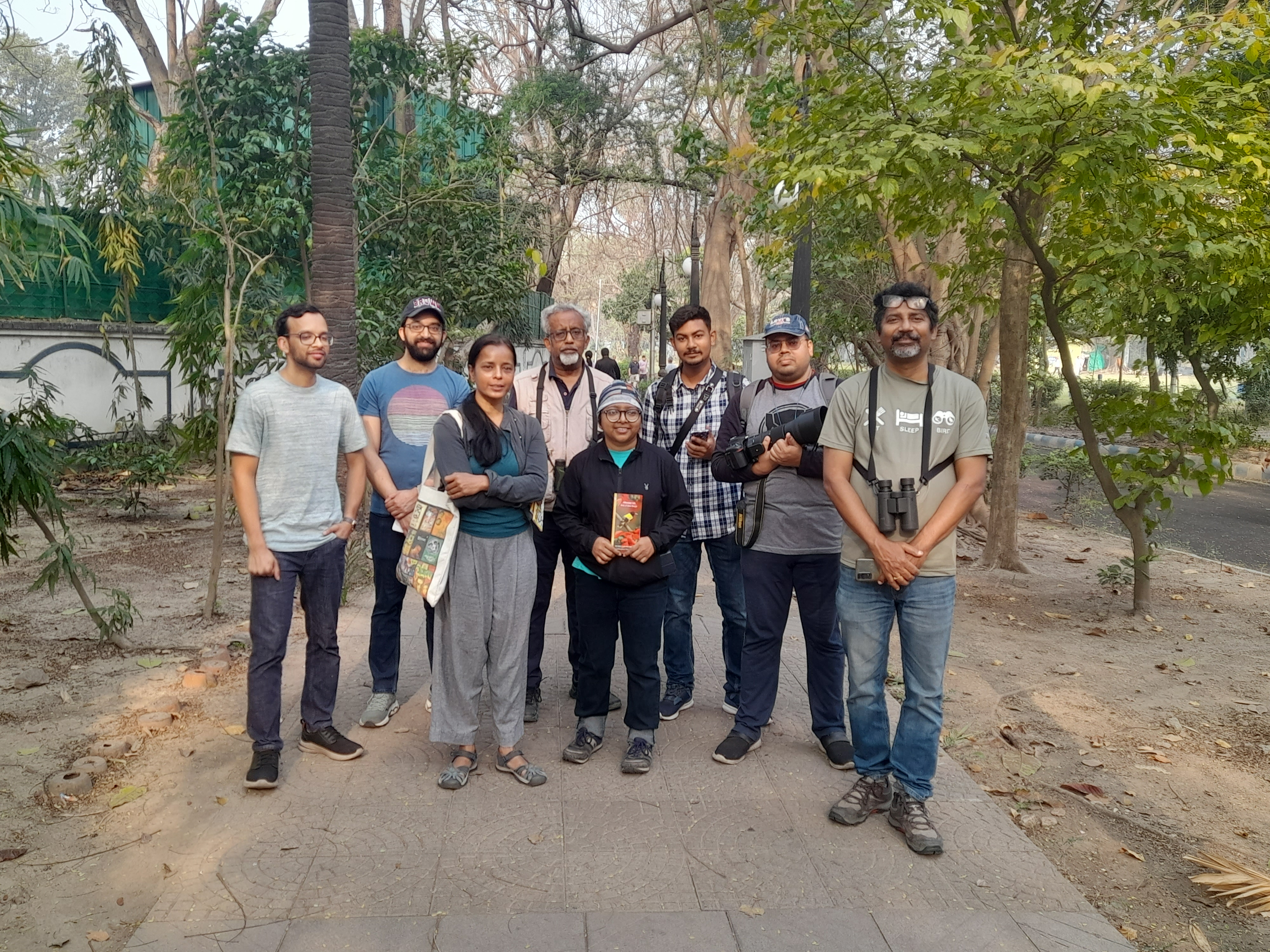
GBBC participants at Rabindra Sarobar on 17 February morning

The GBBC was first launched in 1998 in the US. It is conducted around the second week of February. Since 2013, the event has been observed by international bird watchers, and anyone can now participate in the event. Additional wildlife and conservation institutes around the world have also supported and participated. A number of separate bird watch efforts have been coordinated so as to coincide with the GBBC. In 2015 nearly half of known bird species worldwide were reported.

Data collected during the event is subjected to verification by experts, in order to overcome potential shortcomings in the abilities of amateur participants. Data resulting from the event has raised awareness about changes in the population and habitats of common birds.
