= Bird codes =

System of short abbreviations for bird names

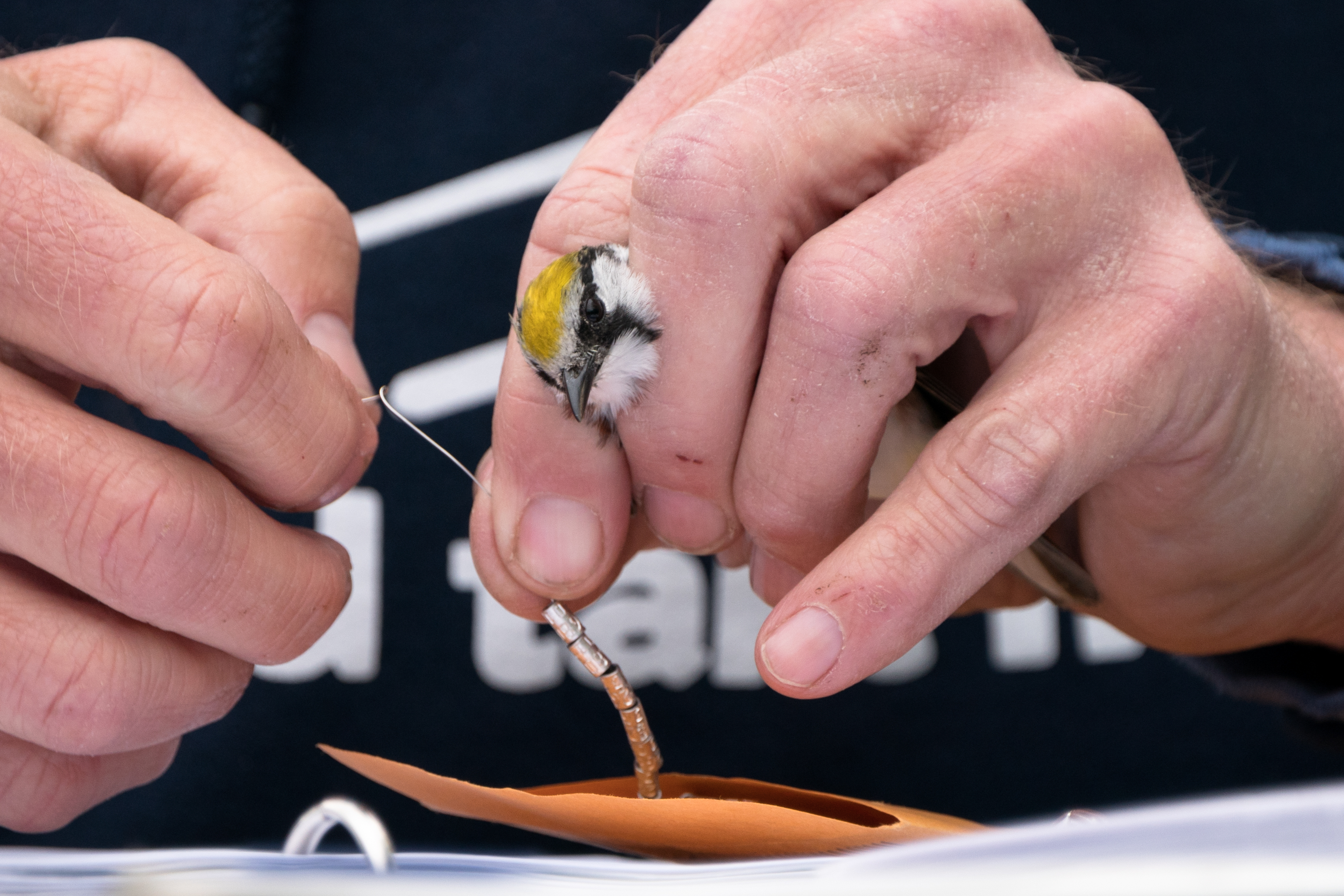
A researcher selects a band to attach to the leg a Chestnut-sided warbler at a bird banding station at Murphy-Hanrehan Park Reserve in Savage, Minnesota. The bird was captured in a mist net.

Bird codes, also known as banding codes or alpha codes, are four-letter abbreviations for bird names used by bird banders, ornithologists, and birdwatchers in North and Central America. The codes are written in capital letters, and look like, e.g., MODO for mourning dove.

There are two very similar systems of these codes currently in use, one maintained by the Bird Banding Laboratory (BBL) of the North American Bird Banding Program, and the other by the Institute for Bird Populations (IBP). The codes used by the two systems are the same for most birds, but not for all.

== History ==
The Bird Banding Laboratory codes first appeared in published form in 1978, and their use gradually spread from bird banders to ornithologists and birdwatchers.

The Institute for Bird Populations codes were created in 2003 with the goal of addressing shortcomings of the BBL codes:

- The BBL codes omit some birds, notably Galliformes. The IBP codes include all birds in the covered area.
- The BBL codes involved human decisions (see Rules, below, for an example), and some codes are based on historical names which have since changed. The IBP codes are entirely rule-based.
- The BBL codes are not updated on a fixed schedule and become out of date as names of birds are changed. The IBP codes are updated annually to reflect naming decisions of the American Ornithological Society.

Additionally the IBP list expands coverage beyond Canada and the United States to include Mexico, Central America, and the Caribbean. It also provides a corresponding list of six-letter codes based on birds' scientific names.

== Rules ==
The basic rules for determining the codes are simple and are similar in both systems:

- For a bird with a one-word name, use the first four letters of the name, e.g., mallard is MALL.
- For a bird with a two-word name, use the first two letters of the first word followed by the first two letters of the second word, e.g., wood duck is WODU.
- For a bird with a three-word name the first two of which are hyphenated, use the first letter of the first word, the first letter of the second word, and the first two letters of the third word, e.g., blue-winged teal is BWTE.

and so on.

Complications, and differences between the two systems, arise when two birds would have the same code according to these rules (known as a collision), e.g., Canada goose and cackling goose should both be CAGO. The BBL system gives this code to the Canada goose since it is the more common bird, and gives CACG to the cackling goose. In the IBP system, neither species receives the CAGO code. The cackling goose is still CACG, but the Canada goose is CANG.

== Use ==
Alpha codes can make data entry much more efficient, but are widely disliked as a means of general communication. They are a mystery to non-birders or less experienced birders, and even among experienced birders they rely on memorization. For data entry, however, they have come into their own with cell phone apps, notably field guide apps and eBird, a widely used citizen science app for viewing and submitting bird observations. Use of the codes here is easy even for non-experts, since the full name is visible for confirmation and the apps can show multiple possibilities if the code is ambiguous.
