= Henry Henshaw =

American ornithologist and ethnologist

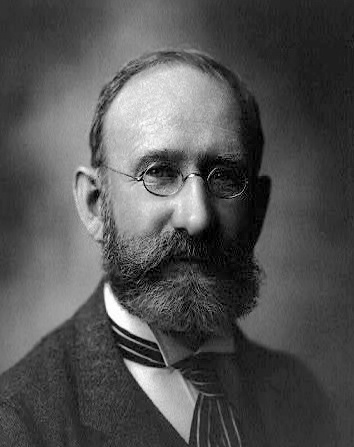
- Henshaw in 1904
- Born: March 3, 1850; Cambridgeport, Massachusetts, U.S.
- Died: August 1, 1930 (aged 80); Washington, D.C.
- Education: Cambridge High School
- Occupation: Ornithologist
- Employer: U.S. Biological Survey
- Known for: Co-founding the National Geographic Society, Wildlife Conservation in Hawaii

Henry Wetherbee Henshaw (March 3, 1850 – August 1, 1930) was an American ornithologist and ethnologist. He worked at the U.S. Bureau of Ethnology from 1888 to 1892 and was editor of the journal American Anthropologist.

== Biography ==
=== Early life ===
Henry Henshaw was born to William and Sarah Holden Wetherbee. He studied at Cambridge High School where he met William Brewster. In 1869 he was forced to give up school due to ill health, and went on a collecting trip to Louisiana. This marked the start of his career as a field naturalist.

In 1870 Henshaw traveled to Florida with naturalist Charles Johnson Maynard and artist Edwin Lord Weeks. In the same year he found the first Baird's sandpiper east of the Mississippi River, in Boston. It was through this discovery that Henshaw became known to the secretary of the Smithsonian, Spencer Baird. In 1872 he went to Utah as natural history collector on the Wheeler Survey, continuing until it merged with the United States Geological Survey in 1879.

=== Out West ===
In 1872 Henshaw went to Salt Lake City on the Wheeler Survey as a naturalist, and in 1874 had his most successful field expedition, going from Santa Fe, New Mexico to Gila River and south-western Arizona. There he met with the native Apaches, and caught specimens for the Smithsonian. In 1875, he returned to Washington, and was approached by John Wesley Powell of the Bureau of Ethnology. Along with C. Hart Merriam and Grove Karl Gilbert, Henshaw set out West on the United States Geological Survey, where in addition to his ornithological work, Henshaw worked on linguistics and anthropology, eventually compiling two volume book titled Handbook of North American Indians North of Mexico.

=== Hawaii ===
In 1894, in ill health after a severe attack of influenza that left him hospitalized, Henshaw moved to Hawaii with the express intent of becoming a citizen of the island nation, and in search of better health. There, he picked up photography. As his health returned, he returned to ornithology, especially related to birds of the Hilo area, where he lived, as well as those in the drier, higher elevations around Mauna Kea. He collected and preserved hundreds of specimens and published two works on Hawaiian birds. Viewing the mass extinction of birds in Hawaii would later make Henshaw a conservationist. He left Hawaii in 1904 to return to Washington, D.C.

=== Conservation ===
In 1910, Henshaw replaced his old friend C. Hart Merriam as the head of the U.S. Biological Survey. With new-found zeal, Henshaw began working for bird conservation, publishing Fifty Common Birds of Farm and Orchard, which sold 200,000 copies, in 1913. This publication caused Henshaw to be approached by Gilbert Hovey Grosvenor, who asked Henshaw if Fifty Common Birds of Farm and Orchard could be printed in the National Geographic Magazine. The result of that publication was the National Geographic Field Guide to Birds of North America. While not working with the National Geographic, Henshaw lobbied, along with George Shiras, to pass the Weeks-McLean Act, otherwise known as the Migratory Bird Law. Henshaw handed Woodrow Wilson the pen with which Wilson signed the Act into law in 1913.

=== Later life ===
Henshaw retired in 1916, and lived in Washington, D.C., unmarried until the end of his days. In his old, age he began studying algae. Henshaw died on August 1, 1930, aged 81.

== Organizations ==
Henshaw was one of the founders of the Nuttall Ornithological Club in 1873, the American Ornithologists' Union in 1883, and the National Geographic Society in 1888.

== Legacy ==
Henshaw is commemorated in the scientific name of a species of lizard, Xantusia henshawi.
