= Patagonia picnic table effect =

Phenomenon in birdwatcing

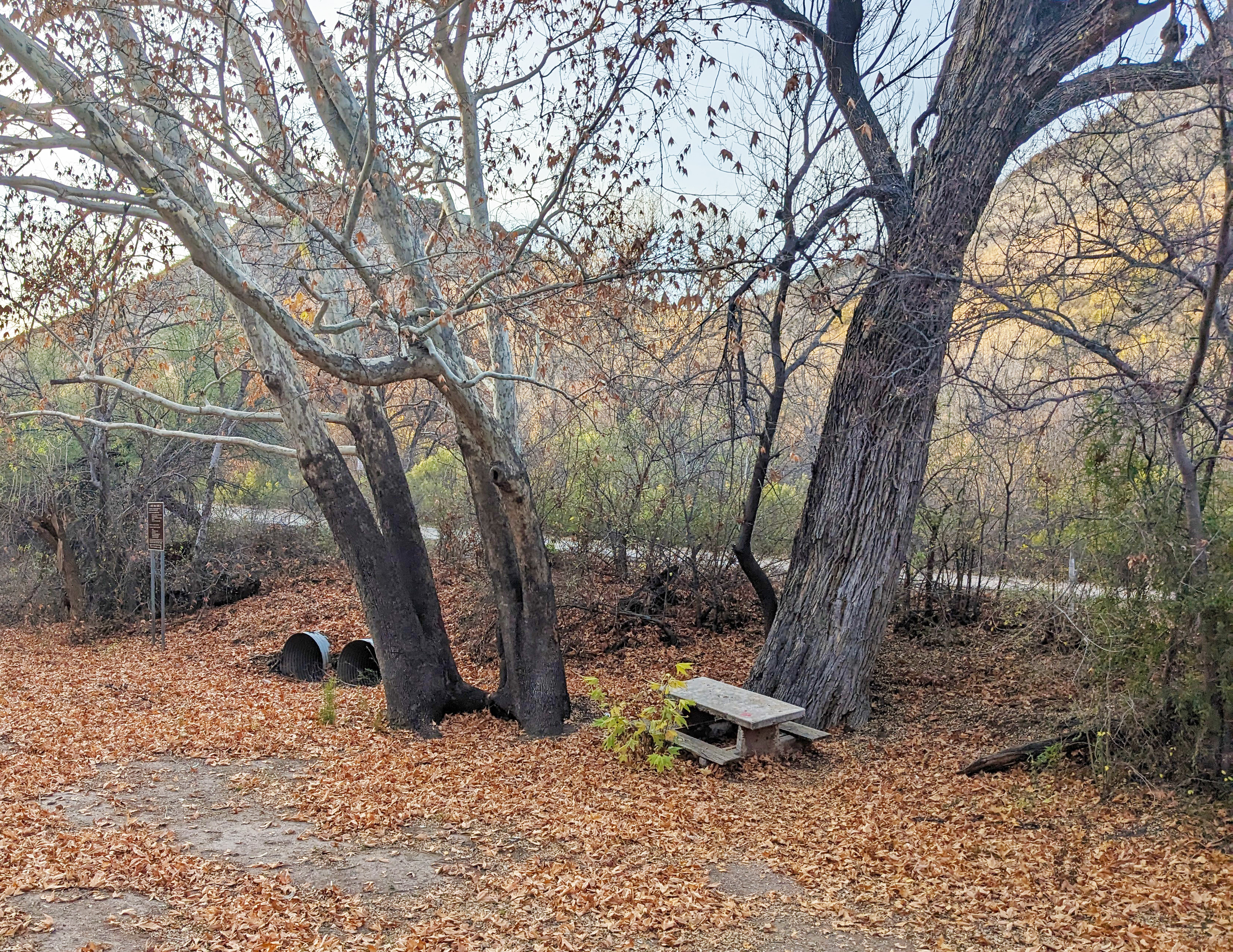
The picnic table in Patagonia, Arizona, that led to the term's name, since fallen into disrepair.

The Patagonia picnic table effect (also known as the Patagonia rest area effect or Patagonia rest stop effect) is a phenomenon associated with birding in which an influx of birdwatchers following the discovery of a rare bird at a location results in the discovery of further rare birds at that location, and so on, with the end result being that the locality becomes well known for rare birds, even though in itself it may be little or no better than other similar localities. This is due to an increase in attendance leading to increased potential for rare birds to be viewed there.

The name arises from the Arizona State Route 82 rest stop and picnic table south of Patagonia, US, where the phenomenon was first noted. As of August 2026, 232 species have been recorded there.

Research from Oregon State University suggests that the phenomenon may be a myth; no significant difference was found between a period surrounding rare-bird events at a site and a baseline in the findings of rare birds. It suggests that much of the draw is due to increased use of online sources such as eBird.

== See also ==
- Selection bias
- Wisdom of the crowd
