= Flock Around =

2026 video game

- Developer: Friend Shaped Games
- Publishers: Friend Shaped Games; Outersloth
- Engine: Godot
- Platforms: Windows; macOS; Linux
- Release: 24 April 2026
- Genres: Simulation; Photography
- Modes: Single-player; Multiplayer

Flock Around is a 2026 birdwatching and photography video game developed by Canadian studio Friend Shaped Games and published by Friend Shaped Games and Outersloth. It was released on Steam on 24 April 2026 and is available for Windows, macOS, and Linux. Players explore a nature sanctuary alone or cooperatively, photographing birds to complete a guidebook and earning money for equipment and cosmetic items.

== Gameplay ==
Flock Around can be played alone or cooperatively online with up to ten players. Players explore Goose Lake Sanctuary, searching for birds across several biomes and photographing them with a camera. The birds are based on species found in the Pacific Northwest.

Each entry in the guidebook requires photographs of a bird in several poses, including from the front, back and side and while in flight. Birds can fly away if players approach too closely or make too much noise through proximity chat. Completing guidebook entries allows further areas of the sanctuary to be accessed.

Photographs can be developed for in-game money, with their value affected by the quality of the photograph. Money can be spent on camera and binocular upgrades, bird seed, and clothing. Players can customise their birder's colour, facial features, and clothing.

== Development and release ==
Flock Around was developed by Friend Shaped Games (previously known as Secret Plan Games), a studio based in Victoria, British Columbia.

In February 2026, Outersloth joined the project as a publisher. Its funding was intended in part to support additional maps and regions after release. In April, the studio received CA$50,000 from Creative BC's Video Games Early Stage Growth Program, one of six British Columbia studios to receive funding through the program.

A playable demo was released on Steam before launch. The full game was released on Steam on 24 April 2026. A paid supporter pack containing cosmetic items was released on the same day.

Two paid map expansions followed later in 2026. Emu Island, released on 16 July, added an Australian setting with three biomes and 40 bird species. Cardinal Cove, released on 11 September, added three biomes based on the east coast of North America and another 40 birds.

== Reception ==
Preview coverage frequently compared Flock Around with Pokémon Snap. Lincoln Carpenter of PC Gamer described the demo as a multiplayer photography game that applied a cooperative structure to birdwatching, and wrote about the process of photographing and earning money from birds. Kara Phillips, also writing for PC Gamer, found that the birds remained recognisable from their appearances and calls despite the game's cartoon presentation. She also described locating some species and obtaining the required poses as challenging, particularly when playing with others whose proximity-chat noise could scare birds away.

After release, Riley MacLeod of Aftermath wrote that the game reproduced aspects of birdwatching such as spotting birds, approaching them carefully, framing photographs, patience, and timing. MacLeod described solo play as meditative and said that the photograph-rating system encouraged closer observation of the birds. Giovanni Colantonio of Polygon similarly compared the game with Pokémon Snap, describing it as a cooperative birdwatching game that could also be played alone.
