= Birders (film) =

2019 documentary film

- Film poster
- Directed by: Otilia Portillo Padua
- Produced by: Gael García Bernal
- Distributed by: Netflix
- Release date: September 25, 2019
- Running time: 37 minutes
- Countries: United States, Mexico
- Languages: English, Spanish

Birders is a 2019 US-Mexican short documentary film directed by Otilia Portillo Padua and executive produced by Gael García Bernal. The film depicts birdwatchers on both sides of the border of US and Mexico, and how migrant birds travel back and forth over the border each year.

The documentary was released on Netflix on September 25, 2019.
