= Project FeederWatch =

Citizen science project in ornithology

Project FeederWatch is a North American citizen science project in ornithology supported by the Cornell Lab of Ornithology and Birds Canada. The FeederWatch season begins November 1 and runs through April 30. Participants count birds that visit backyards, community areas, and other locales, with bird feeders often used but not required for participation. Data is submitted online at the Project FeederWatch website or through its mobile app.

== Overview ==
Participants record the highest number of birds of each species seen at their count sight at one time over a two-day period, up to once a week. Collected data is used by Cornell to analyze changes of bird populations throughout winter. Participants may also choose to record supplementary data such as signs of disease and behavioral interactions between birds. The project was conceived by Erica Dunn in Canada and was originally called the Ontario Bird Feeder Survey, which began in 1976 and was conducted at Long Point Bird Observatory before growing over the following decade and stretching across North America. Since its establishment in 1986 under the name FeederWatch, the project has grown to include over 25,000 participants annually, with about 180,000 individual counts submitted yearly according to data collected in 2020.

== Impact ==
FeederWatch, as a citizen science project, allows for the collection of vast amounts of data that would otherwise be highly costly and/or impossible for individual scientists to collect. Collected datasets are made available on the FeederWatch website, which also publishes state-and-province bird summaries, trend graphs, and year-end reports. Because the same counting protocol has been used since 1986, it is possible to accurately compare data gathered across the years and see how it has changed over time. As of 2025, over 40 scientific papers utilizing FeederWatch data have been published, covering topics like bird behavior, distribution, disease, and effects of climate conditions and change. Researchers at FeederWatch also use collected data to understand how bird feeding impacts people and how people impact birds via feeding.

A tangible impact from FeederWatch data reporting can be seen in painted bunting management in Florida. FeederWatch data showed a decline in the painted bunting population in Florida, a trend which Cornell reported to the Florida Fish and Wildlife Conservation Committee. The Committee began monitoring Florida's painted buntings to determine what factors were impacting their population.

FeederWatch participants as a whole are not representative of the population of people who feed birds, nor of the general population of the United States, with FeederWatch participants skewing whiter, older, more affluent, and more female-dominated than the general population. There has been internal research and discussion on how to make the project more inclusive, with an example given of providing Spanish language support, which as of May 2026 has not yet been implemented; Project FeederWatch material is currently available in English and French. Research further shows that financial barriers such as the yearly participation fee and the cost of bird food, accessibility barriers such as the requirement to record only birds that participants can visually see, and cultural barriers including an often insular-feeling scientific community, the general perception of birding as a "white man activity," and language barriers may all serve to limit the participation of BIPOC and disabled birders in the project.
