= Life list =

Birdwatching term

A life list, or life-list, is a list of all biological species seen by a person. The action of tracking which biological species one has observed is known as lifelisting. The phrase is particularly common among bird watchers and fishermen, though it can be applied to many animal types. Those who compile life lists may compete with each other to have the largest list with the most unique species.

Lifelisting can take many forms, as it is up to each individual what they "count" for their list and what they don't. Some birders will only count birds they see, while others might take a vocalization as evidence enough to add the species to their lifelist. In other cases, a birder might be in a group of people bird watching when only one person sees and identifies the bird, and the others may choose whether or not to add it to their list.

== Birding ==
There is some controversy surrounding the concept. As there is no way to prove one has seen every bird they claim to, the entire concept relies on the honor system. Some people may add birds they have "seen" on the internet or in film to life lists, though this is generally discouraged.

Some birders may hope to see every species of bird on earth. As bird species and entire taxa are reclassified, this goal becomes more challenging. For example, if a single species is reclassified as two distinct ones, or vice versa, this can retroactively affect a completed list. The first person to record over 8,000 species was birder Phoebe Snetsinger; due to the reclassification of taxa, her record has been revised to 8,398.

Electronic resources have made the keeping of life lists easier in the 21st century. The website eBird is a database in which users can report their bird sightings as well as upload photos and audio recording captured in the field. eBird will maintain a life list automatically, and users may also view lists of all of the species they have observed in specific regions and time periods. A user's profile will show the number of species they have seen. iNaturalist is a similar site where users can upload sightings and media, though unlike eBird, it allows a user to log many different animal and plant groups, as opposed to just birds.

== Other animals ==
Lifelists in fishing are more complicated compared to those in birding. Since there are so many methods of fishing as opposed to the relative simplicity of birding, fishermen disagree what "counts" for their lifelist and what doesn't. Some fishermen will only count fish species that they caught on hook and line, where the hook is fair, and the fish visibly took the bait. Others are less strict, and some naturalists will even keep a lifelist with dipnets, or seines. The most popular form of lifelisting when it comes to fishing is called microfishing, where fishermen will use small hooks on rods lacking reels, targeting small species entirely by sight, often at night. This is particularly effective at building a large lifelist because there are a much greater number of species available to catch when you can target small fishes rather than just large game fish.

Other species that may be lifelisted include primates, fungi, plants, and insects.

== See also ==
- Big year
