= The Big Year =

2011 American film directed by David Frankel

- Theatrical release poster
- Directed by: David Frankel
- Written by: Howard Franklin
- Based on: The Big Year: A Tale of Man, Nature and Fowl Obsession by Mark Obmascik
- Produced by: Karen Rosenfelt; Stuart Cornfeld; Curtis Hanson
- Starring: Steve Martin; Jack Black; Owen Wilson; Brian Dennehy; Anjelica Huston; Rashida Jones; Dianne Wiest; JoBeth Williams
- Cinematography: Lawrence Sher
- Edited by: Mark Livolsi
- Music by: Theodore Shapiro
- Production companies: Red Hour Films; Deuce Three; Ingenious Media; Sunswept Entertainment; Dune Entertainment
- Distributed by: 20th Century Fox
- Release date: October 14, 2011
- Running time: 100 minutes
- Country: United States
- Language: English
- Budget: $41 million
- Box office: $7.4 million

The Big Year is a 2011 American observational comedy film starring Steve Martin, Jack Black and Owen Wilson, directed by David Frankel and written by Howard Franklin. The film is based on the 2004 non-fiction book The Big Year: A Tale of Man, Nature and Fowl Obsession by Mark Obmascik. The book follows three men on a quest for a Big Year – a competition among birders to see who can spot and identify the greatest number of bird species in North America (north of Mexico) in a calendar year. The three actual birders were Sandy Komito, Al Levantin, and Greg Miller, who were chasing Komito's prior record. The film uses the same premise with fictional characters.

Filming for The Big Year took place from May to July 2010. The film was released by 20th Century Fox on October 14, 2011, in the United States. The Big Year received generally mixed reviews, although the three leads' performances were praised. However, it was a box office bomb, only grossing $7.4 million worldwide against a $41 million budget.

== Plot ==
There are three seasoned birders who each set out to achieve a Big Year: Brad Harris, a 36-year-old computer programmer based in Baltimore; Stu Preissler, founder and CEO of a New York company bearing his name; and roofing contractor Kenny Bostick, who holds the current Big Year record of 732 birds.

Bostick is obsessively possessive of his record, but his third wife Jessica is concerned; this was supposed to be the year they focused on conceiving a child. She also believes that Bostick's birding obsession is what destroyed his two previous marriages. He is so competitive that the others use his name as a kind of expletive: "Bostick!" Brad is a skilled birder who can identify nearly any species solely by sound, and hates his job maintaining the operational software of a nuclear power plant in Lansdowne, Pennsylvania. Living with his parents after a failed marriage, an aborted career at Dell, and dropping out of grad school, he hopes that doing a Big Year will give him a sense of purpose and possibly even make his father proud of him.

Stu, the founder and chief executive officer of a Manhattan-based chemical conglomerate originally established in a garage, is preparing to retire to Colorado with his spouse. Due to ongoing, complex merger negotiations with a competitor, his designated successors frequently summon him to New York for consultations. Simultaneously, he is pursuing a "Big Year" birding expedition with his wife's support..

The movie portrays various incidents that take place during the Big Year event, while the trio compete with each other and many other birders to achieve the world record of sighting the highest number of birds. Brad and Stu become friends and help each other in the competition, and Brad is attracted to a fellow birder, Ellie. Meanwhile, the highly competitive Bostick resorts to dirty tricks to boost his own count while undermining the others.

As the year draws to a close, Stu is happily retired and enjoying his newborn grandson; Brad develops a relationship with Ellie; and Bostick is alone, as his wife has left him. Stu and Brad, now close friends, congratulate each other on "a very big year", after each sighting 700+ bird species that year. When the Big Year results are published, Bostick won the competition with 755, a new record; Brad came in second; Stu was fourth. Brad opines that "he (Bostick) got more birds, but we got more everything," as he looks at Ellie, who has come for a weekend visit. Stu smiles, looking at his wife.

The film ends with Brad and Ellie birding together on a rocky coastline, while Brad confesses that birding is no longer the biggest part of his life. Stu is hiking with his toddler grandson (already enamored by birds) in the Rockies. Bostick is on a birding adventure in China, alone and gazing wistfully at a happy couple walking with their newborn child.

== Cast ==
- Steve Martin as Stu Preissler
- Jack Black as Brad Harris
- Owen Wilson as Kenny Bostick
- Rashida Jones as Ellie
- Anjelica Huston as Annie Auklet
- Jim Parsons as Crane
- Rosamund Pike as Jessica
- JoBeth Williams as Edith
- Brian Dennehy as Raymond
- Dianne Wiest as Brenda
- Anthony Anderson as Bill Clemont
- Tim Blake Nelson as Phil
- Joel McHale as Barry Loomis
- Calum Worthy as Colin Debs
- Veena Sood as Nurse Katie
- Corbin Bernsen as Gil Gordon
- Stacey Scowley as Vicki
- Jesse Moss as Darren
- Kevin Pollak as Jim Gittelson
- Barry Shabaka Henley as Dr. Neil Kramer
- Andrew Wilson as Mike Shin
- Al Roker as New York weatherman
- John Cleese as narrator
- June Squibb as the Old Lady
- Steven Weber as Rick

== Production ==
Dustin Hoffman was initially attached for the role of Stu.

Principal photography was done from May 3 to July 30, 2010, in Vancouver. Additional Attu Island scenes were shot in the Yukon. Jack Black's fall on Attu Island was unscripted.

== Reception ==
=== Box office ===
The film was a box office failure, despite the established stars like Martin, Jack Black and Owen Wilson as the leads. Based on a budget of $41 million, it took in just $7.4 million in ticket sales worldwide according to Box Office Mojo.

=== Critical response ===
The film received mixed reviews from critics. It holds a 41% rating on Rotten Tomatoes based on 100 reviews, with an average rating of 5.1/10. The consensus reads: "Though made with care and affection for its characters, The Big Year plods along, rarely reaching any comedic heights." The Hollywood Reporter described it as a "genial, amusing and somewhat unfathomable" film; the Pittsburgh Post-Gazette called it a "gentle, light-hearted comedy" about "people trying to be the best, following their dreams and enjoying the wonder of birds". CinemaScore polls reported that the average grade moviegoers gave the film was a "B−" on an A+ to F scale.

== Home media ==
20th Century Fox Home Entertainment released the film on DVD on January 31, 2012, with Fox later releasing it on Blu-ray on June 7, 2016. On March 20, 2019, Rupert Murdoch sold most of 21st Century Fox's film and television assets to The Walt Disney Company, and The Big Year was one of the films included in the deal. It was later made available on Disney's streaming service Disney+.

== Songs ==
| Song | Writer | Performer |
|---|---|---|
| Minor Swing | Stéphane Grappelli and Jean Reinhardt | Django Reinhardt |
| (If I Had) A Sandwich With You | Dan DiPrima and Alex Marlowe | Zombie Bank |
| Wheel of Fortune Underscore | courtesy of Sony Pictures | |
| The Devil Never Sleeps | Sam Beam | Iron & Wine |
| Pitkin County Turnaround | Steve Martin | Steve Martin |
| Let It Shine | Jeremy Fisher | Jeremy Fisher |
| I'll Have the Halibut | Dan DiPrima and Alex Marlowe | Zombie Bank |
| Away With Pie | Dan DiPrima and Alex Marlowe | Zombie Bank |
| The Dog's Decree - Concerto in C Major | Antonio Vivaldi | Alexandre Desplat |
| Viva la Vida | William Champion, Christopher Martin, Guy Berryman, & Jonathan Buckland | Coldplay |
| Come Fly Away | Jeremy Fisher and Jack Livesey | Jeremy Fisher |
| Surfin' Bird | Alfred Frazier, John Harris, Turner Wilson Jr., and Carl White | The Trashmen |
| Blackbird | John Lennon and Paul McCartney | Brad Mehldau |
| I Like Birds | E | Eels |
| Adeste Fideles | Traditional, Arranged by Virginia S. Davidson | New York Treble Singers |
| Silent Night | Franz Xaver Gruber, Joseph Mohr and John Freeman Young | Bing Crosby |
| This Could All Be Yours | Ryan Miller, Adam Gardner, Brian Rosenworcel and Joe Pisapia | Guster |
| Auld Lang Syne | Traditional, Arranged by Guy Lombardo | Guy Lombardo and His Royal Canadians |

^{Soundtrack references:}

== See also ==
- List of birdwatchers
