= Pish =

Imitated bird call

A pish is an imitated bird call (usually a scold or alarm call) used by birders and ornithologists to attract birds (generally passerines). The action of making the sound is known as pishing or spishing. This technique is used by scientists to increase the effectiveness of bird diversity surveys, and by birders to attract species that they might not otherwise see.

Pishing is used most effectively in the Holarctic, where it is thought to work due to its similarity to the scold calls of tits and chickadees (birds in the family Paridae). These scold calls, a form of mobbing behaviour, attract other birds which come in to establish the nature of the potential threat. Acoustical analysis of pishing calls and the mobbing calls of tits shows that they share a frequency metric not used by other birds. Not surprisingly, pishing has little effect on birds in those parts of the world without tits or chickadees.

Another study noted that only passerines are attracted by pishing. Apart from the mobbing call hypothesis, it has also been suggested that pishing may be treated as an invitation to join a "mixed-species foraging flock" and birds do not themselves vocalize or show aggressive behaviour. The same study noted that pishing did not work in the old-world tropics and suggested that it may be due to the lower densities of migrants.

Pishing has also been found to work effectively in Southern Africa (imitating a call of the rattling cisticola). It also works effectively in Australia where, despite the absence of any members of the Paridae, a number of passerine species can be attracted. Some birders in Australia use a variant of pishing called "squeaking" (making a kissing sound through pursed lips or against the back of one's hand) to which white-eared honeyeaters, several species of whistlers and grey fantails show an initial response and in turn attract other species.

Because pishing or squeaking disrupts the natural behaviour of a bird, birding organisations consider it unethical to make excessive use of this method of attracting birds. Such organisations recommend that, once the bird has been viewed, the birder cease pishing and allow the bird to return to its natural behaviour.
