= Noah Strycker =

American birdwatcher (born 1986)

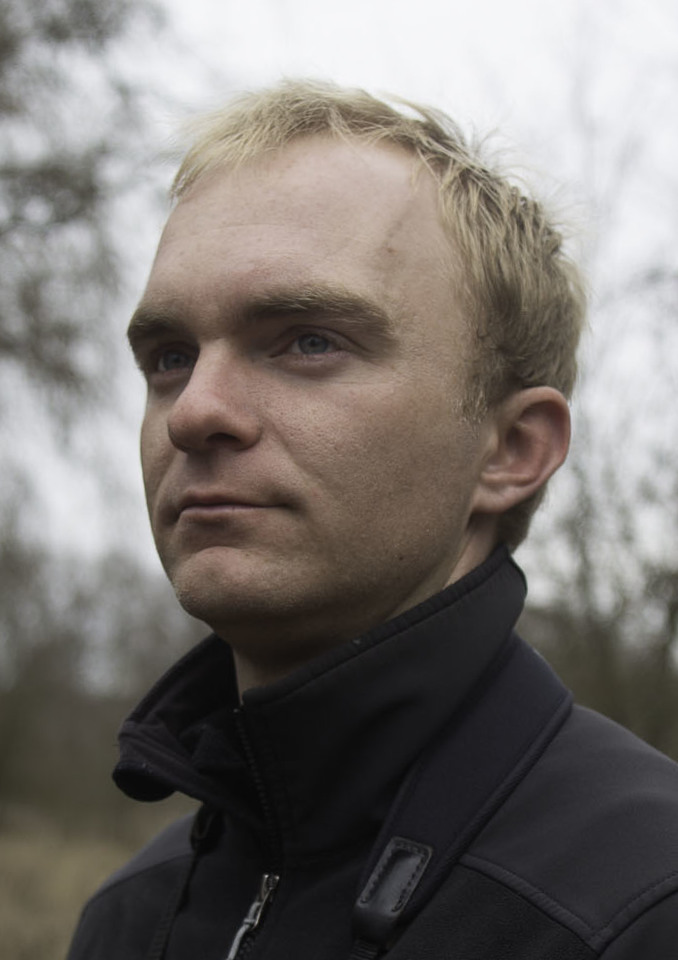
- Noah Strycker, in 2014
- Born: February 9, 1986 (age 40); Eugene, Oregon, U.S.

Noah Keefer Strycker (born February 9, 1986) is an American birdwatcher. In 2015, he set a record for a worldwide big year of birding, seeing 6,042 of the world's estimated 10,365 bird species at the time (58.3%), becoming the first person to record half of the world's birds in one year. His journey spanned 41 countries and all seven continents from January 1 to December 31, 2015.

== Background ==
Born in Eugene, Oregon, he grew up on rural property in the forest outside the small town of Creswell, Oregon. There he watched and photographed birds, learned their habits and calls, and taught himself to find their nests. He is the son of Bob Keefer, an arts writer and photographer, and Lisa Strycker, a data analyst and former journalist.

From 2005 to 2010, he wrote a column titled "Birdboy" for WildBird magazine. He has been Associate Editor of Birding magazine, the flagship publication of the American Birding Association, since 2006.

He graduated magna cum laude in 2008 from Oregon State University with a degree in fisheries and wildlife and a minor in art, and summa cum laude in 2021 from Stony Brook University with a degree in marine sciences. He has studied and observed birds around the world.

In 2011, he solo hiked the entire 2,650-mile Pacific Crest Trail from Mexico to Canada.

== Research ==
Noah's master's research at Stony Brook University focused on population abundance and distribution of Adélie, Gentoo, and Chinstrap Penguins, to better understand the dynamics of ecological change on the Antarctic Peninsula. He is the first author on two peer-reviewed papers on chinstrap penguins: A Global Population Assessment of the Chinstrap Penguin published in Scientific Reports, and Fifty-Year Change in Penguin Abundance on Elephant Island, South Shetland Islands, Antarctica: Results of the 2019-20 Census published in Polar Biology.

== Books ==
In 2011, Strycker's first book, "Among Penguins: A Bird Man in Antarctica," was published by Oregon State University Press. It is a first-person account of a 10-week field job he worked in a remote field camp at Cape Crozier in Antarctica.

His second book, "The Thing With Feathers: The Surprising Lives of Birds and What they Reveal about Being Human," was published in 2014 by Riverhead Books. It explores the behaviors of different bird species, with connections to human behavior.

Strycker's third book, "Birding Without Borders: An Obsession, a Quest and the Biggest Year in the World" is about his Big Year journey in 2015. It came out in October 2017 from Houghton Mifflin Harcourt.

"Birds of the Photo Ark," a collaboration with photographer Joel Sartore, came out in March 2018 from National Geographic. It features essays by Strycker about birds photographed in captivity by Sartore as part of his Photo Ark project.

In 2019 the "Backyard Guide to the Birds of North America" came out from National Geographic. Co-authored by Strycker and by Jonathan Alderfer, it's a completely revised second edition of a field guide to 150 of the most common and interesting birds in North America.

In November 2022, National Geographic will release Strycker's “National Geographic Birding Basics: Tips, Tools, and Techniques for Great Bird-watching,” an inspiring guide to the art, craft, and science of bird-watching.

In February 2023, National Geographic plans to issue “Birder’s Life List and Journal,” a personal record for noting dates and locations of birds observed, with Strycker contributing occasional text.

== The Big Year ==
Strycker began his worldwide Big Year on January 1, 2015, in Antarctica, aboard the Akademik Ioffe, a former Soviet research vessel then leased by One Ocean Expeditions for adventure tourism. The first bird he saw of the year was a Cape petrel, near Spert Island. From there he traveled up the South and North American continents, across to Europe, throughout Africa, and into Asia and Australia. The trip took him to 41 countries and all seven continents, and was done entirely with a 40-Liter backpack.

On September 16, 2015, near Thattekad, India, he saw a pair of Sri Lanka frogmouths, his 4,342nd bird species of the year, which topped the previous world Big Year record set in 2008 by British birders Alan Davies and Ruth Miller. His final species of the year was a group of silver-breasted broadbills seen on a return to India, in Assam, putting him at the record breaking total of 6,042 species. This record was broken in 2016 by Arjan Dwarshuis.

Strycker wrote a book about the adventure for Houghton Mifflin Harcourt.
