= Cornell Lab of Ornithology =

U.S. biological research institute

Coordinates: 42.4800°N 76.4511°W

- Type: Research and conservation institute
- Established: 1915
- Parent institution: Cornell University
- Location: Ithaca, New York, U.S.
- Website: birds.cornell.edu

The Cornell Lab of Ornithology is a member-supported unit of Cornell University in Ithaca, New York, which studies birds and other wildlife. It is housed in the Imogene Powers Johnson Center for Birds and Biodiversity in Sapsucker Woods Sanctuary. Approximately 250 scientists, professors, staff, and students work in a variety of programs devoted to the Lab's mission: interpreting and conserving the Earth's biological diversity through research, education, and citizen science focused on birds. Work at the Lab is supported primarily by its 200,000 members and supporters.

The Cornell Lab produces a quarterly publication, Living Bird magazine, and an electronic newsletter delivered twice per month. It manages numerous participatory science projects and websites, including the Webby Award-winning All About Birds.

== History ==
The Cornell Lab of Ornithology was founded by Arthur A. Allen, who had lobbied for the creation of the country's first graduate program in ornithology; the Lab was established at Cornell University in 1915. Initially, the Lab of Ornithology was housed in the university’s entomology and limnology department.

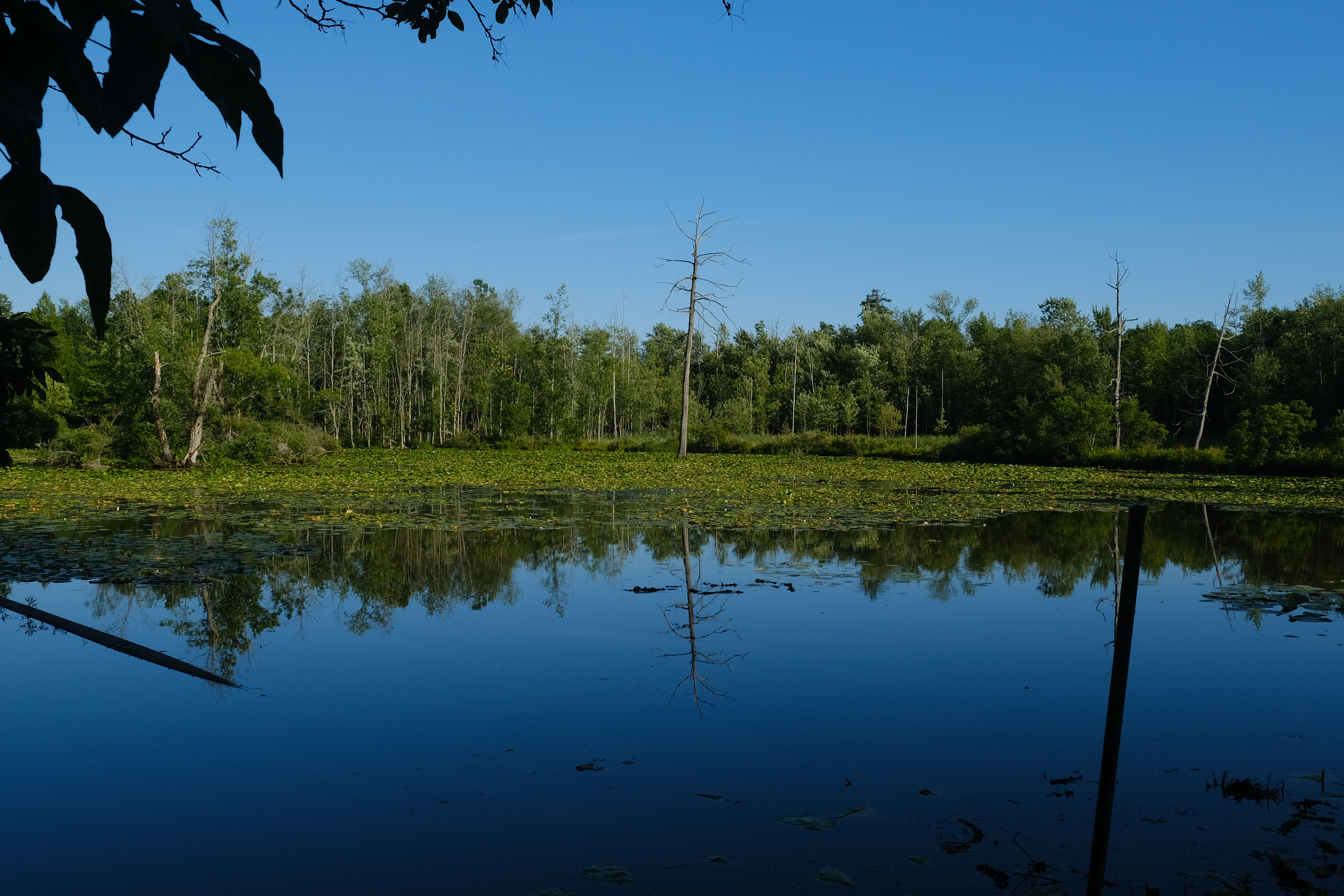
Sapsucker Woods

Birders and businessmen Lyman Stuart, Walter C. and Katharine Z. Heasley, donors, and landowners purchased or donated farmland in 1954, which was to be set aside for the sanctuary. Stuart helped finance the construction of the first Lab building in 1957. Lab founder Arthur Allen (along with colleagues Louis Agassiz Fuertes, James Gutsell, and Francis Harper) had dubbed the area “Sapsucker Woods” after discovering the first breeding pair of yellow-bellied sapsuckers ever reported in the Cayuga Lake Basin; this species of woodpecker is now common in the area and is part of the Cornell Lab's logo.

In addition to Allen, others who have been Director (now Louis Agassiz Fuertes Director) of the lab have included Peter Paul Kellogg, Olin Sewall Pettingill Jr. (1960–1973), Charles Walcott (1981–1995), John W. Fitzpatrick (1995–2021), and Ian Owens (2021–).

== Facilities ==
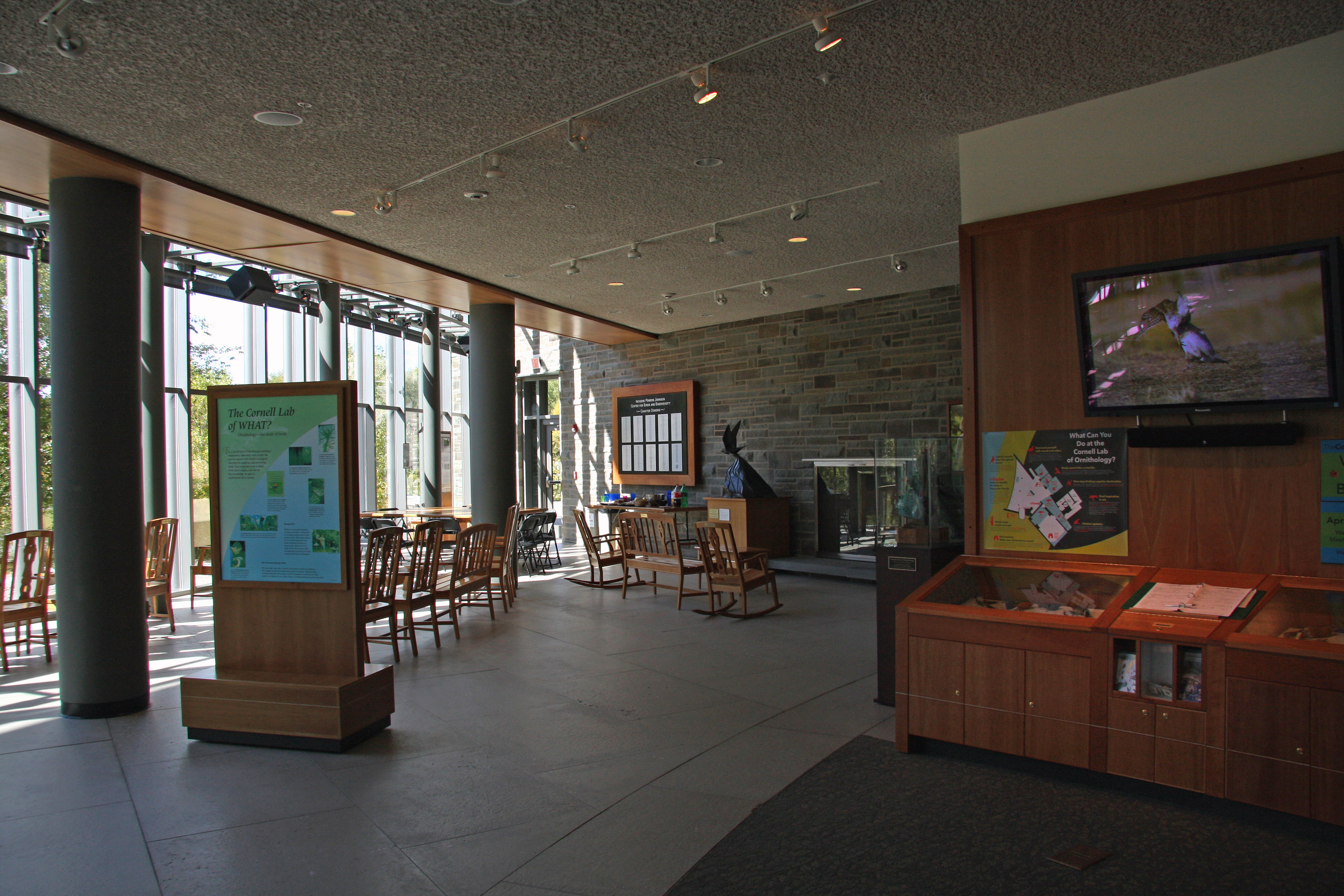
The Visitor Center entrance hall prior to the 2024 refurbishment, with the observatory on the left

The Cornell Lab of Ornithology is housed in the Imogene Powers Johnson Center for Birds and Biodiversity, which opened in the summer of 2003. It is approximately 4 miles from the Cornell University campus. Previously, it was located within the Lyman K. Stuart Observatory, near the current Visitor Center.

The 300-acre Sapsucker Woods Sanctuary contains more than 5 miles of trails winding around Sapsucker Pond, on boardwalks, through wetlands and forest. More than 230 species of birds have been recorded in the sanctuary. Approximately 55,000 people visit the sanctuary and public areas of the Cornell Lab each year.

In fall 2023, the Visitor Center underwent an extensive refurbishment. It reopened in June 2024 with new interactive exhibits.

== Organization ==
The Cornell Lab of Ornithology is a nonprofit organization within Cornell University's College of Agriculture and Life Sciences. It has a separate 30-member Administrative Board that is appointed by the Cornell Board of Trustees. As of fiscal year 2025, 75% of the lab's revenue, totaling 51.5 million dollars, came from sponsors and members. It has 18 senior staff, which includes eight holding Cornell faculty appointments.

== Participatory science ==
Collecting the observations of everyday birders for scientific use is a hallmark of the Lab. Birdwatchers of varying ages and skill levels help gather data about the distribution and abundance of birds. Hundreds of thousands of people worldwide participate in the Lab's projects in the Center for Engagement in Science and Nature. The eBird project allows birders to report any of the Earth's more than 10,585 bird species to their scientific database. As of July 2024, 127.5 million checklists have been recorded, reporting 10,826 species, from more than a million eBirders. eBird data and other tools have formed the foundation for hundreds of scientific studies on birds.

The Cornell Lab's other participatory-science projects take place in all seasons and include Project FeederWatch, NestWatch, and Celebrate Urban Birds. Every February, the Lab, the Audubon Society, and Birds Canada host the 4-day Great Backyard Bird Count which takes place all over the world. The Cornell Lab also operates many Bird Cams which stream live video of nesting birds in the spring.

== Education ==
The Lab's Bird Academy and curricula take education about birds and nature to students of all ages. Bird Academy is home to a series of self-paced online courses about woodpeckers, hummingbirds, how to paint birds, photograph birds, improve bird ID skills, and much more. K–12 materials are aimed at both students and teachers, assisting them in teaching and learning how to think like a scientist.

== Merlin Bird ID ==
The Cornell Lab publishes the free Merlin Bird ID app for iOS and Android devices. This field guide and identification app guides helps users to put a name to the birds they see, and covers 3,000 species of across the Americas, Western Europe, and India. In addition to browsing customized lists of birds for any location in the world, users can answer simple questions to get a list of most likely species, along with images and sound. In 2017, Merlin Bird ID was updated to include AI-powered automatic photo recognition, which allows quick identification help with photographs. Bird ID and Photo ID require separate file downloads. The app also offers Sound ID, which can identify some 450 North American species, in real time or from an in-app recording, even if multiple species are communicating at once. The app also displays a basic black-and-white spectrogram—a visual representation of sound. To test your knowledge of bird species, the Cornell Lab offers custom quizzing through BirdWise, which tests identification of over 640 species of birds throughout the United States and Canada. As of 2025, the Merlin Bird ID app has 10 million users.

== Project FeederWatch ==
The Cornell Lab's Project FeederWatch is a database for monitoring bird species. The information is collected from participants across North America, who count bird species seen at their feeders or in their communities. It focuses on populations of bird species in the winter, and scientists at the Cornell Lab take that information to create population maps. This information is used to study bird population biology, trends of increasing or decreasing population numbers across the continent, and potential clues for scientists as to why these changes are happening.

== Research ==
Cornell Lab scientists, postdoctoral associates, students, and visiting scholars are carrying on much original research in behavioral ecology, conservation, education, evolutionary biology, information systems, and population genetics. The scientists even harness weather radar data to study the movements of birds during migration. Cornell Lab engineers also develop hardware and software tools used in researching bird and animal communication and patterns of movement.

In the Center for Biodiversity Studies & Higher Education, laboratory researchers are extracting DNA from living birds or specimens to uncover the relationships among species.

In addition to many studies and published papers, the Cornell Lab's Center for Avian Population Studies has produced land managers' guides aimed at conserving dwindling populations of scarlet tanagers, wood thrushes, and other forest birds. The Lab worked with Partners in Flight to identify rapidly declining species and produce the first North American Landbird Conservation Plan. Lab staff also worked with multiple partners to create the first-ever State of the Birds report in March 2009, and subsequent years.

Lab scientists are currently involved with partners from industry, government agencies, and non-governmental organizations in setting research priorities to better understand the impact of wind power facilities on birds and bats on land, and on whales and marine creatures offshore.

== Bioacoustics ==
The Lab's K. Lisa Yang Center for Conservation Bioacoustics creates remote recording devices used by researchers in projects around the world. These mobile autonomous vehicles consist of a hard drive, housing, and microphone array that can be mounted in a forest or anchored to the ocean floor. These recording units have been used in the Yang Center's Elephant Listening Project in Africa, studies of whales, and in many studies of birds such as northern spotted owls.

The Yang Center has also developed sound-analysis software programs called Raven and Raven Lite. Engineers are working on programmable radio tags to track birds and other animals for longer periods of time and to follow bird migrations.

== Media ==
From its earliest days, the Cornell Lab has had a special interest in bird and animal sounds. Founder Arthur Allen and his students were pioneers in the field, recording the first bird songs on a film soundtrack.

The Macaulay Library has since expanded and is now the world's premier scientific archive of natural history audio, video, and photographs. The library hosts over 64 million audio, video and photographs. Macaulay Library archivists continue to mount expeditions to collect wildlife sounds, images, and video from around the world and collect media from contributors to expand the archive.

The Lab's Center for Conservation Media presents stories from around the world, working with many partners to highlight conservation concerns ranging from the preservation of important habitats to individual species in trouble such as the great Philippine eagle and the African grey parrot.

== Cornell University Museum of Vertebrates ==
The Cornell University Museum of Vertebrates is also housed in the Johnson Center and holds 1,230,000 specimens of fish, 44,300 amphibians and reptiles, 45,000 birds, 3,200 eggs, and 15,000 mammals, some now extinct. Students and scientists use the collections in their studies.
