= Big year =

Birdwatching personal challenge or competition

A big year is a personal challenge or an informal competition among birders who attempt to identify as many species of birds as possible by sight or sound, within a single calendar year.

== History of North American big years ==
The wide publication in 1934 of the first modern field guide by Roger Tory Peterson truly revolutionized birding. However, in that era, most birders did not travel widely. The earliest known continent-wide Big Year record was compiled by Guy Emerson, a traveling businessman, who timed his business trips to coincide with the best birding seasons for different areas in North America. During his best year, in 1939, he saw 497 species. In 1952, Emerson's record was broken by Bob Smart, who saw 515 species.

In 1953, Roger Tory Peterson and James Fisher took a 30,000 mile road trip visiting the wild places of North America. In 1955, they told the story of their travels in a book and a documentary film, both called Wild America. In a footnote to the book, Peterson claimed "My year's list at the end of 1953 was 572 species." In 1956, a 25-year-old Englishman named Stuart Keith, following Peterson and Fisher's route, compiled a list of 594 species, a record that stood for fifteen years.

In 1971, 18-year-old Ted Parker, in his last semester of high school in southeastern Pennsylvania, extensively birded the eastern seaboard of North America. That September, Parker enrolled in the University of Arizona in Tucson and found dozens of Southwestern U.S. and Pacific coast specialties, ending the year with a list of 626 species.

In 1973, Kenn Kaufman and Floyd Murdoch both pursued Parker's record. As recounted in Kaufman's book Kingbird Highway, both broke the old record by a wide margin. Murdoch finished with 669 in the newly described ABA area to Kaufman's 666. Murdoch's record was broken in 1979 by James M. Vardaman, who saw 699 species that year and travelled 161,332 miles. Benton Basham, in 1983, topped Vardaman's effort with 710 species. 1987 marked the second time that there was a competition during a single year, with Sandy Komito's 722 species topping Steve Perry's 711. In 1992, Bill Rydell made a serious attempt at the record and ended with 714 species for the year.

In 1998, three birders, Sandy Komito, Al Levantin, and Greg Miller, chased Komito's prior record of 722 birds. In the end Komito kept the record, listing 745 species birds plus 3 submitted in 1998 and later accepted by state committees for a revised total of 748. Miller ended up with 715 species, and Levantin with 711. Mark Obmascik's book about the 1998 big year birders was adapted into the 2011 20th Century Fox film The Big Year.

In 2008, Lynn Barber, at the time the Texas big year record holder, became the first woman to break the 700-species barrier with a total of 723.

In 2011, Colorado birder John Vanderpoel became the fastest birder on record to reach 700 species in a year. Ultimately he managed 743 birds, missing out on the record by five, but completing what was, at the time, the 2nd-biggest ABA year ever.

In 2013, Massachusetts birder Neil Hayward reluctantly decided to do an ABA big year. Hayward reached 700 species two weeks ahead of John Vanderpoel's 2011 pace, and ended his year on 747 species plus 3 provisionals.

In October 2016, the ABA voted to add the U.S. state of Hawaii to the countable area for ABA Big Years. All the 2016 big year birders except Hagenlocher birded Hawaii during November and December 2016, even though the "New" ABA checklist was not updated until November 2017. Olaf Danielson, partly due to efforts to promote bird conservation in Hawaii, incorporated Hawaii into his Big Year planning, keeping a list for the "New ABA" along with his Continental ABA list. John Weigel and Laura Keene subsequently birded Hawaii, with Weigel ending up with the highest total for the "New ABA" region (836), the Continental ABA region (784) and the United States (832). Danielson was close behind with 829 for the "New ABA," while setting a new record for the Lower 48 States (723). Weigel was close with 721. Keene broke the previous record for photographed species with diagnostic photos of 792 species, and audio recordings of 10 others, out of her 815 total for the year.

== World big years ==
In 2008, British couple Alan Davies and Ruth Miller traveled around the world, seeing 4,341 species. In 2015, Oregon birder Noah Strycker launched a worldwide big year with the goal of seeing at least 5,000 species—roughly half of the world's species—as he traveled around the globe. On September 16, in India, he broke Davies' and Miller's existing record when he saw a Sri Lanka frogmouth for his 4,342nd species of the year. He finished the year with 6,042 bird species, his last species seen being an Oriental Bay Owl in Assam, India.

Strycker's record faced an immediate challenge in 2016 when Dutch birder Arjan Dwarshuis launched an effort to break it as well as raise money for the BirdLife Preventing Extinctions Programme. On November 4, 2016, Dwarshuis saw a tody motmot in Panama, breaking Strycker's previous record total. He finished the year with 6,852 seen bird species and this is the new World big year record.

Traditional competitive birding have drawn criticism from environmentalists for failing to consider the ecological impact of their travel. Several birders have attempted "green", or alternative big years to raise awareness for both birding and the environment.

Starting in the summer of 2007, teenager Malkolm Boothroyd and his parents, Ken Madsen and Wendy Boothroyd, attempted a big year without the use of fossil fuels by planning to bicycle over 10,000 miles to get over 400 species for the year. They started in their home province of the Yukon Territory, rode down the Pacific Coast, looping back around Arkansas to catch the Texas spring migration, then eastward to Florida. They dubbed this attempt a "bird year," rather than a big year. In the end, they covered more than 13,000 miles by bicycle and tallied 548 species, raising more than $25,000 for bird conservation in the process.

In 2021, Niky Carrera Levy and Mauricio Ossa, a couple of publicists and photographers made the first Big Year in Colombia, the country with the largest number of birds recorded in the world. They managed to record 1,471 species, the highest count of birds in one year in a single country. They traveled the 32 departments of Colombia in 21,974 miles. In addition to counting birds, they carried a message of conservation with the Colombian grebe—the only extinct animal in Colombia—and they got 789 children to take the oath of guardians of the birds.

== See also ==
- World Series of Birding
- List of birdwatchers
- Listers: A Glimpse Into Extreme Birdwatching – 2025 YouTube documentary
