= Birdwatching =

Amateur observation of birds

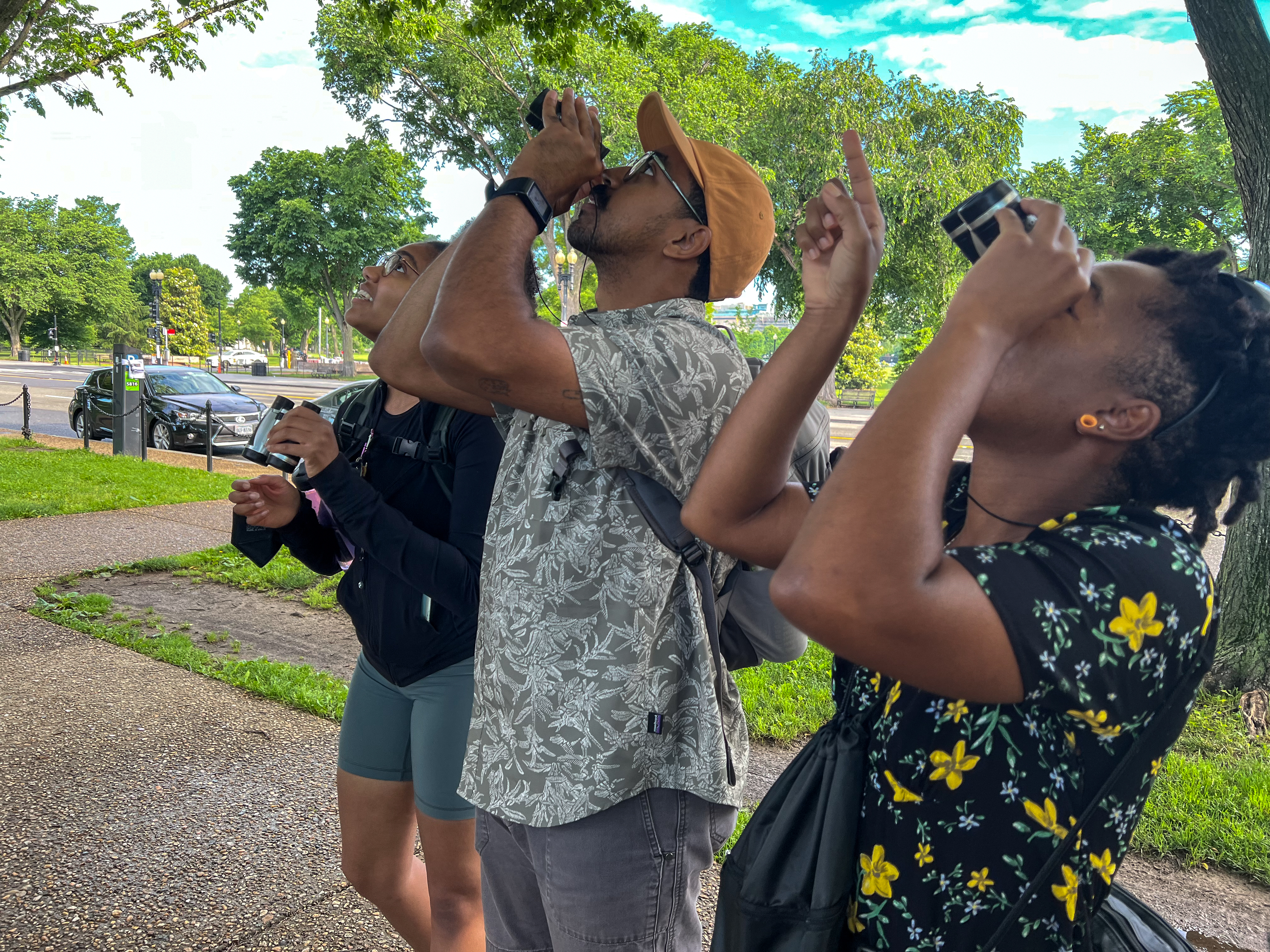
Three people birdwatching with binoculars

Birdwatching, or birding, is the observing of birds, either as a recreational activity or as a form of citizen science. A birdwatcher may observe by using their naked eye, by using a visual enhancement device such as binoculars or a telescope, by listening for bird sounds, watching public webcams, or by viewing smart bird feeder cameras.

Most birdwatchers pursue this activity for recreational or social reasons, unlike ornithologists, who engage in the study of birds using formal scientific methods.

== Birding, birdwatching, and twitching ==
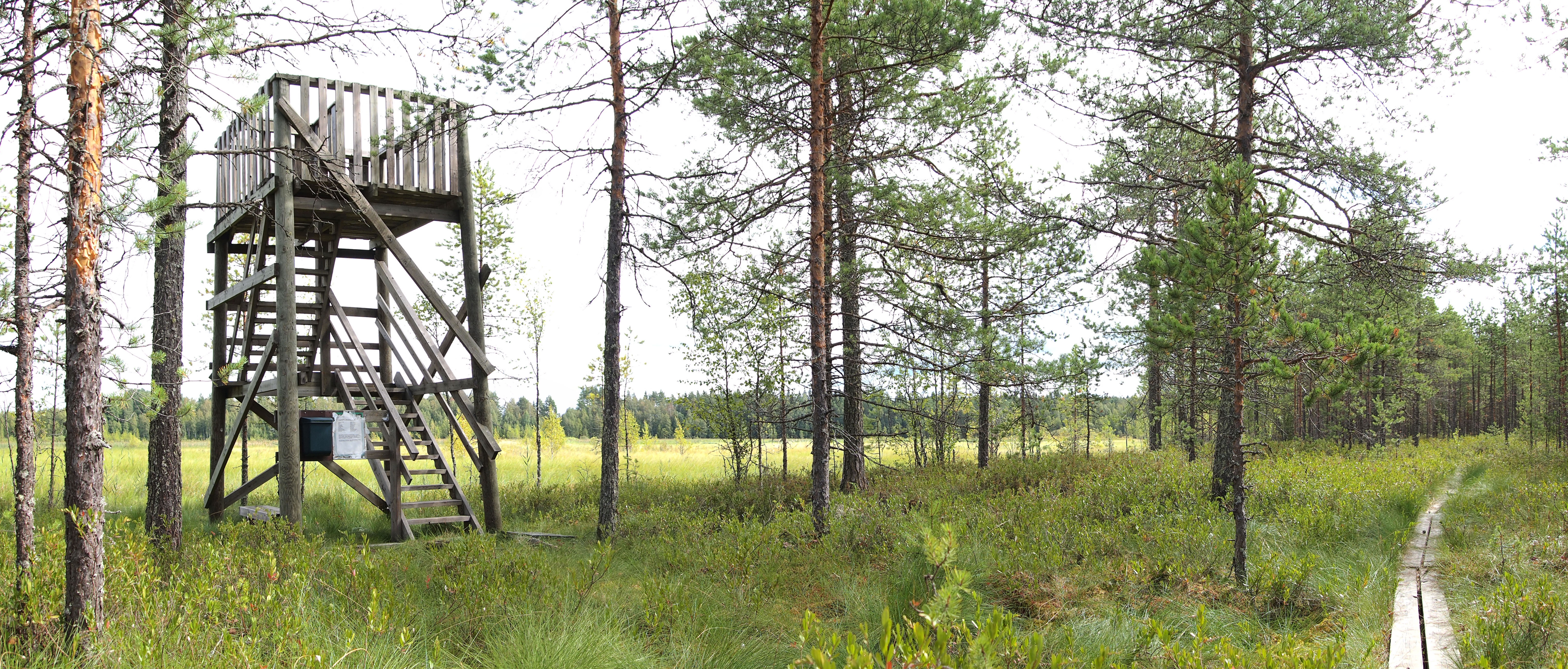
A birdwatching tower in Hankasalmi, Finland

The first recorded use of the term birdwatcher was in 1712 by William Oldsworth. The term birding was also used for the practice of fowling or hunting with firearms as in Shakespeare's The Merry Wives of Windsor (1602): "She laments sir... her husband goes this morning a-birding." The terms birding and birdwatching are today used by some interchangeably, although some participants prefer birding, partly because it includes the auditory aspects of enjoying birds.

In North America, many birders differentiate themselves from birdwatchers, and the term birder is unfamiliar to most lay people. At the most basic level, the distinction is perceived as one of dedication or intensity, though this is a subjective judgment. Generally, self-described birders perceive themselves to be more versed in minutiae such as identification (aural and visual), molt, distribution, migration timing, and habitat usage. Whereas these dedicated birders may often travel specifically in search of birds, birdwatchers have been described by some enthusiasts as having a more limited scope, perhaps not venturing far from their own yards or local parks to view birds. Indeed, in 1969 a Birding Glossary appeared in Birding magazine which gave the following definitions:

Birder. The acceptable term used to describe the person who seriously pursues the hobby of birding. May be professional or amateur.

Birding. A hobby in which individuals enjoy the challenge of bird study, listing, or other general activities involving bird life.

Bird-watcher. A rather ambiguous term used to describe the person who watches birds for any reason at all, and should not be used to refer to the serious birder.

— Birding, Volume 1, No.2

Twitching is a British term used to mean "the pursuit of a previously located rare bird." In North America, it is more often called chasing. The term twitcher, sometimes misapplied as a synonym for birder, is reserved for those who travel long distances to see a rare bird that would then be ticked, or counted on a list. The term originated in the 1950s, when it was used to describe the nervous behaviour of Howard Medhurst, a British birdwatcher. Earlier terms for those who chased rarities were pot-hunter, tally-hunter, or tick-hunter. The main goal of twitching is often to accumulate species on one's lists. Some birders engage in competition to accumulate the longest species list. The act of the pursuit itself is referred to as a twitch or a chase. A rare bird that stays long enough for people to see it is twitchable or chaseable.

Twitching is highly developed in the United Kingdom, the Netherlands, Denmark, Ireland, Finland and Sweden. The size of these countries makes it possible to travel throughout them quickly and with relative ease. The most popular twitches in the UK have drawn large crowds; for example, approximately 2,500 people travelled to Kent, to view a golden-winged warbler (Vermivora chrysoptera), which is native to North America. Twitchers have developed their own vocabulary. For example, a twitcher who fails to see a rare bird has dipped out; if other twitchers do see the bird, they may feel gripped off. Suppression is the act of concealing news of a rare bird from other twitchers.

Many birders maintain a life list, that is, a list of all of the species they have seen in their life, usually with details about the sighting such as date and location. The American Birding Association has specific rules about how a bird species may be documented and recorded in such a list if it is submitted to the ABA; however, the criteria for the personal recording of these lists are very subjective. Some birders "count" species they have identified audibly, while others only record species that they have identified visually. Some also maintain a country list, state list, county list, yard list, year list, or any combination of these.

== History ==
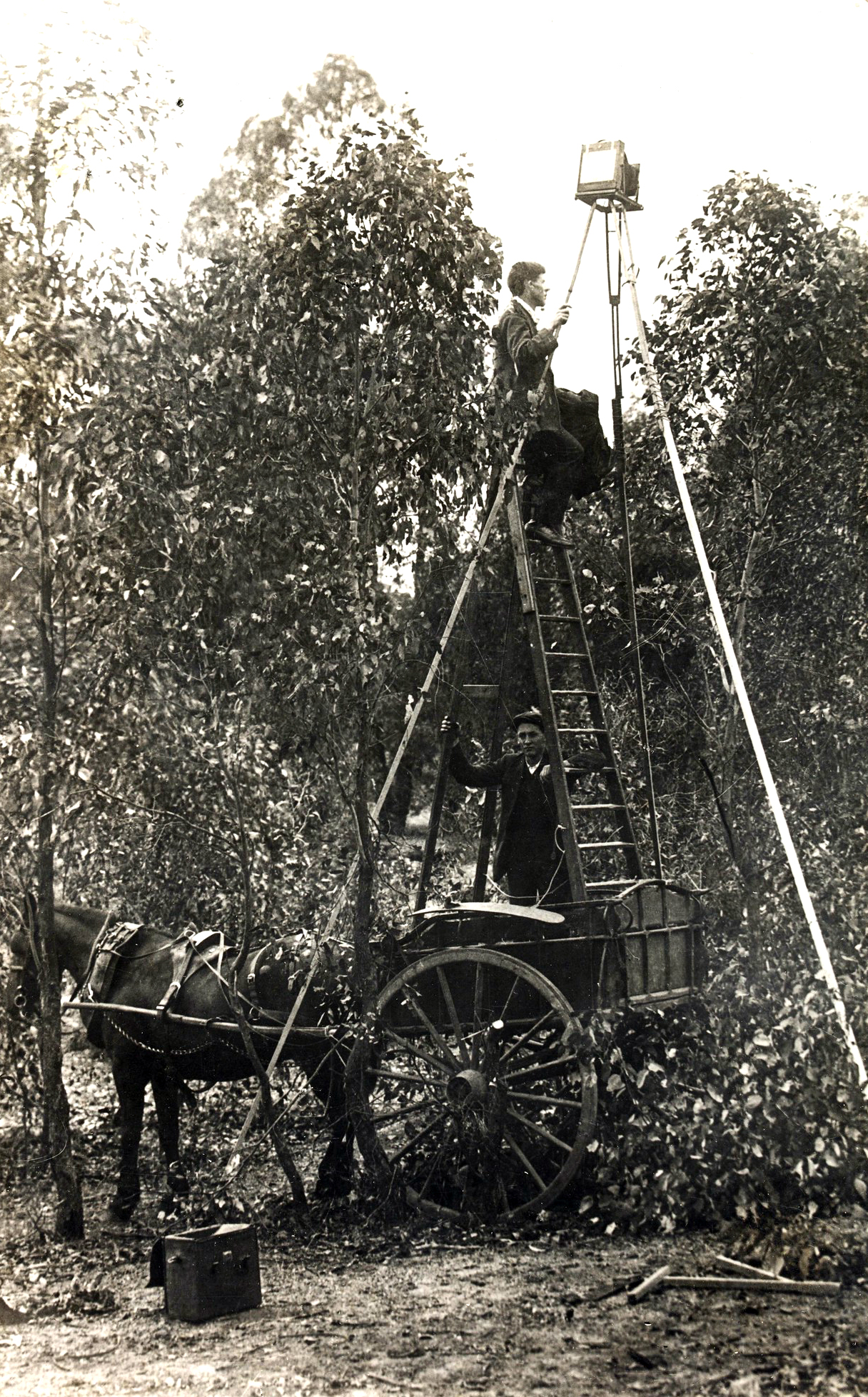
Bird photography, New South Wales, June 1921 (A. H. Chisholm)

The early interest in observing birds for their aesthetic rather than utilitarian (mainly food) value is traced to the late 18th century in the works of Gilbert White, Thomas Bewick, George Montagu and John Clare. The study of birds, and of natural history in general, became increasingly prevalent in Britain during the Victorian Era, often associated with collection, eggs and later skins being the artifacts of interest. Wealthy collectors made use of their contacts in the colonies to obtain specimens from around the world. It was only in the late 19th century that the call for bird protection led to the rising popularity of observation of living birds. The Audubon Society was started to protect birds from the growing trade in feathers in the United States while the Royal Society for the Protection of Birds began in Britain.

The phrase "bird watching" appeared for the first time as the title of the book Bird Watching by Edmund Selous in 1901. In North America, the identification of birds, once thought possible only by shooting, was made possible by the emergence of optics and field identification guides. The earliest field guide in the US was Birds through an Opera Glass (1889) by Florence Bailey.

Birding in North America was focused in the early and mid-20th century on the eastern seaboard region, and was influenced by the works of Ludlow Griscom and later Roger Tory Peterson. Bird Neighbors (1897) by Neltje Blanchan, an early birding book, sold over 250,000 copies. It was illustrated with color photographs of stuffed birds.

The organization and networking of those interested in birds began through organizations like the Audubon Society, which was against the killing of birds, and the American Ornithologists' Union (AOU). The availability of first the bicycle and then the car increased the mobility of birdwatchers and this made new locations accessible. Networks of birdwatchers in the UK began to form in the late 1930s under the British Trust for Ornithology (BTO). The BTO saw the potential to produce scientific results through the networks, unlike the Royal Society for the Protection of Birds (RSPB) which like the Audubon Society originated from the bird protection movement.

Like the AOU in North America, the BOU had a focus mainly on collection-based taxonomy. The BOU changed focus to ecology and behaviour only in the 1940s. The BTO movement towards 'organized birdwatching' was opposed by the RSPB, which claimed that the 'scientification' of the pastime was 'undesirable'. This stand was to change only in 1936 when the RSPB was taken over by Tom Harrisson and others. Harrisson was instrumental in the organization of pioneering surveys of the great crested grebe.

Increased mobility of birdwatchers ensured that books like Where to Watch Birds by John Gooders became best-sellers. By the 1960s air travel became feasible and long-distance holiday destinations opened up. By 1965, Britain's first birding tour company, Ornitholidays had been started by Lawrence Holloway. Travelling far away also led to problems in name usage: British birds such as "wheatear", "heron" and "swallow" needed adjectives to differentiate them in places where there were several related species. The falling cost of air travel made flying to remote birding destinations a possibility for a large number of people towards the 1980s. The need for global guides to birds increased, and one of the biggest resulting projects was the Handbook of the Birds of the World, begun in the 1990s by Josep del Hoyo, Jordi Sargatal, David A. Christie, and ornithologist Andy Elliott.

Initially, birdwatching was largely restricted to developed countries such as the United Kingdom and the United States of America. Since the second half of the 20th century an increasing number of people in developing countries have engaged in this activity, such as in the Degua Tembien district of Ethiopia. Transnational birding has played an important role in this, as birders in developing countries usually take up the pastime under the influence of foreign cultures with a history of birding. A majority of transnational birders are middle-aged, male, affluent, and belong to the Anglophone countries or Scandinavia.

== Economic and environmental impact ==
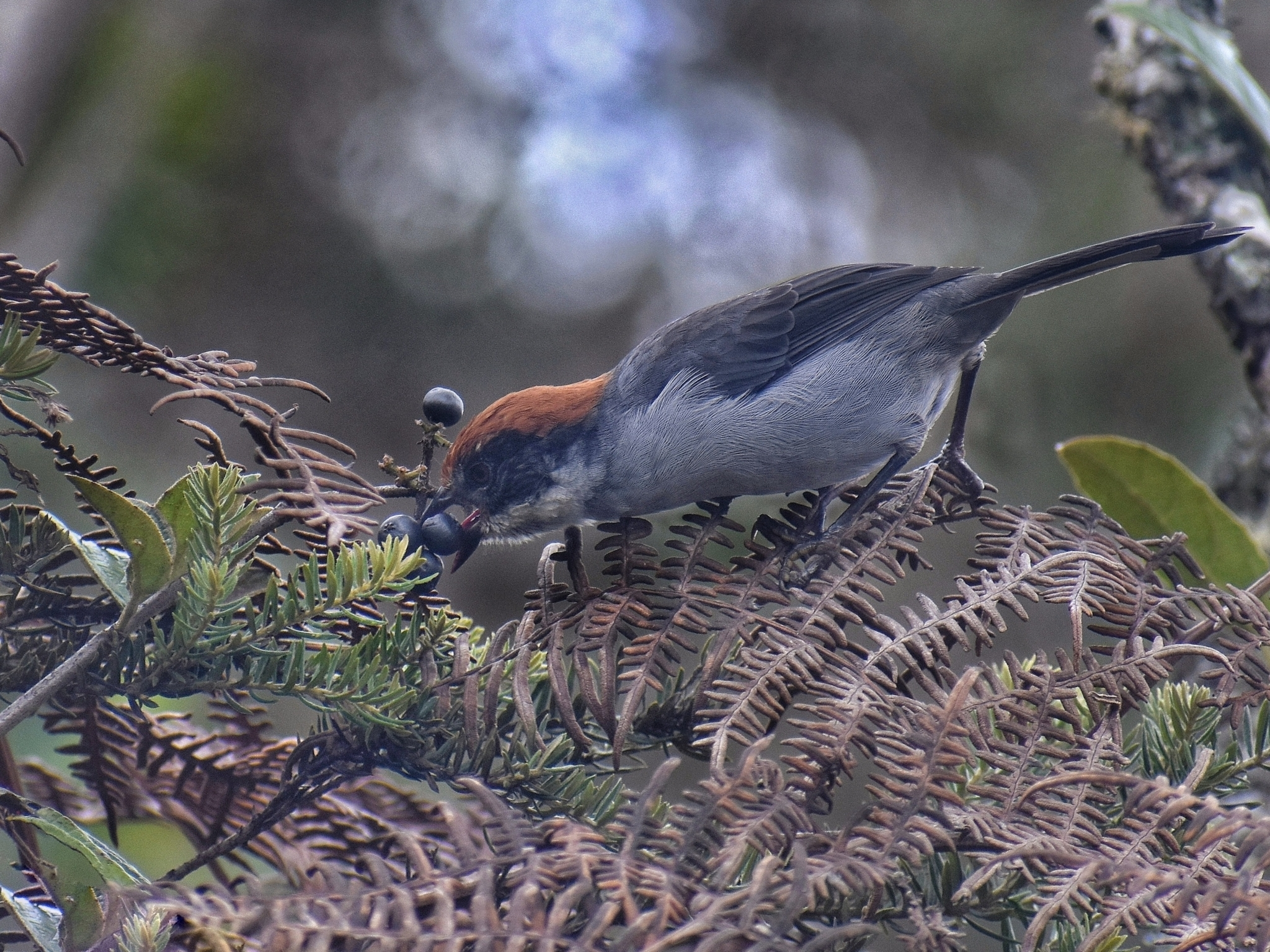
Spotting rare birds, such as the Antioquia brushfinch, is a goal for some birdwatchers.

In the 20th century, most of the birding activity in North America was done on the east coast. The publication of Roger Tory Peterson's field guide in 1934 led to the initial increase in birding. Binoculars, an essential piece of birding equipment, became more easily available after World War II, making the hobby more accessible. The practice of travelling long distances to see rare bird species was aided by the availability of cars and their associated infrastructure. Nevertheless, distance to urban centres may still affect number of birdwatchers participating in observations of rare bird species. About 4% of North Americans were interested in birding in the 1970s, and in the mid-1980s at least 11% were found to watch birds at least 20 days of the year. The number of birders was estimated at 61 million in the late 1980s. The income level of birders has been found to be well above average.

The Sibley Guide to Birds, published in 2000, had sold 500,000 copies by 2002. It was found that the number of birdwatchers rose, but there appeared to be a drop in birdwatching in the backyard.

According to a U.S. Fish and Wildlife Service study, birders contributed $36 billion to the US economy in 2006, and one fifth (20%) of all Americans are identified as birdwatchers. According to the U.S. Fish and Wildlife Service in 2016, over 45 million Americans consider themselves birders.

North American birders were estimated to have spent as much as US$32 billion in 2001. The spending is on the rise around the world. Kuşcenneti National Park (KNP) at Lake Manyas, a Ramsar site in Turkey, was estimated to attract birders who spent as much as US$103,320,074 annually. Guided bird tours have become a major business, with at least 127 companies offering tours worldwide. An average trip to a less-developed country costs $4,000 per person and includes about 12 participants for each of 150 trips a year. It has been suggested that this economic potential needs to be tapped for conservation.

Birdwatching tourism is considered to be one of the fastest-growing nature-based tourism sectors in the world, often involving well-educated or wealthy travelers with specific interests in the places they visit. In addition to this, birdwatching tourism is considered a niche market of nature-based tourism. Birdwatching and other niche tourism markets are good for market diversification and mitigating the impacts of seasonality in a tourism market as well as bringing economic resources to remote communities, thus diversifying their economies and contributing to biodiversity conservation. It is estimated that birdwatching ecotourism contributes $41 billion per year to the U.S. economy. The large funds generated by birdwatching ecotourism have been suggested as a replacement for tax revenue generated by bird hunting which has dropped to its lowest levels in decades.

Birding ecotourism companies are also making contributions to conservation. Birding Ecotours, which runs both international and domestic trips, donates a minimum of 10% of its net profits to bird conservation and communities it operates in. Another tour operator, Hardy Boat, has donated $200,000 to Project Puffin to conserve puffin populations off the Atlantic Coast.

One of the expectations of ecotourism is that the travels of birders to a place will contribute to the improvement of the local economy, ensuring that the environment is valued and protected. Birdwatchers contribute to conservation, helping build and disseminate environmental knowledge by participating in citizen science. However, birding can bring about an increased penetration of ecosystem services that are perceived as birdwatchers' indispensable attributes. By their presence and obstinacy, birdwatchers affect the attractiveness of the breeding migration or roosting sites for birds, flush birds, and otherwise increase the pressure on birds and their habitats (e.g., luring birds out of their hideouts and stressing them by playing their calls or exposing birds and their nests to predators). Furthermore, other impacts include disturbance to birds, the environment, local cultures and the economy. Methods to reduce negative impact and improve the value of conservation are the subject of research.

== Activities ==
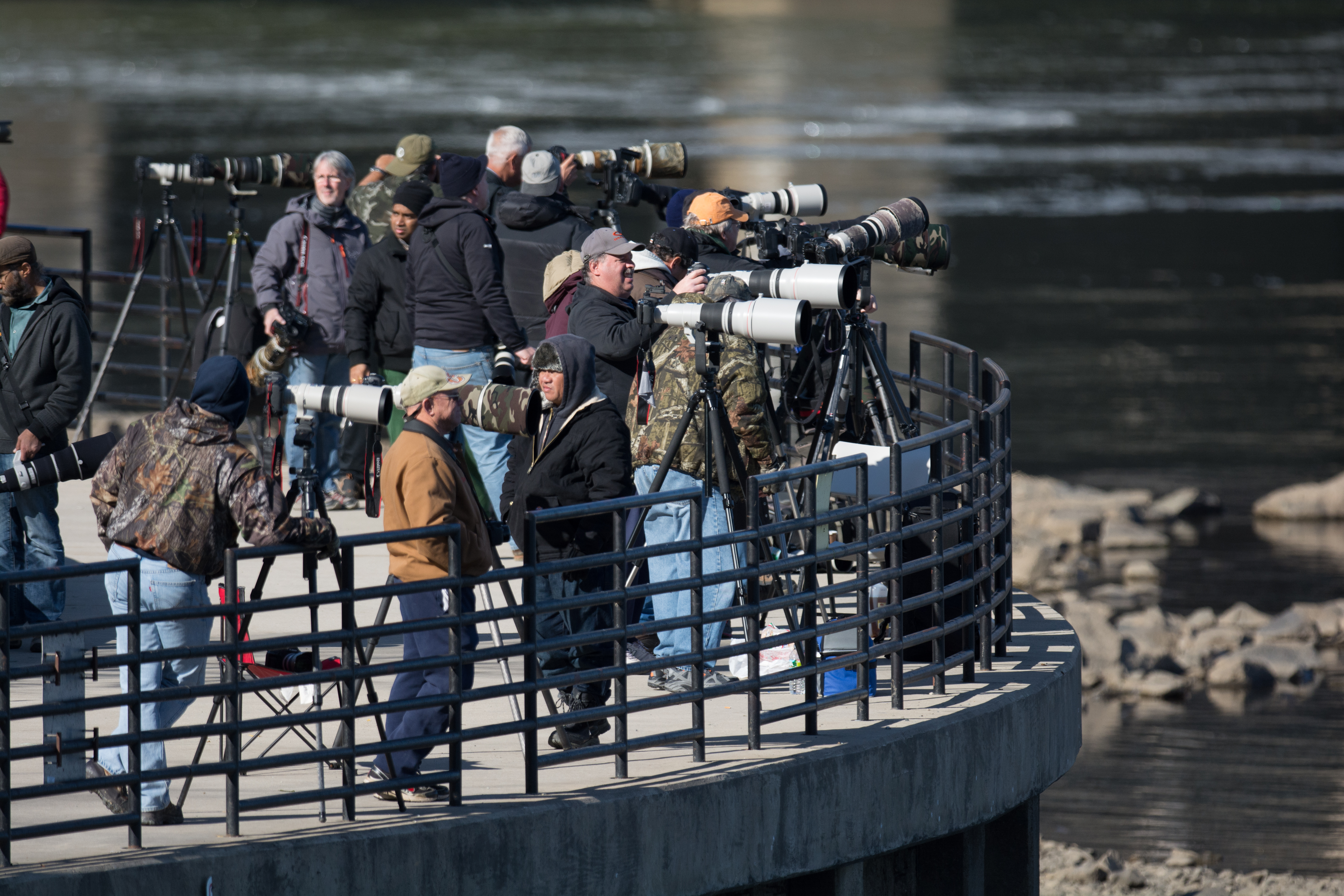
Photographers at Maryland's Conowingo Dam, a popular winter location for seeing bald eagles.

Many birders occupy themselves with observing local species (birding in their "local patch"), but may also make specific trips to observe birds in other locales. The most active times of the year for birding in temperate zones are during the spring or fall migrations when the greatest variety of birds may be seen. On these occasions, large numbers of birds travel north or south to wintering or nesting locations. Early mornings are typically better as the birds are more active and vocal making them easier to spot.

Certain locations such as a local patch of forest, wetland and coast may be favoured according to the location and season. Seawatching, or pelagic birding, is a type of birding where observers based at a coastal watch point, such as a headland, watch birds flying over the sea. This is one form of pelagic birding, though birders also seek pelagic species from seagoing vessels.

The term "owling" is sometimes used to describe a type of birding in which owls are the primary target of observation. Owling differs from conventional birding in that it is usually done at night and more heavily relies on a birder's sense of hearing when searching for owls in their environment.

Weather plays an important role in the occurrence of rare birds. In Britain, suitable wind conditions may lead to drift migration, and an influx of birds from the east. In North America, birds caught in the tail-end of a hurricane may be blown inland.

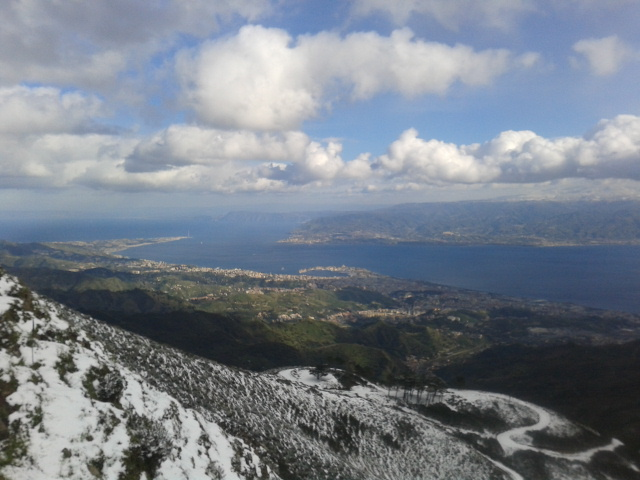
The Strait of Messina, Sicily, a classic migration bottleneck, seen from the Peloritani mountains

=== Monitoring ===
Birders may take part in censuses of bird populations and migratory patterns which are sometimes specific to individual species. These birdwatchers may also count all birds in a given area, as in the Christmas Bird Count, or follow carefully designed study protocols. This kind of citizen science can assist in identifying environmental threats to the well-being of birds or, conversely, in assessing outcomes of environmental management initiatives intended to ensure the survival of at-risk species or to encourage the breeding of species for aesthetic or ecological reasons.

This more scientific side of the hobby is an aspect of ornithology, coordinated in the UK by the British Trust for Ornithology. The Cornell Lab of Ornithology hosts many citizen-science projects to track the number and distribution of bird species across North America. These surveys help scientists note major changes from year to year which may occur as a result of climate change, disease, predation, and other factors.

=== Environmental education ===
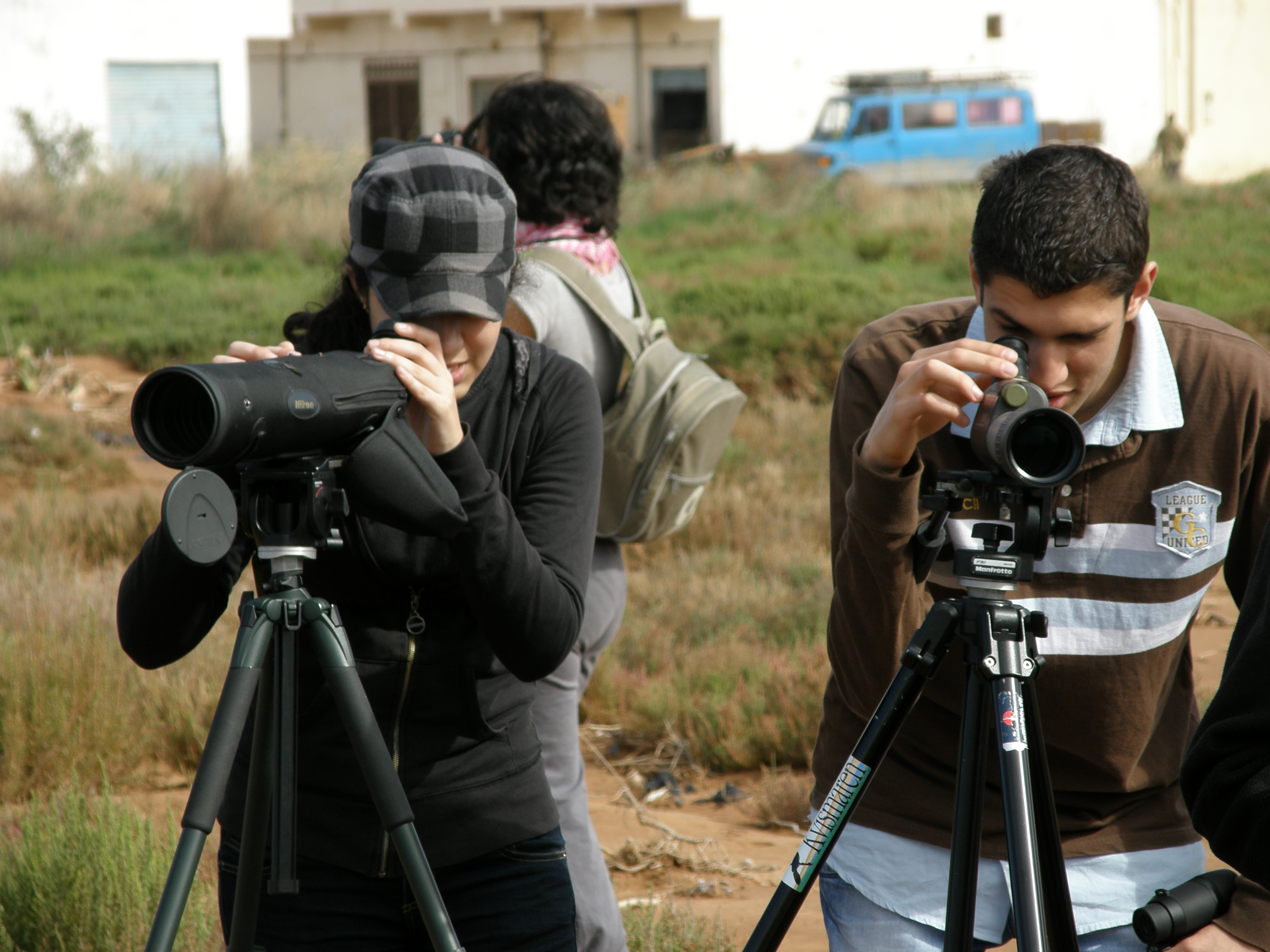
Moroccan students watching birds at Nador's lagoon as a part of environmental education activities organized by the Spanish Ornithological Society

Because of their accessibility and ubiquity, birds are a useful tool for environmental education and awareness of environmental issues. Birdwatching can increase respect for nature and awareness of the fragility of ecosystems.

=== Competition ===
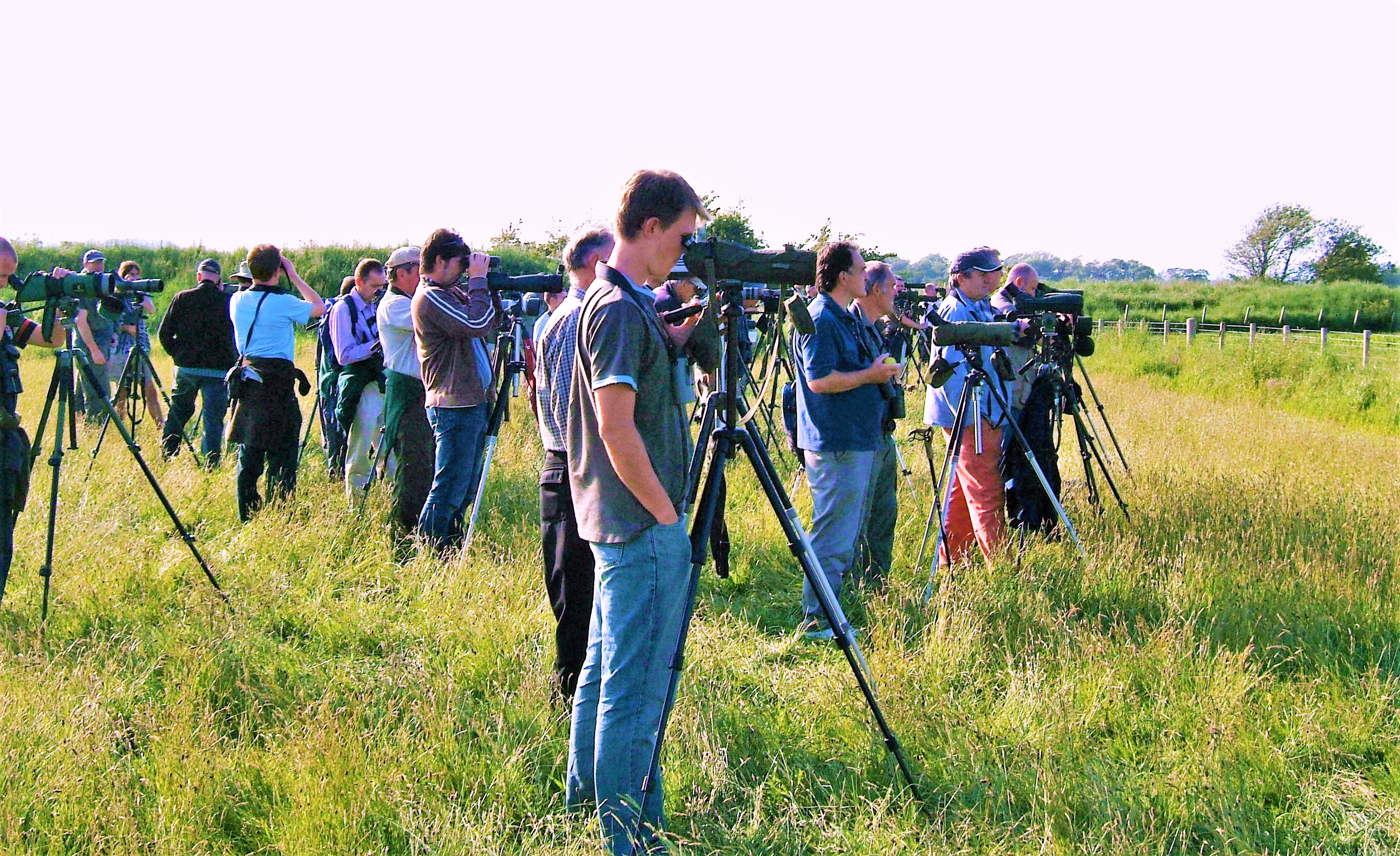
Birdwatchers watching Britain's fifth-ever white-tailed lapwing at Caerlaverock, Scotland, 6 June 2007

Birding as a competitive event is organized in some parts of the world. Such competitions encourage individuals or teams to accumulate large numbers of species within a specified time or area with special rules. Some birdwatchers will also compete by attempting to increase their life list, national list, state list, provincial list, county list, or year list. The American Birding Association was originally started as a club for "listers", but it now serves a much broader audience. Still, the ABA continues to publish an official annual report of North American list standings.

Competitive birdwatching events include:

- Big Day: teams have 24 hours to identify as many species as possible.
- Big Year: like a big day, but contestants are individuals, and need to be prepared to invest a great deal of time and money.
- Big Sit or Big Stay: birdwatchers must see birds from a circle of prescribed diameter (e.g.: 17 feet). Once birds are spotted, birdwatchers can leave the circle to confirm the identity, but new birds seen may not be counted.
- Christmas Bird Count: See as many birds as possible between December 14 and January 5.
- World Series of Birding: An annual birding competition organised by the New Jersey Audubon Society. Teams compete to identify the greatest number of bird species in a 24-hour period.
- Migration Madness: A month-long festival celebrating bird migration. Migration Madness features a Birdathon. The Birdathon is a competition at any time during May 2024. The goal is to spot as many bird species as you can.
- Life List

Many birders keep a list of all the birds they have seen. Some lists are confined to particular geographical regions or time periods.

== Networking and organization ==
Prominent national and continental organizations concerned with birding include the British Trust for Ornithology and Royal Society for the Protection of Birds in the United Kingdom, and the American Birding Association, Birds Canada and the Cornell Lab of Ornithology in North America. Many statewide or local Audubon organizations are also active in the United States, as are many provincial and local organizations in Canada. BirdLife International is an important global alliance of bird conservation organizations. Many countries and smaller regions (states/provinces) have "rarities committees" to check, accept or reject reports of rare birds made by birders.

== Equipment and technology ==
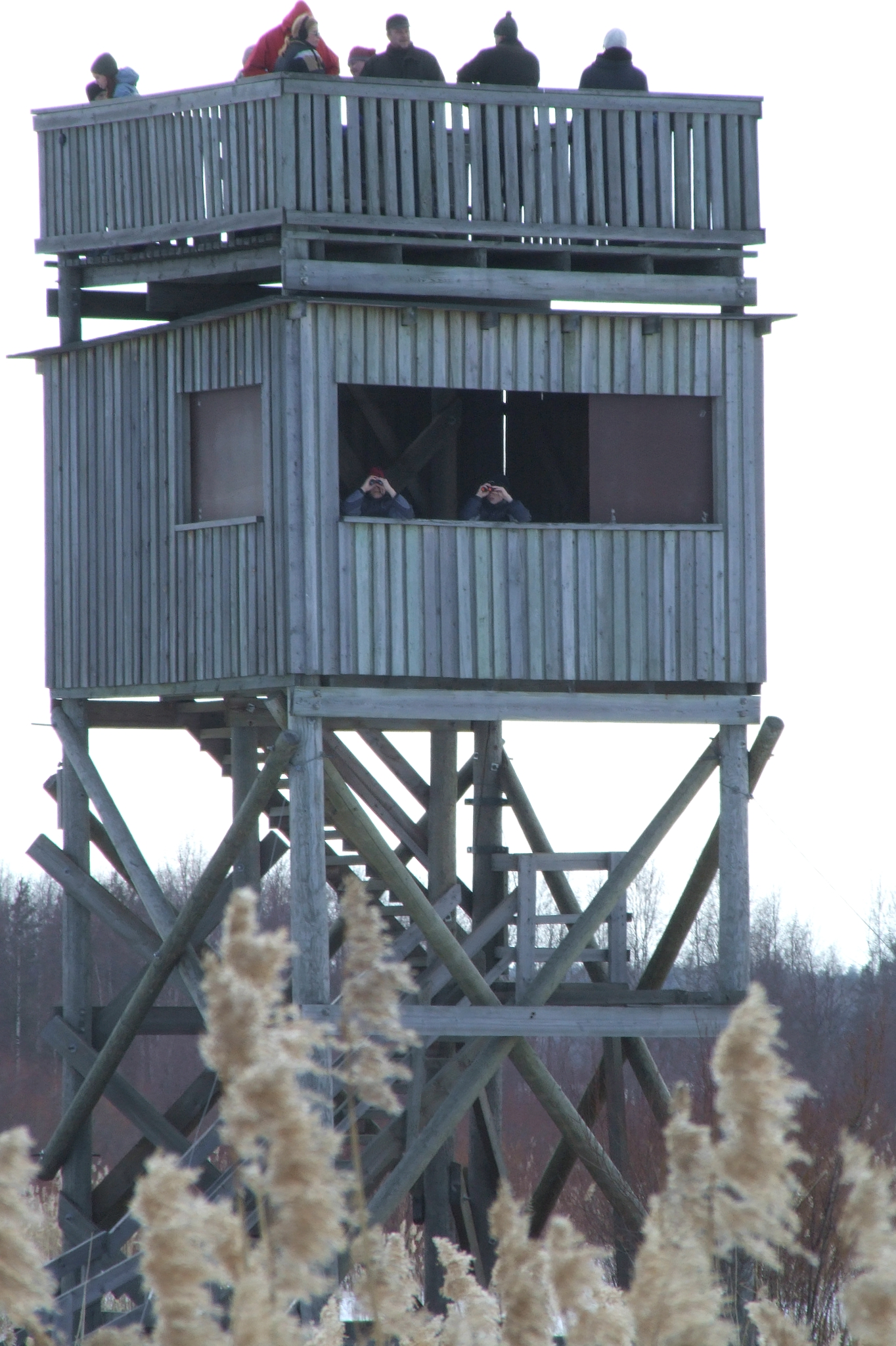
Birders using a tower hide to gain views over foreground vegetation. Bay of Liminka, south of Oulu, Finland

Equipment commonly used for birding includes binoculars, a spotting scope with tripod, a smartphone, a notepad, and one or more field guides. Hides (known as blinds in North America) or observation towers are often used to conceal the observers from birds, and/or to improve viewing conditions. Virtually all optics manufacturers offer specific binoculars for birding, and some have even geared their whole brand to birders.

=== Sound equipment ===
Recognition of bird vocalizations is an important part of a birder's toolkit. Sound information can assist in the locating, watching, identification, and sometimes sexing of birds. Recent developments in audio technology have seen recording and reproduction devices shrink in both size and price, making them accessible to a greater portion of the birding community.

The non-linear nature of digital audio technology has influenced some birdwatchers to choose digital alternatives to tape-based models. The main reasoning for this change is the ease of storing data from cellphones and other mobile devices. The ability to record bird sightings and log them with the assistance of some applications is preferred by some bird watchers over traditional birdwatching tools.

Digital networks have also been used by researchers and birdwatchers to mine sound recordings with the goal of identifing and tracking specific bird calls.

=== Photography ===
Photography has always been a part of birding, but in the past the cost of cameras with super-telephoto lenses made this a minority, often semi-professional, interest. The advent of affordable digital cameras, which can be used in conjunction with a spotting scope or binoculars (using the technique of afocal photography, referred to by the neologism "digiscoping" or sometimes digibinning for binoculars), have made this a much more widespread aspect of the hobby.

=== Videography ===
As with the arrival of affordable digital cameras, the development of more compact and affordable digital video cameras has made them more attractive and accessible to the birding community. Cross-over, non-linear digital models now exist that take high-quality stills at acceptable resolutions, as well as being able to record and play audio and video. The ability to capture and reproduce not only the visual characteristics of a bird, but also its patterns of movement and its sound, has wide applications for birders in the field.

=== Portable media players ===
This class of product includes devices that can play (and in some cases record) a range of digital media, typically video, audio and still image files. Many modern digital cameras, mobile phones, and camcorders can be classified as portable media players. With the ability to store and play large quantities of information, pocket-sized devices allow a full birding multimedia library to be taken into the field and mobile Internet access makes obtaining and transmitting information possible in near real time.

=== Remote birdwatching ===
New technologies are allowing birdwatching activities to take place over the Internet, using robotic camera installations and mobile phones set up in remote wildlife areas. Projects such as CONE allow users to observe and photograph birds over the web; similarly, robotic cameras set up in largely inhospitable areas are being used to attempt the first photographs of the rare ivory-billed woodpecker. These systems represent new technologies in the birdwatcher's toolkit.

=== Communication ===
In the early 1950s, the only way of communicating new bird sightings was through the postal system and it was generally too late for the recipients to act on the information. In 1953 James Ferguson-Lees began broadcasting rare bird news on the radio in Eric Simms' Countryside program but this did not catch on. In the 1960s people began using the telephone and some people became hubs for communication. In the 1970s some cafés, such as that in Cley, Norfolk run by Nancy Gull, became centers for meeting and communication. This was replaced by telephone hotline services such as "Birdline" and "Bird Information Service".

With the advent of the World Wide Web, birders have been using the Internet to convey information; this can be via mailing lists, forums, bulletin-boards, web-based databases and other social media. While most birding lists are geographic in scope, there are special-interest lists that cater to bird-identification, 'twitchers', seabirds and raptor enthusiasts to name but a few. Messages can range from the serious to trivial, notifying others of rarities, questioning the taxonomy or identification of a species, discussing field guides and other resources, asking for advice and guidance, or organizing groups to help save habitats.

Occasional postings are mentioned in academic journals and therefore can be a valuable resource for professional and amateur birders alike. One of the oldest, Birdchat (based in the US), probably has the most subscribers, followed by the English-language fork of Eurobirdnet, Birding-Aus from Australia, SABirdnet from South Africa and Orientalbirding.

=== Mobile applications ===
The increasing availability of mobile devices in the 2010s allowed the smartphone to become a useful tool for birding. Mobile apps can be used as replacements for physical birding field guides, such as the digital version of the Sibley Guide to Birds and the official Audubon Society app. Other apps utilize machine learning to automatically identify birds from photographs and audio recordings, such as the Cornell Lab of Ornithology's Merlin Bird ID application and iNaturalist.

Cornell Lab of Ornithology's eBird database is a popular tool used by birders to document their sightings. In addition to serving as a citizen science project used by ornithologists to document trends in bird populations, it allows birders see recent reports by other birders and search by species and location. Some species, including endangered species and others likely to be disrupted by increased human activity, are designated "sensitive species" by eBird and have locations of sightings hidden from the general public.

=== Code of conduct ===
As the numbers of birdwatchers increases, there is growing concern about the impact of birdwatching on the birds and their habitat. Birdwatching etiquette is evolving in response to this concern. Some examples of birdwatching etiquette include promoting the welfare of birds and their environment, limiting use of photography, pishing and playback devices to mitigate stress caused to birds, maintaining a distance away from nests and nesting colonies, and respecting private property.

The lack of definite evidence, except arguably in the form of photographs, makes birding records difficult to prove but birdwatchers strive to build trust in their identification. One of the few major disputes was the case of the Hastings Rarities.

== Socio-psychology ==
Ethologist Nikolaas Tinbergen considers birdwatching to be an expression of the male hunting instinct, while Simon Baron-Cohen links it with a male tendency for "systemizing". There have been suggestions that identification of birds may be a form of gaining status which has been compared with Kula valuables noted in Papua New Guinean cultures.

A study of the motivations for birdwatching in New York concluded that initial motivations were largely similar in males and females, but males who participate actively in birding are more motivated by "sharing knowledge" with others, and active female birders are more motivated by their "intellectual" interest in studying birds, and by the "challenge" of identifying new and rare birds and improving their skills. Another study suggested that males lean towards competitive birding, while females prefer recreational birdwatching. A study for birdwatchers in Poland found that the proportion of female birdwatchers involved in twitching has grown in recent years and that female birdwatchers were more willing to participate in observations of more common bird rarities than male birdwatchers. While the representation of women has always been low, it has been pointed out that nearly 90% of all birdwatchers in the United States are white, with only a few African Americans. Other minority groups have formed organizations to support fellow birders, such as the Gay Birders Club and Birding For All, formerly the Disabled Birders Association.

The study of birdwatching has been of interest to students of the sociology of science. A 2024 study conducted in Iran examined how personality traits predict birdwatching interest and self-identification as a birdwatcher. The results highlighted that openness to experience, agreeableness, and conscientiousness positively influenced engagement, while neuroticism had a negative effect. People who have nature-based experiences report better well-being and lower psychological distress than those who do not, and birdwatching in particular was found to have higher gains in subjective well-being and more reduction in distress than more generic nature exposure, such as walks, for these reasons, it is also used as a therapy for people with dementia.

== Famous birdwatchers ==
Brazilian president Lula da Silva birdwatching in Antarctica

There are more than 11,000 species of bird and only a small number of people have seen more than 7,000. Many birdwatchers have spent their entire lives trying to see all the bird species of the world. The first person who started this is said to be Stuart Keith.

Birders have been known to go to great lengths and some have lost their lives in the process. Phoebe Snetsinger spent her family inheritance travelling to various parts of the world while suffering from a melanoma, surviving an attack and rape in New Guinea before dying in a road accident in Madagascar. She saw as many as 8,400 species. The birdwatcher David Hunt who was leading a bird tour in Corbett National Park was killed by a tiger in February 1985. In 1971, Ted Parker (who later died in an air crash in Ecuador) travelled around North America and saw 626 species. This record was beaten by Kenn Kaufman in 1973 who travelled 69,000 miles and saw 671 species and spent less than a thousand dollars.

In 2012, Tom Gullick, an Englishman who lived in Spain, became the first birdwatcher to log over 9,000 species. In 2008, two British birders, Alan Davies and Ruth Miller, gave up their jobs, sold their home and put everything they owned into a year-long global birdwatching adventure about which they a wrote a book called The Biggest Twitch. They logged their 4,341st species on 31 December 2008, in Ecuador. Noah Strycker recorded 6,042 species during 2015, overtaking Davies and Miller. In 2016, Arjan Dwarshuis became the world-record holder for most species seen during the span of one year, logging 6,852 bird species in 40 countries.

In early February 2024, Peter Kaestner became the first birder to log over 10,000 species, a record surrounded by much controversy as he was initially claimed to be beaten by Jason Mann who later conceded defeat.

Birdwatching literature, field guides, and television programs have been popularized by birders such as Pete Dunne and Bill Oddie.

== In media ==
The 2011 film The Big Year depicted three birders competing in an American Birding Association Area big year, and the 2019 film Birders is a short documentary.

A 2026 video game, Flock Around, simulates birdwatching by having players photograph birds in a nature reserve and record them in a guidebook; the species are based on birds from the Pacific Northwest.

== See also ==
- Bird feeding
- Bird hide
- Bird migration
- Black Birders Week
- Important Bird Area
- List of birding books
- List of individual birds
- List of ornithology journals

Similar activities

- Butterfly watching
- Mothing
- Planespotting

Institutions:

- American Birding Association
- Cornell Lab of Ornithology
- National Audubon Society
- Royal Society for the Protection of Birds
- World Series of Birding
- BirdLife Australia

== Bibliography ==
- Cocker, Mark (2002). Birders: Tales of a Tribe. Grove Press. ISBN 0-871-13844-1.
- Lewis, Daniel (2012). The Feathery Tribe: Robert Ridgway and the Modern Study of Birds. Yale University Press. ISBN 978-0-300-17552-3.
- Moss, Stephen (2004). A Bird in the Bush: A Social History of Birdwatching. Aurum Press. ISBN 1-85410-993-6.
- Weidensaul, Scott (2007). Of a Feather: A Brief History of Birding. Orlando: Harcourt. ISBN 978-0-151-01247-3.
