= EBird =

Online database of bird observations

eBird
- Logo used since 2024
- Website type: Wildlife database
- Available in: 14 languages (but see Features, below)
- Creator: Cornell Lab of Ornithology
- Website: ebird.org
- Launched: 2002 (24 years ago)
- Current status: Active

eBird is an online database of bird observations providing scientists, researchers and amateur naturalists with real-time data about bird distribution and abundance. Originally restricted to sightings from the Western Hemisphere, the project expanded to include New Zealand in 2008, and to cover the whole world in June 2010. eBird has been described as an ambitious example of enlisting amateurs to gather data on biodiversity for use in science.

eBird is an example of crowdsourcing, and has been hailed as an example of democratizing science, treating citizens as scientists, allowing the public to access and use their own data and the collective data generated by others.

== History and purpose ==
Launched in 2002 by the Cornell Lab of Ornithology at Cornell University and the National Audubon Society, eBird gathers basic data on bird abundance and distribution at a variety of spatial and temporal scales. It was mainly inspired by the ÉPOQ database, created by Jacques Larivée in 1975. As of May 12, 2021, there were over one billion bird observations recorded through this global database. In recent years, there have been over 100 million bird observations recorded each year.

eBird's goal is to maximize the utility and accessibility of the vast numbers of bird observations made each year by recreational and professional birders. The observations of each participant join those of others in an international network. Due to the variability in the observations the volunteers make, AI filters observations through collected historical data to improve accuracy. The data are then available via internet queries in a variety of formats.

=== Use of database information ===
The eBird Database has been used by scientists to determine the connection between bird migrations and monsoon rains in India validating traditional knowledge. It has also been used to notice bird distribution changes due to climate change and help to define migration routes. A study conducted found that eBird lists were accurate at determining population trends and distribution if there were 10,000 checklists for a given area.

== Criticism of data ==
eBird participation in urban areas remains spatially biased with information from higher-income neighborhoods being represented much more. This suggests that eBird data should not be considered reliable for planning purposes, or to understand urban ecology of birds. Such biases can be exacerbated due to events such as the COVID-19 pandemic when governmental policy restricted people's movements in many countries, which led to the data becoming greatly biased to urban locations relative to other habitats.

In another study, eBird data provided a different estimate of suitable habitat for the Nilgiri pipit relative to data collected by scientists (combining field observations and literature review). Authors therefore suggest that spatial distribution models based solely on eBird data should be regarded with caution.

eBird data sets have been shown to be biased not only spatially but temporally. While better roads and areas with denser human populations provided most of the data, eBird records also varied temporally with monthly fluctuations of uploads being very wide, and most of the data being provided on weekends. Inferences based on analyses where eBird data is not corrected to account for such large-scale and long-term biases will yield a biased understanding that indicate eBirder behaviors more than bird behaviors.

A study pointing out that citizen-scientists possess different levels of skill and suggesting that analyses should incorporate corrections for observer bias used eBird as an example.

== Features ==
eBird documents the presence or absence of species, as well as bird abundance through checklist data. A web interface allows participants to submit their observations or view results via interactive queries of the database. Internet tools maintain personal bird records and enable users to visualize data with interactive maps, graphs, and bar charts. As of 2022, the eBird website is fully available in 14 languages (with different dialect options for three of them) and eBird supports common names for birds in 55 languages with 39 regional versions, for a total of 95 regional sets of common names.

Users can manage their life lists digitally using eBird. Though eBird will update users' life lists automatically as new checklists are submitted, observations that are made prior to joining eBird can also be submitted. Observations that are submitted by a user in order to update their life list are not added to the public eBird database.

eBird is a free service. Data are stored in a secure facility and archived daily, and are accessible to anyone via the eBird web site and other applications developed by the global biodiversity information community. For example, eBird data are part of the Avian Knowledge Network (AKN), which integrates observational data on bird populations across the western hemisphere and is a data source for the digital ornithological reference Birds of North America. In turn, the AKN feeds eBird data to international biodiversity data systems, such as the Global Biodiversity Information Facility.

=== Electronic kiosks ===
In addition to accepting records submitted from users' personal computers and mobile devices, eBird has placed electronic kiosks in prime birding locations, including one in the education center at the J. N. "Ding" Darling National Wildlife Refuge on Sanibel Island in Florida.

=== Integration in cars ===
eBird is a part of Starlink on the 2019 Subaru Ascent. It allows eBird to be integrated into the touch screen of the car.

== Extent of information ==
=== Bird checklists ===
eBird collects information worldwide, but the vast majority of checklists are submitted from North America. The numbers of checklists listed in the table below include only complete checklists, where observers report all of the species that they can identify throughout the duration of the checklist.

Location	Number of bird checklists	Percentage of total
World	103,758,820	100%
Western Hemisphere
Western Hemisphere	74,953,085	72.24%
Central America	1,938,420	1.87%
North America	70,966,901	68.4%
South America	3,598,687	3.47%
West Indies	527,019	0.51%
Eastern Hemisphere
Eastern Hemisphere	15,429,988	14.87%
Africa	771,914	0.74%
Asia	5,587,385	5.38%
Australia and territories	2,894,583	2.79%
Europe	5,864,280	5.65%
South Polar
South Polar	38,360	0.04%
As of 29 February 2024

=== Regional portals ===
eBird involves a number of regional portals for different parts of the world, managed by local partners. These portals include the following, separated by region.

==== United States ====
- Alaska eBird
- Arkansas eBird
- eBird Northwest
- Maine eBird
- New Hampshire eBird
- Minnesota eBird
- Montana eBird
- Vermont eBird
- Wisconsin eBird

==== Canada ====
- eBird Atlantic Canada
- eBird Canada
- eBird Québec

==== Caribbean ====
- eBird Caribbean
- eBird Puerto Rico

==== Mexico ====
- eBird Mexico (aVerAves)

==== Central America ====
- eBird Central America
- eBird Costa Rica
- eBird Guatemala
- eBird Honduras

==== South America ====
- eBird Argentina
- eBird Bolivia
- eBird Brasil
- eBird Chile
- eBird Colombia
- eBird Ecuador
- eBird Paraguay
- eBird Peru
- eBird Venezuela

==== Europe ====
- eBird España
- eBird Greece
- eBird Italia
- PortugalAves
- eKuşbank (eBird Turkey)

==== Africa ====
- eBird Rwanda
- eBird Zambia
- eBird Zimbabwe

==== Asia ====
- eBird Hong Kong
- eBird India
- eBird Israel
- eBird Japan
- eBird Malaysia
- eBird Mongolia
- eBird ROK
- eBird Singapore
- eBird Taiwan

==== Australia and New Zealand ====
- eBird Australia
- New Zealand eBird

== Citations ==
- Chris Wood; Brian Sullivan; Marshall Iliff; Daniel Fink; Steve Kelling (2011), "eBird: Engaging Birders in Science and Conservation", PLOS Biology, 9 (12) e1001220, doi:10.1371/journal.pbio.1001220, PMC 3243722, PMID 22205876
- Dickinson, Janis L.; Zuckerberg, Benjamin; Bonter, David N. (2010), "Citizen Science as an Ecological Research Tool: Challenges and Benefits", Annual Review of Ecology, Evolution, and Systematics, 41: 149–172, doi:10.1146/annurev-ecolsys-102209-144636, S2CID 59402300
- Horns, Joshua J.; Adler, Frederick R.; Şekercioğlu, Çağan H. (2018), "Using opportunistic citizen science data to estimate avian population trends.", Biological Conservation, 221: 151–159, Bibcode:2018BCons.221..151H, doi:10.1016/j.biocon.2018.02.027
- Wiggins, Andrea (2011), "EBirding: Technology adoption and the transformation of leisure into science", Proceedings of the 2011 iConference, pp. 798–799, doi:10.1145/1940761.1940910, ISBN 978-1-4503-0121-3, S2CID 19598222
- Yudhijit Bhattacharjee (June 3, 2005), "Citizen Scientists Supplement Work of Cornell Researchers", Science, 308 (5727): 1402–1403, doi:10.1126/science.308.5727.1402, PMID 15933178, S2CID 153447103
