= Marc Parnell =

American ornithologist and writer

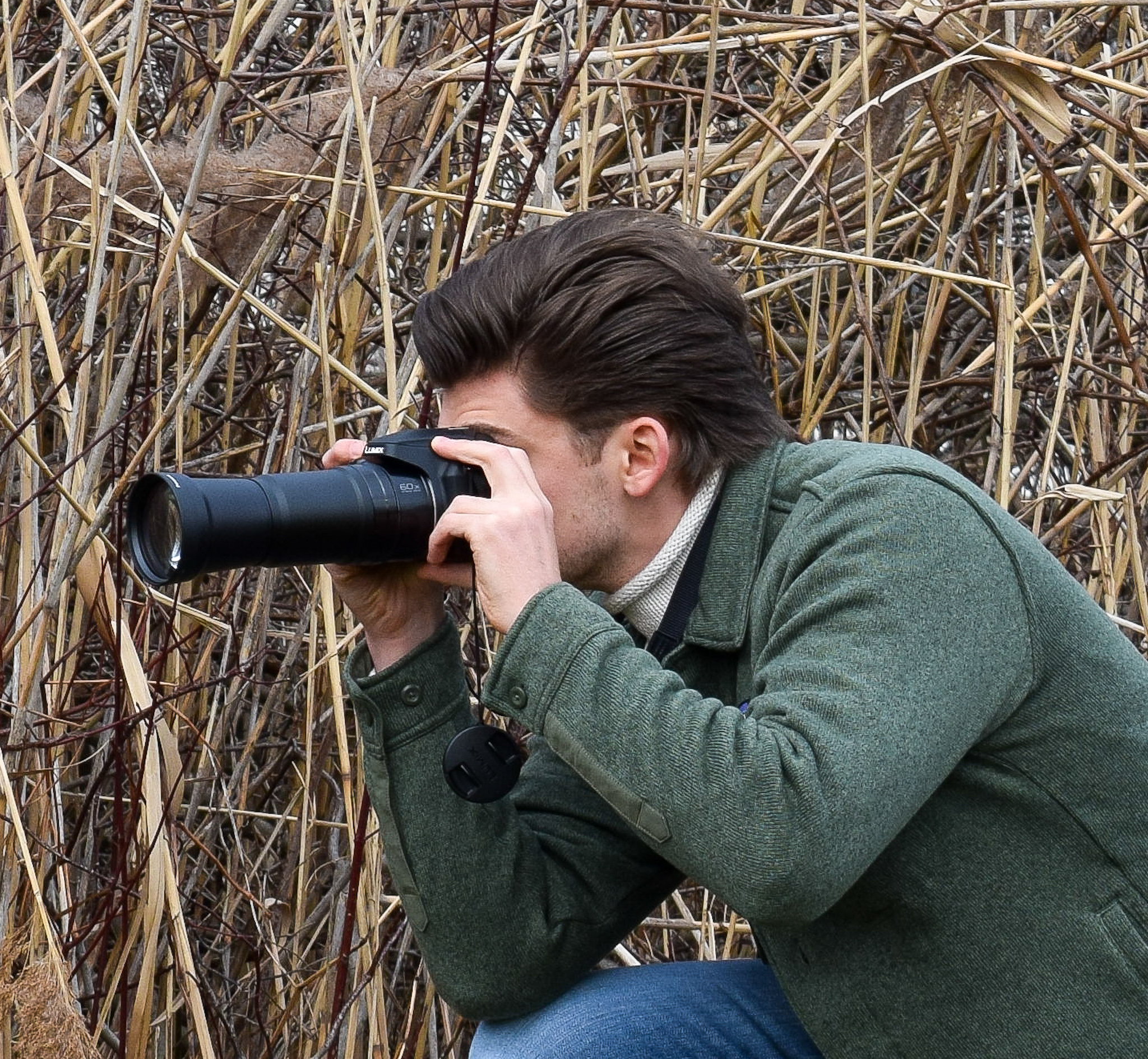
- Born: Greenville, North Carolina
- Occupations: Author, ornithologist, photographer
- Writing career
- Subject: Birds
- Notable work: The Birding Pro's Field Guides
- Website: www.thebirdingpro.com

Marc Parnell is an ornithologist, author, and wildlife photographer. He is best known for The Birding Pro's Field Guides, a series of photographic identification guides to the birds of North America, and is the second-most published ornithologist in the world, based on books in active print.

== Background ==
Parnell was born in Greenville, North Carolina, where the immediate proximity of his childhood home to the banks of the Tar River fostered an early love of nature. These seeds of childhood curiosity began to take greater root after a move to the city of Jamestown, New York, the birthplace of American naturalist Roger Tory Peterson. Parnell cites Peterson among his early influences, having received a green, fabric-bound Peterson Field Guide to Reptiles and Amphibians on the occasion of his fourth birthday. After several additional moves, Parnell spent his teenage years in small-town Pennsylvania before attending Case Western Reserve University in Cleveland, Ohio, where he would eventually reside.

During his time away from home, Parnell had arranged a set of bird feeders in his mother's backyard to serve as a regular topic of conversation, and eventually composed a short, 20-page guide to the local birds that she would be most likely to observe. After having failed to identify a suitable, comprehensive replacement for his mother's booklet, he began to compose the framework of what would eventually become his collected series of field guides.

== Career ==
In early 2021 and 2022, Parnell released a series of 41 photographic bird-identification guides, The Birding Pro's Field Guides, several of which reached bestseller status in multiple countries. These field guides, which each focus on an individual state, city, or province, provide information specific to the local area; for instance, his first-of-their-kind monthly birding forecasts for each species give month-by-month values for local frequency and ease-of-finding. Parnell is known for also having pioneered the birding-by-comparison approach, which allows birders to identify new birds by comparing them to those which they already know, primarily by using size-based and behavioral categorizations.

Parnell follows a multi-step approach to the writing process. Firstly, he locates and observes birds all throughout the calendar year, in a variety of different habitats and geographic locations, so as to best understand each species' evolving behaviors through the passing months. Secondly, he reflects and logs entries in a personal diary, placing emphasis on a contextualized "day-in-the-life" approach to each species. Finally, he uses data analysis to make wider conclusions and to inform the data presented in his final drafts. In addition to the naturalist-specific works of Roger Tory Peterson, Parnell cites Herman Melville, Jack London, and Jorge Luis Borges as literary influences.

Alongside his writing pursuits, Parnell is an educator and advocate for safe birding practices and the mitigation of bird-window collisions. His favorite North American bird is the Rose-breasted Grosbeak. Parnell currently lives in Cleveland, Ohio.

== Publications ==
- The Birding Pro's Field Guides: City Series
- The Birding Pro's Field Guides: State Series
- The Birding Pro's Field Guides: Province Series
