= Chester Reed =

Chester Reed may refer to:

- Chester I. Reed, American attorney, judge and politician
- Chester Albert Reed, American ornithologist
- Chester Read, Australian rules footballer
