= Peterson Field Guides =

American reference works

The Peterson Field Guides (PFG) are a popular and influential series of American field guides intended to assist the layman in identification of birds, plants, insects and other natural phenomena. The series was created and edited by renowned ornithologist Roger Tory Peterson (1908–1996). His inaugural volume was the classic 1934 book A Field Guide to the Birds, published (as were all subsequent volumes) by the Houghton Mifflin Company.

The PFG series used what became known as the Peterson Identification System, a practical method for field identification which highlights readily noticed visual features rather than focusing on the technical features of interest to scientists. The series both reflected and contributed to awareness of the emerging environmental movement.

Most books in this series use a section of plates of drawings (usually reduced from commissioned paintings) rather than photographs of the subject species, grouped at the center of the book. This allows for idealized portraits that highlight the identifying "field marks" of each species; such field marks are often indicated by arrows or straight lines in the plate illustrations. However, in several books in this series, the plates consist of photographs (usually without such arrows or indicators), such as in the guides for the atmosphere, coral reefs, rocks and minerals, and the (old Charles Covell 1984 guide to) Eastern moths. In many books in this series (especially older editions), a number of the plates are in black and white. For examples, older editions of the Eastern reptiles/amphibians book had many black and white plates which were colorized for the current edition, and the original 1934 Eastern bird book had only 4 color plates. At least one book (insects) was entirely in black and white. However, most newer editions are often full-color (or almost full-color) and tend to be larger. One source claims that the increased size of one of the new editions (Eastern reptiles/amphibians) was considered detrimental to its use as a field guide by its own author and was a publisher decision.

In some cases, new "editions" in this series are entirely new books with completely new texts and illustrations. For example, the fourth edition of the mammals guide has an entirely new text and illustrations by new author Fiona Reid, because the author (William Burt) and illustrator (Richard Grossenheider) of previous editions are both deceased. In fact, Grossenheider died prior to the publication of the previous third edition of 1976. Also, the current Northeastern moths guide by David Beadle and Seabrooke Leckie is an entirely new book than the out-of-print 1984 Eastern moths guide by Charles Covell. The Beadle/Leckie book covers a smaller geographical area and (one author claims) covers moths in greater detail. The old Covell book has been out-of-print for many years, but is currently available through the Virginia Museum of Natural History (which purchased the rights to that book).

The above situation of an old "edition" persisting alongside its intended replacement edition is not unique to the Eastern moths guide. George Petrides' 1988 Eastern trees book (PFG11B) was originally intended to replace Petrides' own 1958 Eastern tree and shrubs (PFG11A) book. However, both books remain popular and the original publisher still offers both books for sale (unlike the case of the old Eastern moths book).

Differences between editions can serve to indicate changes in scientific perspective as well as changes species distribution. For example, the second edition of the freshwater fishes guide by Page and Burr (2011), published 20 years after the first edition, increased the number of species included from 768 to 909, largely due to the addition of previously unrecognized species (114), as well as increased numbers of newly established exotic species (16). It also expanded coverage of marine fish commonly found in freshwater (19).

== The Peterson Field Guides ==
- PFG 1: A Field Guide to the Birds (1934), by Roger Tory Peterson
  - Second edition (1939): A Field Guide to the Birds
  - Third edition (1947): A Field Guide to the Birds
  - Fourth edition (1980): A Field Guide to the Birds: A Completely New Guide to All the Birds of Eastern and Central North America
  - Fifth edition (2002): A Field Guide to the Birds of Eastern and Central North America
  - Sixth edition (2010): Field Guide to Birds of Eastern and Central North America, ISBN 9780547152462
  - Seventh edition (2020): Field Guide to Birds of Eastern & Central North America, ISBN 9781328771438
- PFG ??: Field Guide to Birds of North America (2008), ISBN 9780618966141
  - Second edition (2020): Field Guide to Birds of North America, ISBN 9781328771445
- PFG 1A: Bird Songs (Eastern) (1990)[CD] by the Cornell Laboratory of Ornithology
- PFG 2: A Field Guide to Western Birds: Field Marks of All Species Found in North America West of the 100th Meridian, with a Section on the Birds of the Hawaiian Islands (1941), by Roger Tory Peterson and Virginia Marie Peterson
  - Second edition (1961): A Field Guide to Western Birds: Field Marks of All Species Found in North America West of the 100th Meridian, with a Section on the Birds of the Hawaiian Islands
  - Third edition (1990): A Field Guide to Western Birds: A Completely New Guide to Field Marks of All Species Found in North America West of the 100th Meridian and North of Mexico
- PFG 2A: Western Bird Songs (1962) by the Cornell Laboratory of Ornithology
  - Second edition (1992)
- PFG 3: A Field Guide to Shells of the Atlantic and Gulf Coasts and the West Indies (1947), by Percy A. Morris
  - Second edition (1951)
  - Third edition (1973)
  - Fourth edition (1995), by R. Tucker Abbott and Percy A. Morris; Photos by R. Tucker Abbott
- PFG 4A: Field Guide to the Butterflies of North America, East of the Great Plains (1951), by Alexander B. Klots
- PFG 4B: PFG 4A replaced by A Field Guide to Eastern Butterflies (1992), by Paul A. Opler; Illustrated by Vichai Malikul
  - Second edition (1998)
- PFG 5: A Field Guide to the Mammals: Field Marks of All North American Species Found North of Mexico (1952), by William Henry Burt; Illustrated by Richard Philip Grossenheider
  - Second edition (1964)
  - Third edition (1976)
  - Fourth edition (2006): A Field Guide to Mammals of North America, by Fiona Reid
- PFG 6: A Field Guide to Pacific Coast Shells, Including Shells of Hawaii and the Gulf of California (1952), by Percy A. Morris
  - Second edition (1966)
- PFG 7: A Field Guide to the Rocks and Minerals of North America (1953), by Frederick H. Pough and Jeffrey Scovil
  - Second edition (1955)
  - Third edition (1960)
  - Fourth edition (1976)
- PFG 8: A Field Guide to the Birds of Britain and Europe (1954), by Roger Tory Peterson, Guy Mountfort, and P.A.D. Hollom
  - Second edition (1965), additional authors: I.J. Ferguson-Lees and D.I.M. Wallace
  - Third edition (1974), ISBN 9780002191777
  - Fourth edition (1983), ISBN 9780002190732
    - Fourth edition, revised and enlarged (1983)
  - Fifth edition (1993), ISBN 9780002199001
    - Fifth edition, revised and enlarged (2004), ISBN 9780007192342 (this was a 50th Anniversary edition, which is sometimes mistakenly referred to as the sixth edition)
- PFG 9: Animal Tracks (1954), by Olaus J. Murie
  - Second edition (1974)
  - Third edition (2005), by Olaus J. Murie and Mark Elbroch
- PFG 10: A Field Guide to Ferns and Their Related Families: Northeastern and Central North America with a Section on Species Also Found in the British Isles and Western Europe (1956), by Boughton Cobb and Laura Louise Foster
  - Second edition (1963): A Field Guide to Ferns, Second Edition: Northeastern and Central North America by Boughton Cobb, Cheryl Lowe, and Elizabeth Farnsworth
- PFG 11A: A Field Guide to Trees and Shrubs: Northeastern and North-Central United States and Southeastern and South-Central Canada (1958), by George A. Petrides
  - Second edition (1972): A Field Guide to Trees and Shrubs: Field Marks of All Trees, Shrubs, and Woody Vines That Grow Wild in the Northeastern and North-Central United States
- PFG 11B: PFG 11A revised as A Field Guide to Eastern Trees: Eastern United States and Canada (1988), by George A. Petrides; Illustrated by Janet Wehr
  - First edition, expanded [sic]: A Field Guide to Eastern Trees: Eastern United States and Canada, Including the Midwest (1998)
- PFG 12: A Field Guide to Reptiles and Amphibians of the United States and Canada East of the 100th Meridian (1958) by Roger Conant; Illustrated by Isabelle Hunt Conant
  - Second edition (1975): A Field Guide to Reptiles and Amphibians of Eastern and Central North America
  - Third edition (1991), additional author: Joseph T. Collins, and illustrator: Tom R. Johnson
    - Third edition, expanded (1998)
  - Fourth edition, (2016), additional author: Robert Powell
- PFG 13: A Field Guide to Birds of Texas and Adjacent States (1960), by Roger Tory Peterson; Illustrations by Roger Tory Peterson
- PFG 14: A Field Guide to Rocky Mountain Wildflowers from Northern Arizona and New Mexico to British Columbia (1968), by John Craighead, Ray J. Davis, Frank C. Craighead, and Eduardo Salgado
  - Second edition (1996)
- PFG 15: A Field Guide to the Stars and Planets (1964), by Donald Howard Menzel; Illustrations by Ching Sung Yu
  - Second edition (19??): by Jay M. Pasachoff, Wil Tirion and Donald Howard Menzel; Additional author: Ching Sung Yu
  - Third edition (1992)
  - Fourth edition (2000)
- PFG 16: A Field Guide to Western Reptiles and Amphibians: Field Marks of All Species in Western North America (1966), by Robert C. Stebbins
  - Second edition (1985): A Field Guide to Western Reptiles and Amphibians: Field Marks of All Species in Western North America, Including Baja California
  - Third edition (2003): A Field Guide to Western Reptiles and Amphibians
- PFG 17: A Field Guide to Wildflowers of Northeastern and North Central North America (1968), by Roger Tory Peterson and Margaret McKenny
- PFG 18:This PFG number was used for two field guides.

In 1968 this number was Mammals of Britain and Europe by Van Den Brink. This title was dropped from the series in 1985.
In 1986 This number became Birds of the West Indies by James Bond.

Both of these guides appeared in the Easton Press leather bound copies of the series. For that series the title of the Bond book was changed to "Birds of the Caribbean". Birds of the West Indies (1999), by James Bond

- PFG 19: A Field Guide to the Insects of America North of Mexico (1970), by Donald J. Borror and Richard E. White
- PFG 20: Mexican Birds: Mexico, Guatemala, Belize, and El Salvador (1973), by Roger Tory Peterson and Edward L. Chalif
- PFG 21: Eastern Birds' Nests: The United States East of the Mississippi River (1975), by Hal H. Harrison, Mada Harrison and Ned Smith
- PFG 22: A Field Guide to Wildflowers of the Pacific States (1976), by Niehaus and Ripper
- PFG 23: A Field Guide to Edible Wild Plants of Eastern and Central North America (1977), by Lee Allen Peterson; Illustrated by Lee Allen Peterson and Roger Tory Peterson; Photos by Lee Allen Peterson
- PFG 24: A Field Guide to the Atlantic Seashore: Invertebrates and Seaweeds of the Atlantic Coast from the Bay of Fundy to Cape Hatteras (1978), by Kenneth L. Gosner; Illustrations by Kenneth L. Gosner
- PFG 25: Western Birds' Nests: The United States West of the Mississippi River (1979), by Harrison
- PFG 26: A Field Guide to the Atmosphere (1981), by Vincent J. Schaefer and John A. Day; Illustrated by Christy E. Day
- PFG 27: A Field Guide to Coral Reefs of the Caribbean and Florida: A Guide to the Common Invertebrates and Fishes of Bermuda, the Bahamas, Southern Florida, the ... (1982), by Eugene H. Kaplan; Illustrations by Susan L. Kaplan
- PFG 28: A Field Guide to Pacific Coast Fishes: The Gulf of Alaska to Baja California (1983), by William N. Eschmeyer, Earl S. Herald, Howard E. Hammann and Katherine P. Smith
- PFG 29: A Field Guide to Beetles of North America (1963), by Richard E. White
- PFG 30: A Field Guide to Moths of Eastern North America (1984), by Charles V. Covell
  - Second edition (2012)
- PFG 31: A Field Guide to Southwestern and Texas Wildflowers (1984), by Theodore F. Niehaus, Charles L. Ripper and Virginia Savage
- PFG 32: A Field Guide to Atlantic Coast Fishes of North America (1986), by C. Richard Robins and G. Carleton Ray; Illustrations by John Douglass and Rudolf Freund
- PFG 33: A Field Guide to Butterflies of Western North America (1986), by Tilden and Smith
  - Second edition (1999): A Field Guide to Western Butterflies by Paul A. Opler and Amy Bartlett Wright
- PFG 34: A Field Guide to Mushrooms of North America (1987), by Kent H. McKnight and Vera B. McKnight; Illustrations by Vera B. McKnight
- PFG 35: A Field Guide to the Hawks of North America (1987), by William S. Clark and Brian K. Wheeler
- PFG 36: A Field Guide to Southeastern and Caribbean Seashores (1988), by Kaplan
- PFG 37: A Field Guide to the Ecology of Eastern Forests: North America (1988), by John C. Kricher; Illustrated by Gordon Morrison
- PFG 38: Birding by Ear: Eastern and Central North America (1989)[cassettes], by Richard K. Walton and Robert W. Lawson
  - Birding by Ear: Eastern and Central North America (2002) (Audiocassette)
  - More Birding by Ear: Eastern and Central North America: A Guide to Bird-Song Identification (2002) by Richard K. Walton and Robert W. Lawson (Audiocassette)
- PFG 39: Advanced Birding (1990), by Kenn Kaufman
- PFG 40: A Field Guide to Medicinal Plants: Eastern and Central North America (1990), by Steven Foster and James A. Duke; Illustrated by Lee Allen Peterson, Jim Bleakfeather Rose and Roger Tory Peterson; Photos by James A. Duke
  - Second Edition (1999)
  - Third Edition (2014)
- PFG 41: Birding by Ear: Western (1990)[CD], by Walton and Lawson
- PFG 42: A Field Guide to Freshwater Fishes of North America North of Mexico (1991), by Lawrence Page and Brooks Burr; Illustrations by Eugene C. Beckham, III, John Parker Sherrod and Craig W. Ronto
  - Second edition (2011): Illustrations by Eugene C. Beckham, III, John Parker Sherrod, Justin T. Sipiorski and Joseph R. Tomelleri; Maps by Griffin E. Sheehy
- PFG 43: Backyard Bird Song (1991)[CD], by Richard K. Walton, Robert W. Lawson and Roger Tory Peterson
- PFG 44: A Field Guide to Western Trees: Western United States and Canada (1992), by George A. Petrides; Illustrated by Olivia Petrides
- PFG 45: A Field Guide to the Ecology of Western Forests (1993), by John C. Kricher and Gordon Morrison (See PFG 50 and 51)
- PFG 46: A Field Guide to Venomous Animals and Poisonous Plants of North America North of Mexico (1994), by Roger Caras and Steven Foster
- PFG 47: More Birding by Ear: Eastern and Central (19??) by Walton and Lawson
- PFG 48: A Field Guide to Geology: Eastern North America (1996), by David C. Roberts; Illustrations by W. Grant Hodson This field guide originally appeared in print with the PFG number 47 on the spine. It was later changed to 48.
- PFG 49: A Field Guide to Warblers of North America (1997), by Jon Dunn, Kimball Garrett, Sue A. Tackett and Larry O. Rosche
- PFG 50: Revision of (part of) PFG 45 as: A Field Guide to California and Pacific Northwest Forests (1998), by John C. Kricher and Gordon Morrison
- PFG 51: Revision of (part of) PFG 45 as: A Field Guide to Rocky Mountain and Southwest Forests (1998), by John C. Kricher and Gordon Morrison

=== Unnumbered volumes ===
- PFG ??: Revision of (part of) Fourth edition of PFG 1 as: A Field Guide to Feeder Birds: Eastern and Central North America (2000), by Roger Tory Peterson, Virginia Marie Peterson, and Noble Proctor
- PFG ??: A Field Guide to Hummingbirds of North America (2001), by Sheri L. Williamson
- PFG ??: A Field Guide to the North American Prairie (2004), by Ruth Carol Cushman and Stephen R. Jones
- PFG ??: Mammals of Britain and Europe (1968, 1986), by F. H. van den Brink
- PFG ??: Peterson Reference Guide to Birding by Impression: A Different Approach to Knowing and Identifying Birds (2015), by Kevin T. Karlson and Dale Rosselet
- PFG ??: Peterson Field Guide to Finding Mammals in North America (2015), by Vladimir Dinets
- PFG ??: Peterson Reference Guide to Owls of North America and the Caribbean (2015), by Scott Weidensaul
- PFG ??: Peterson Reference Guide to Woodpeckers of North America (2016), by Stephen Shunk
- PFG ??: Peterson Field Guide to Birds of Northern Central America (2016), by Jesse Fagan and Robert Dean; Illustrated by Robert Dean and Peter Burke
- PFG ??: Peterson Field Guide to Bird Sounds of Eastern North America (2017), by Nathan Pieplow

== iOS apps ==
Appweavers, Inc., the licensee of the Peterson field guides for mobile devices, has developed the Peterson Birds of North America and Peterson Feeder Birds of North America apps for mobile Apple products. The Peterson Birds of North America app also includes some content from other books in the Peterson field guide series. The app is no longer available on iTunes.
