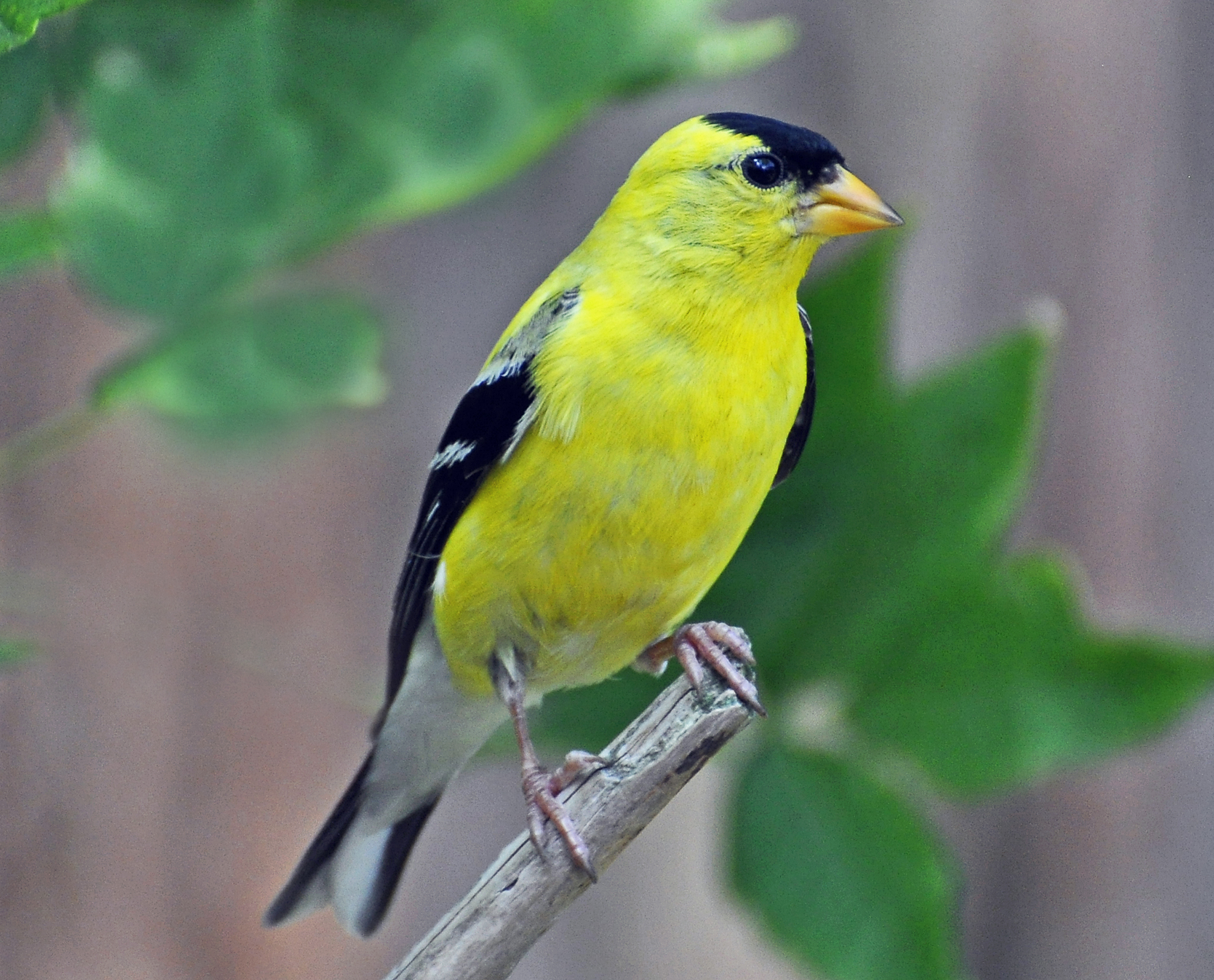
- Male
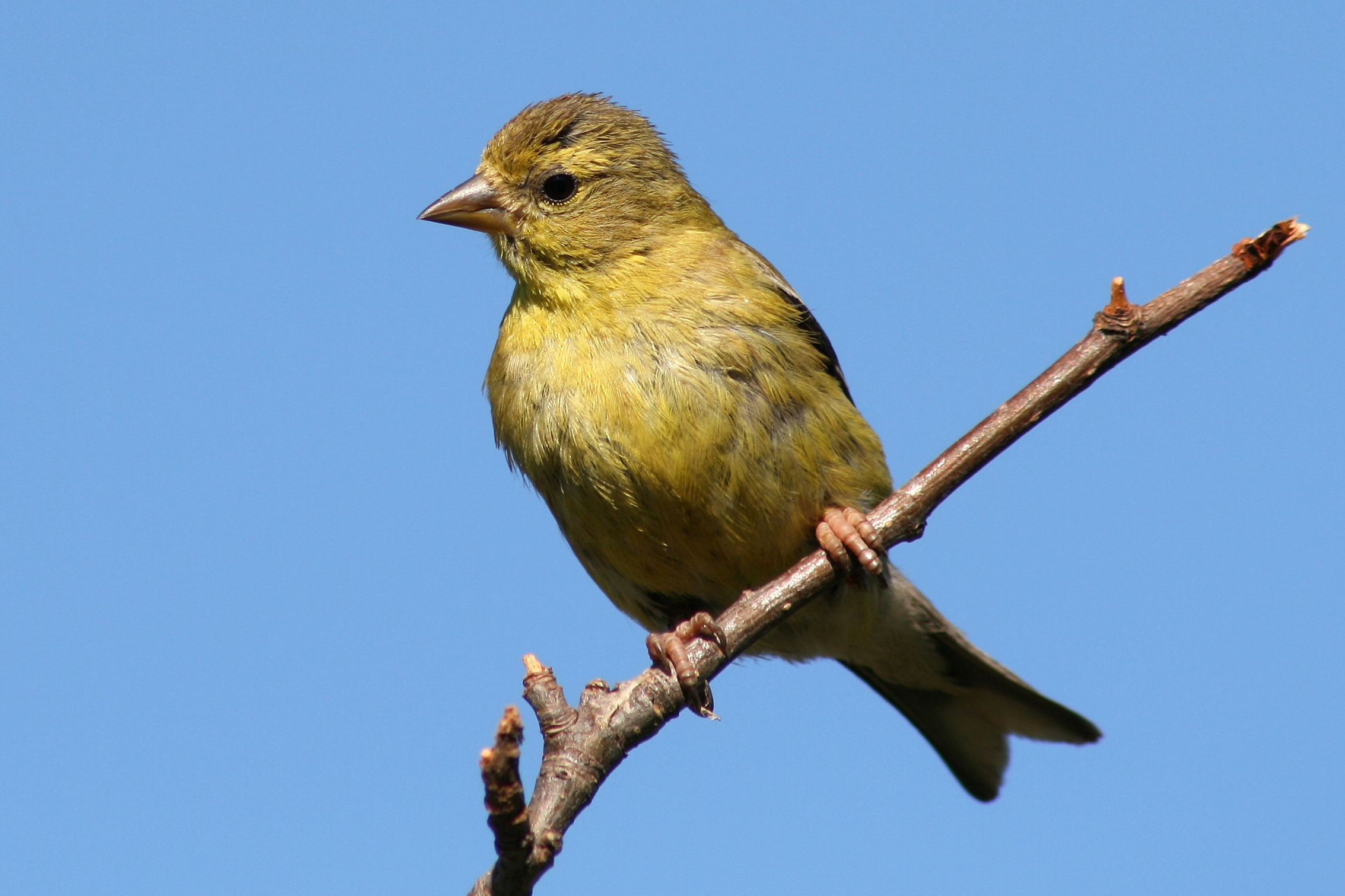
- Female

Conservation status
- Least Concern (IUCN 3.1)

Scientific classification
- Kingdom: Animalia
- Phylum: Chordata
- Class: Aves
- Order: Passeriformes
- Family: Fringillidae
- Subfamily: Carduelinae
- Genus: Spinus
- Species: S. tristis

Binomial name
- Spinus tristis (Linnaeus, 1758)

Subspecies
- S. t. tristis; S. t. pallidus; S. t. jewetti; S. t. salicamans
- Approximate distribution map Breeding Year-round Non-breeding

Synonyms
- Fringilla tristis Linnaeus, 1758; Astragalinus tristis (Linnaeus, 1758); Carduelis tristis (Linnaeus, 1758)

Audio
- American goldfinch call

= American goldfinch =

American goldfinch Temporal range: Late Pleistocene–present

Species of bird

The American goldfinch (Spinus tristis) is a small North American bird in the finch family. It is migratory, ranging from mid-Alberta to North Carolina during the breeding season, and from just south of the Canada–United States border to Mexico during the winter.

The only finch in its subfamily to undergo a complete molt, the American goldfinch displays sexual dichromatism: the male is a vibrant yellow in the summer and an olive color during the winter, while the female is a dull yellow-brown shade which brightens only slightly during the summer. The male displays brightly colored plumage during the breeding season to attract a mate.

The American goldfinch is a granivore and adapted for the consumption of seedheads, with a conical beak to remove the seeds and agile feet to grip the stems of seedheads while feeding. It is a social bird and will gather in large flocks while feeding and migrating. It may behave territorially during nest construction, but this aggression is short-lived. Its breeding season is tied to the peak of food supply, beginning in late July, which is relatively late in the year for a finch. This species is generally monogamous and produces one brood each year.

Human activity has generally benefited the American goldfinch. It is often found in residential areas because it is attracted to bird feeders, which increase its survival rate in these areas. Deforestation also creates open meadow areas, which are its preferred habitat.

== Taxonomy ==
The American goldfinch was one of the many species originally described by Carl Linnaeus in the landmark 1758 10th edition of his work, Systema Naturae, where he classified it in the genus Fringilla. It was later placed in the genus Spinus, a group containing New World goldfinches and siskins. In 1976, Spinus was merged into the genus Carduelis as a subgenus. Recent studies have resurrected the genus Spinus. Its closest relatives are the lesser goldfinch (S. psaltria), Lawrence's goldfinch (S. lawrencei), and the siskins. Although it shares a name with the European goldfinch, the two are in separate genera and are not closely related. Carduelis is derived from carduus, the Latin word for 'thistle'; the species name tristis is Latin for 'sorrowful'. There are four recognized subspecies of the American goldfinch:

- The eastern goldfinch (S. t. tristis) is the most common of the subspecies. Its summer range is from southern Canada to Colorado, and east to the Carolinas. Its winter range is from southern Canada south to Florida and central Mexico.
- The pale goldfinch (S. t. pallidus) is differentiated from other subspecies by its paler body color, stronger white markings and, in males, a larger black cap. It is slightly larger than S. t. tristis. The summer range is from British Columbia to western Ontario, south to Colorado and west to Oregon. In winter, the range extends from southern Canada and northern California, south to Mexico.
- The northwestern goldfinch (S. t. jewetti) is smaller and darker than the other subspecies. It occurs on the coastal slope of the Cascade Mountains from southern British Columbia to central California, overlapping with the range of S. t. pallidus.
- The willow goldfinch (S. t. salicamans) occurs west of the Sierra Nevada range during the summer and in the central and southern Baja California Peninsula to the Mojave Desert and the Colorado Desert in the winter. In winter, the plumage of both sexes is browner than the other subspecies and in summer, the male's black cap is smaller than that of the other subspecies.

== Description ==
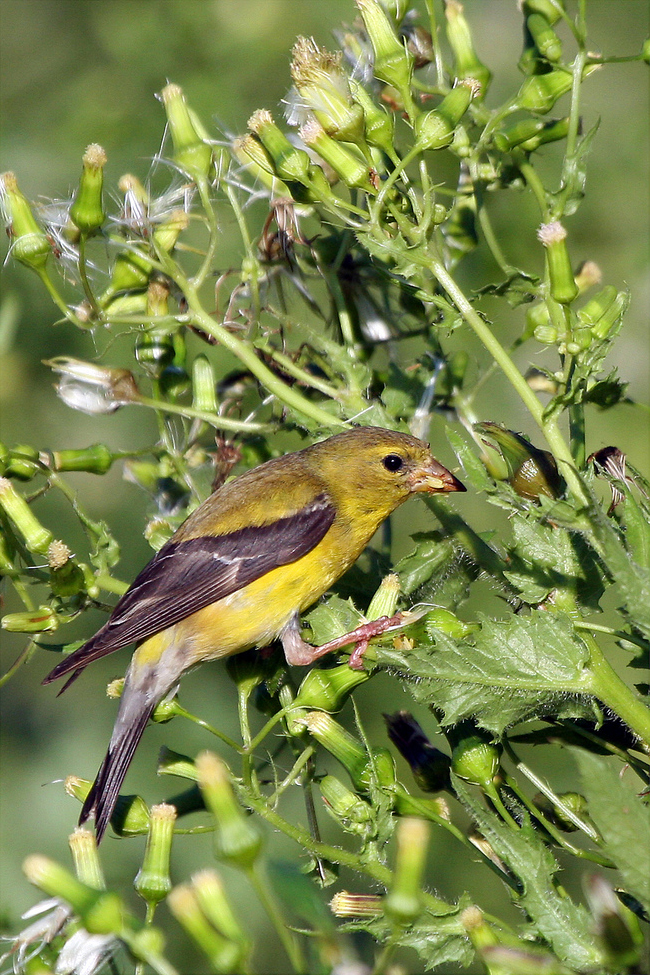
Female

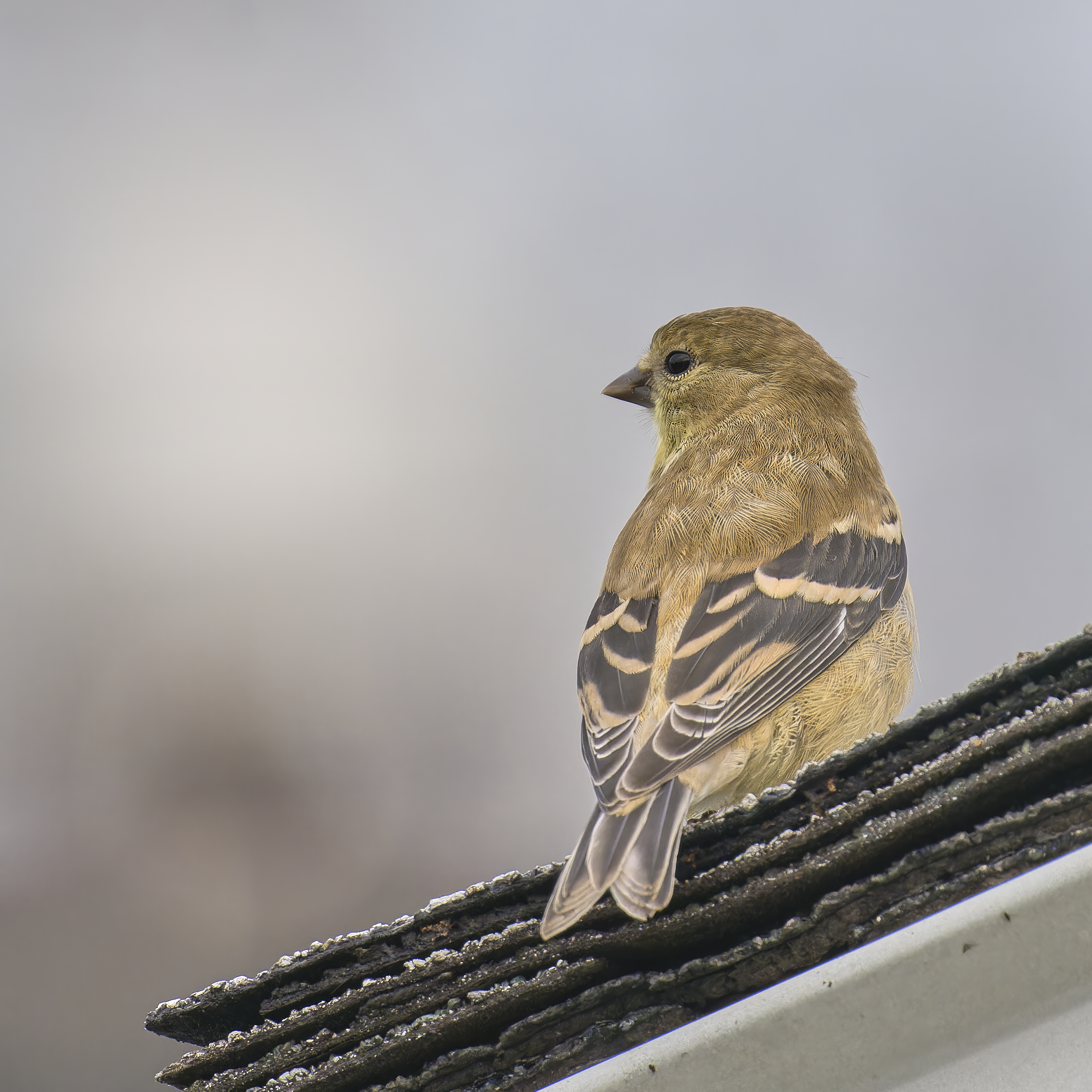
Non-breeding plumage

The American goldfinch is a small finch, 11–14 cm (4.3–5.5 in) long, with a wingspan of 19–22 cm (7.5–8.7 in). It weighs between 11–20 g (0.39–0.71 oz). Among standard measurements, the wing chord is 6.5 to 7.8 cm (2.6 to 3.1 in), the tail is 4.2 to 5.1 cm (1.7 to 2.0 in), the culmen is 0.9 to 1.1 cm (0.35 to 0.43 in) and the tarsus is 1.2 to 1.4 cm (0.47 to 0.55 in). The beak is small, conical, and pink for most of the year, but turns bright orange with the spring molt in both sexes. The shape and size of the beak aid in the extraction of seeds from the seed heads of thistles, sunflowers, and other plants.

The American goldfinch undergoes a molt in the spring and autumn. It is the only cardueline finch to undergo molting twice a year. During the winter molt it sheds all its feathers; in the spring, it sheds all but the wing and tail feathers, which are dark brown in the female and black in the male. The markings on these feathers remain through each molt, with bars on the wings and white under and at the edges of the short, notched tail. The sexual dimorphism displayed in plumage coloration is especially pronounced after the spring molt, when the bright color of the male's summer plumage is needed to attract a mate.

Once the spring molt is complete, the body of the male is a brilliant lemon yellow, a color produced by carotenoid pigments from plant materials in its diet, with a striking jet black cap and white rump that is visible during flight. The female is mostly brown, lighter on the underside with a yellow bib. After the autumn molt, the bright summer feathers are replaced by duller plumage, becoming buff below and olive-brown above, with a pale yellow face and bib. The autumn plumage is almost identical in both sexes, but the male has yellow shoulder patches.

The immature bird has a dull brown back, and the underside is pale yellow. The shoulders and tail are a dull black with buff-colored, rather than white, markings on wings and rump. This coloration is the same in both sexes.

The song is a series of musical warbles and twitters, often with a long note. A tsee-tsi-tsi-tsit call is often given in flight; it may also be described as per-chic-o-ree. While the female incubates the eggs, she calls to her returning mate with a soft continuous tee-tee-tee-tee-tee sound. The young begin to use a call of chick-kee or chick-wee shortly before fledging, which they use until they have left the nest entirely. There are two defense calls made by adults during nesting; a sweet call made to rally other goldfinches to the nest and distract predators, and a bearbee used to signal to the nestlings to quiet them and get them to crouch down in the nest to become less conspicuous.

== Distribution and habitat ==
The American goldfinch prefers open country where weeds thrive, such as fields, meadows, flood plains, as well as roadsides, orchards, and gardens. It may also be found in open deciduous and riparian woodlands and areas of secondary growth. This habitat preference continues during the spring and autumn migrations.

The summer breeding range stretches across North America from coast to coast. It is bounded on the north by Saskatchewan and stretches south across North America to North Carolina on the east coast, and northern California on the west coast. The American goldfinch is a short-distance migrant, moving south in response to colder weather and lessened food supply. According to ornithologist Marc Parnell, this responsive, southerly migratory pattern is thought to begin to occur as daily low temperatures approach freezing, and particularly as these temperatures near 0 °F. The migration is completed in compact flocks, which travel in an erratic, wavelike flight pattern.

Its winter range includes southern Canada and stretches south through the United States to parts of Mexico. In winter, in the northern part of its range, the finch may move nearer to feeders if they are available. In southern ranges, during winter, they remain in areas like fields and flood plains where they live during the summer months.

Attempts were made to introduce the American goldfinch into Bermuda in the 19th century and Tahiti in 1938, but the species failed to become established in either place.

== Behavior ==
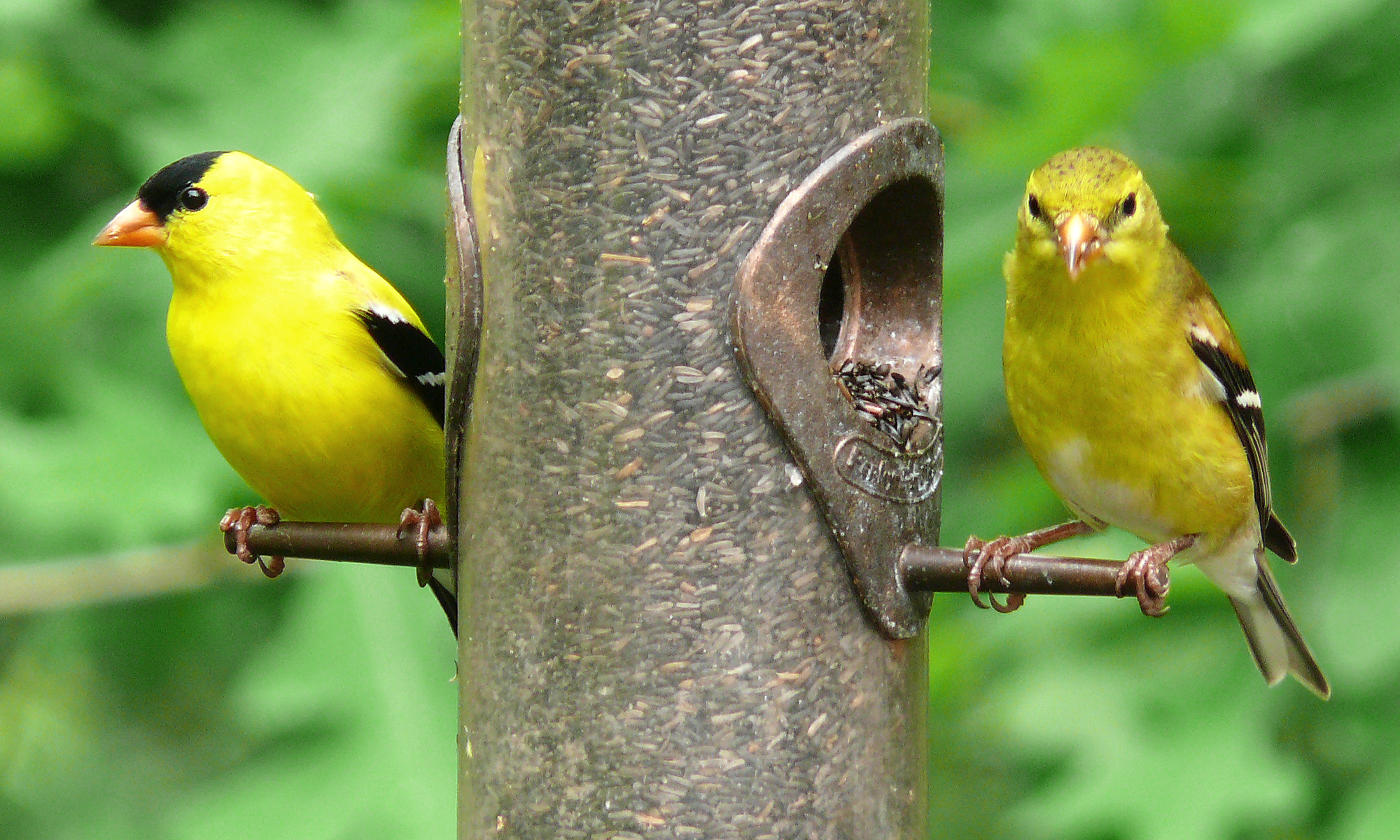
Male (left) and female (right) at a thistle feeder

Eating coneflower seeds and taking flight, including slow motion.

Eating hyssop seed

The American goldfinch flies in a distinctive undulating pattern, creating a wave-shaped path. This normally consists of a series of wing beats to lift the bird, then folding in the wings and gliding in an arc before repeating the pattern. Birds often vocalize during the flapping phase of the pattern and then go silent during the coasting phase. The call made during flight is "per-twee-twee-twee", or "ti-di-di-di", punctuated by the silent periods. They communicate with several distinct vocalizations, including one that sounds like "po-ta-to-chip" to the listener.

Birds do not act aggressively toward predators within their territory; their only reaction is alarm calling. Predators include snakes, weasels, squirrels, and blue jays, which may destroy eggs or kill young, and hawks and cats, which pose a threat to both young and adults. The oldest known American goldfinch was 10 years and 5 months old.

=== Sociality ===
The American goldfinch is gregarious during the nonbreeding season when it is often found in large flocks, usually with other finches. The social hierarchy, measured (in captivity) by how many aggressive encounters are won by each individual, tends towards the male being dominant in the nonbreeding season. During the breeding season, this finch lives in loose colonies. While the nest is being constructed, the male will act aggressively toward other males who intrude into his territory, driving them away, and the female reacts in the same way toward other females. This aggressiveness subsides once the eggs have been laid. The social hierarchy in the breeding season generally has the female dominant over the male. Dominance may change based on the value of a resource; a study published in 1987 found that starved subordinate birds were sometimes dominant in competitions over feeder access.

Birds indicate their level of aggression through a range of displays. The head-up display, where the neck and legs are slightly extended, shows mild aggression and is often performed by the victor of an encounter. The carpals-raised display has the neck retracted and the carpals raised; displayers are likely to attack their opponent. The head-forward display is where the legs are flexed, the neck extended, and the beak closed. At higher intensities, the neck is lowered, the beak is pointed at the opponent, and one or both wings are raised. In extreme cases, the neck is retracted, the bill opened, the body feathers sleeked, and the tail is fanned and raised slightly. Aggression is also displayed by showing the front of the body to another individual. Attacks include pecking at feathers, supplanting the opponent by landing next to it, and flying vertically with legs and feet extended, beaks open, and necks extended. Avoidance behaviors include showing only the side of the body to an aggressor, leaning away, and flexing the legs, retracting the neck, and pointing the beak down.

=== Breeding ===
The breeding season begins later in the year than for any other finch and later than any other native North American bird, besides occasionally the sedge wren. This may be related to the abundance of seeds in the late summer months, as seeds represent most of their diet.

The courtship rituals include aerial maneuvers and singing by males, who begin courtship in late July. The flight displays begin as the male pursues the female, who flies in zigzagging evasive patterns. The male can signal his quality and fitness, both in the short term (current body condition) and long term (genes), through ornamentation (bill color and plumage). If a female accepts the male as a mate, the pair will fly in wide circles, as the male warbles throughout the flight.

Once a male has found a mate, he selects a territory, marking the boundaries by warbling as he flies from perch to perch. After circling the perimeter, he performs two flight displays, first repeating a low, flat flight, then flying in an exaggerated version of normal flight, tucking his wings close to his body, plummeting earthwards and catching himself as he spreads his wings to glide upward in a series of loops. Two or three pairs may group their territories together in a loose colony, perhaps to aid in defense against predators.

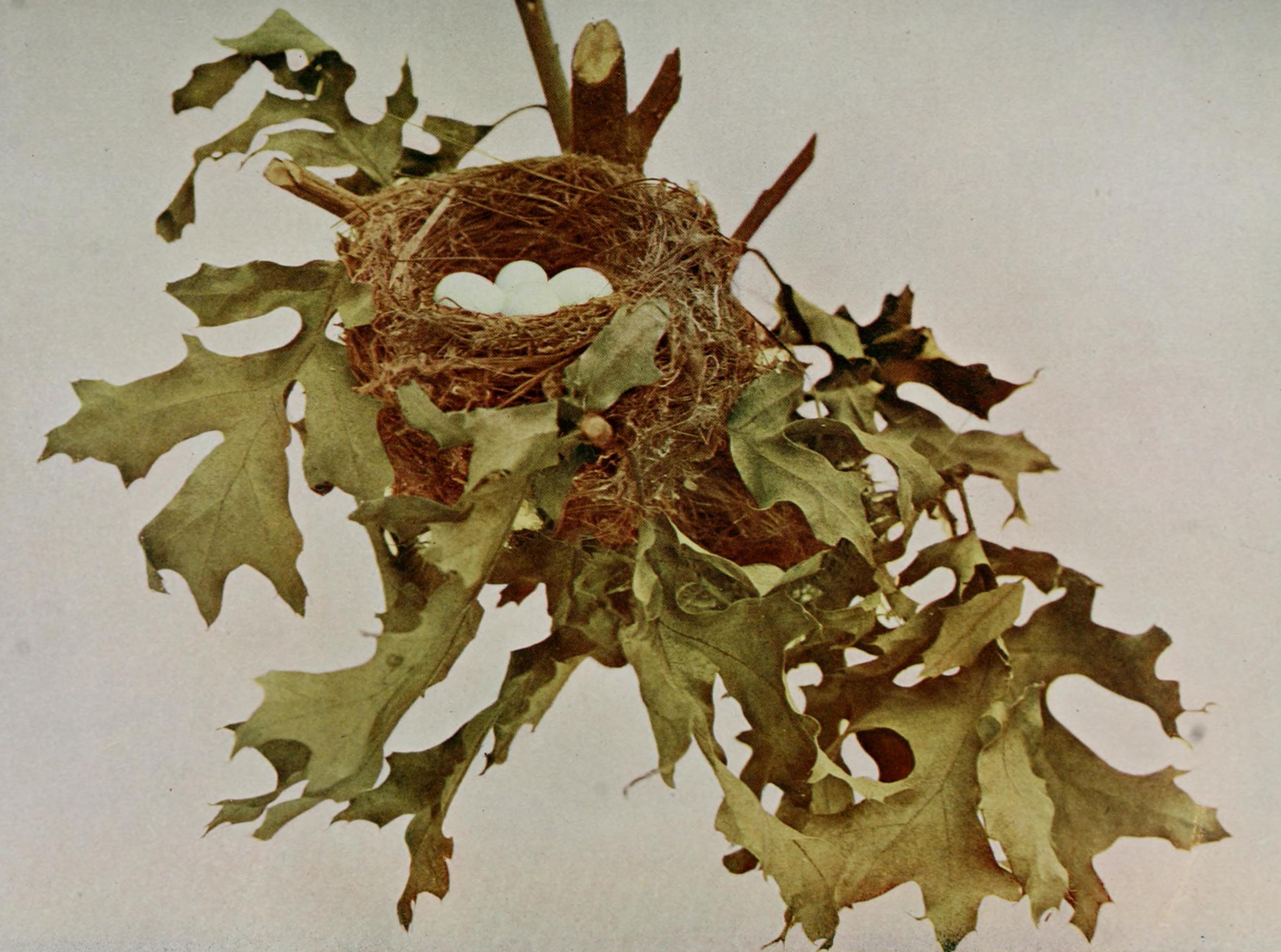
Nest

The nest is built in late summer by the female in the branches of a deciduous shrub or tree at a height of up to 10 m (33 ft). The nest-building lasts approximately six days, during which time the female works in 10–40 minute increments. The male frequently flies with the female as she collects nesting materials, and though he may carry some materials back to the nest, he leaves its construction to the female. The outer shell of the nest is built of bark, weeds, vines, and grass. The inside diameter of the finished nest is about 6.5 cm (2.6 in). The rim is reinforced with bark bound by spiderwebs and caterpillar silk, and the cup is lined with plant down from milkweed, thistle, or cattail. The nest is so tightly woven that it can hold water, and it is possible for nestlings to drown following a rainstorm if the parents do not cover the nest.

The clutch is four to six bluish-white eggs, which are oval in shape and about 16 mm × 12 mm (0.63 in × 0.47 in), roughly the size of a peanut. It is thought that they are laid during the night. The eggs are incubated by the female alone, though the male brings her food as she nests, and most mating pairs raise only one brood each year.

The chicks hatch 12–14 days after incubation begins. Like all passerines, the chicks are altricial: they are hatched naked, with reddish bodies, pale grey down, and closed eyes. The mother bird feeds her young regurgitated seeds and insects as they grow. The hatchlings develop quickly, opening their eyes after three days and completing the growth of olive-brown juvenile plumage after 11–15 days, at which time they begin to practice short flights close to the nest. For up to three weeks after fledging, they are still fed by the male, who locates them by listening for their fledging call. The chicks stop giving this call when they become entirely independent.

The American goldfinch is occasionally victim to brood parasites, particularly brown-headed cowbirds. One study found that 9% of nests had brown-headed cowbird eggs in them. It likely evades parasitism partly because of its late breeding season. The American goldfinch also makes a very poor host for brood parasites, with studies showing low hatching rates of brown-headed cowbird eggs and no fledging success. This is despite the lack of known behavioral adaptations against brood parasites in this finch. It is thought that the inability of brown-headed cowbird chicks to survive is due to a failure to get enough nutrition; the seed-rich diet of American goldfinch chicks varies from the usual insect-rich diet of other hosts.

=== Feeding ===
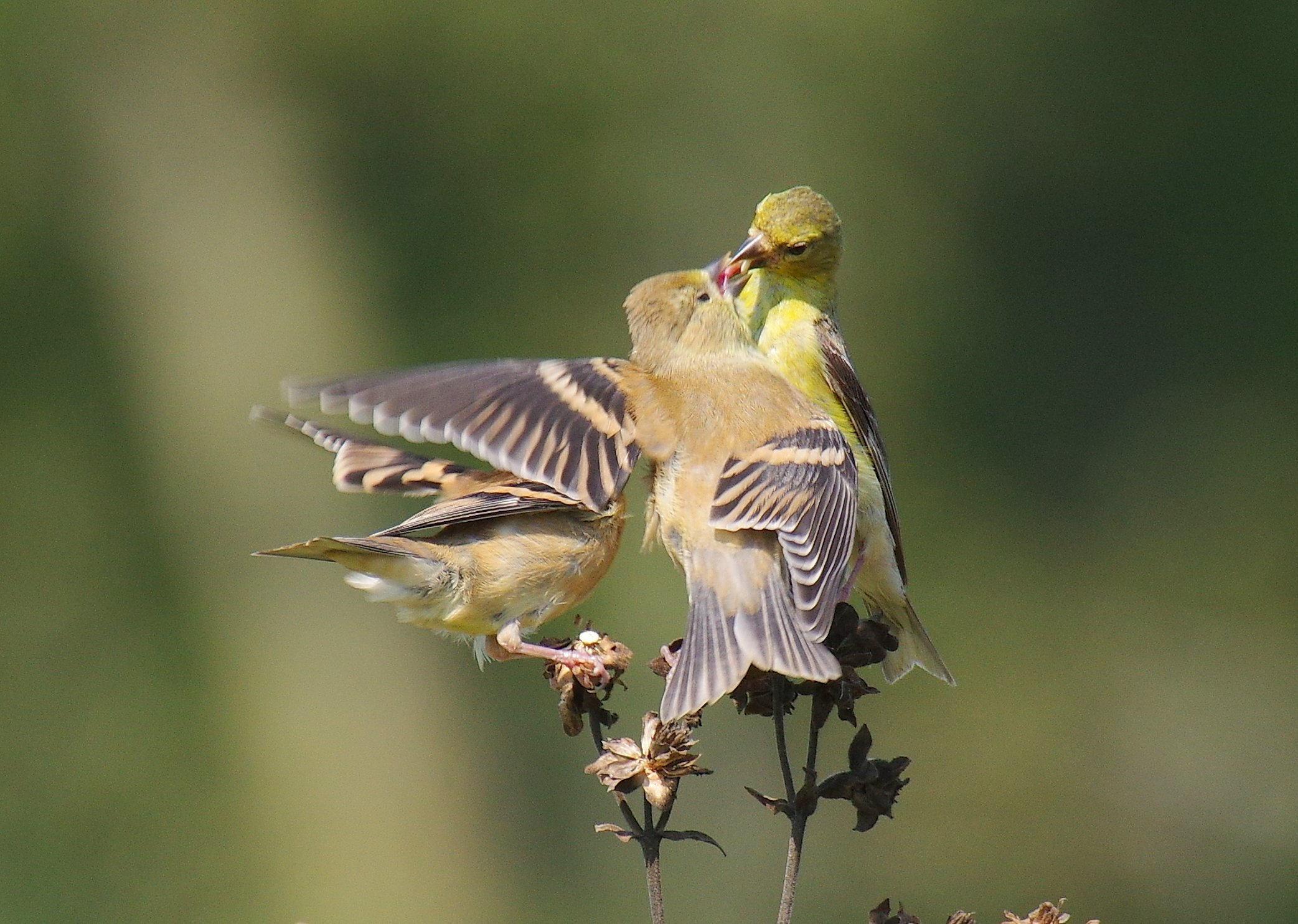
Feeding

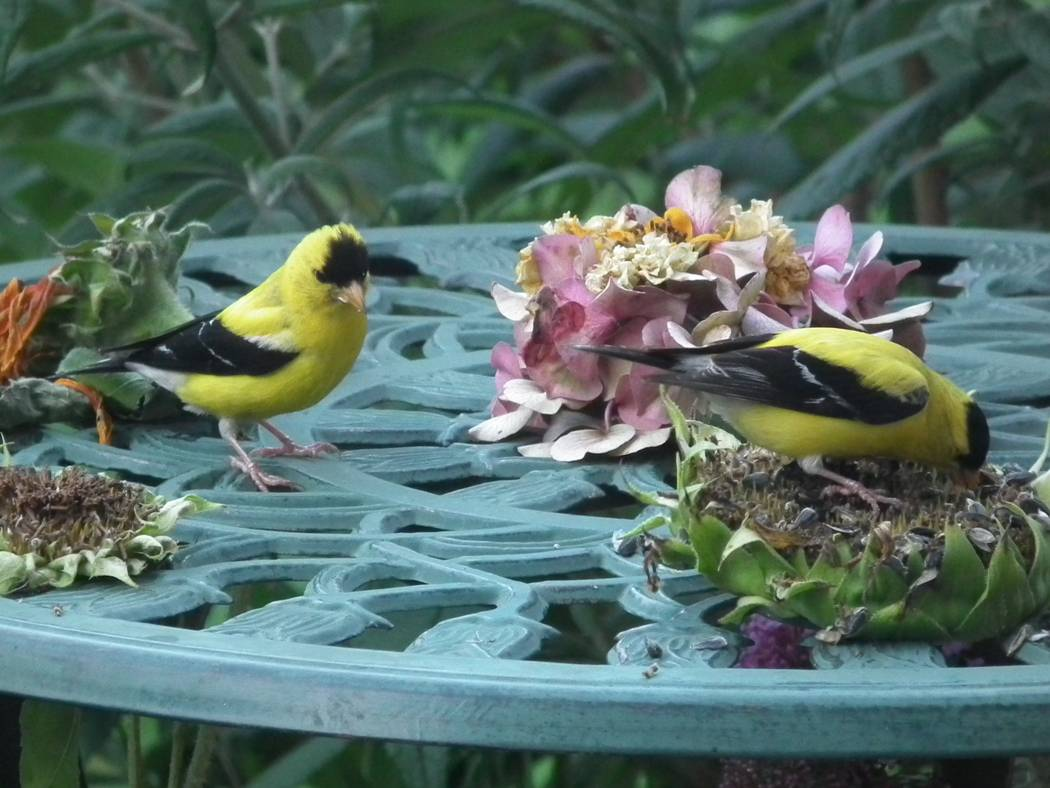
Feeding from sunflower heads

The American goldfinch is a diurnal feeder. According to the Cornell Lab of Ornithology, the species is one of the strictest vegetarians in the bird world. It is mainly granivorous, but will occasionally eat insects, which are also fed to its young to provide protein. Its diet consists of the seeds from a wide variety of plants, often those of weeds, grasses, and trees, such as thistle, teasel, dandelion, ragweed, mullein, cosmos, goatsbeard, sunflower, and alder. However, it also consumes tree buds, maple sap, and berries. It will eat at bird feeders provided by humans, particularly in the winter months, preferring Niger seed (commonly and erroneously called thistle seed).

Unlike some finch species, the American goldfinch uses its feet extensively in feeding. It frequently hangs from seedheads while feeding to reach the seeds more easily. In the spring, the American goldfinch feeds on the catkins hanging from birches and alders by pulling one up with its beak and using its toes to hold the catkin still against the branch. This dexterity enables it to take advantage of food sources relatively inaccessible to potential competitors, increasing its chances of survival.

== Status ==
The American goldfinch has a large range, with an estimated global extent of about 7,900,000 km^{2} (3,100,000 sq mi), though its population (42–47 million mature individuals) is expected to be decreasing. The species is evaluated as least concern on the 2025 IUCN Red List.

== Relationship with humans ==
The American goldfinch is found in residential areas throughout its range. Backyard birders attract it using feeders containing niger seed or by planting grasses and perennial plants, such as zinnias, cosmos, bee balm, or globe thistle, which produce seedheads favored by finches.

The American goldfinch is not threatened by human activity and is widespread throughout its range. The clearing of forests by humans, though harmful to many species, has benefited the American goldfinch. Clearing of woodlands causes declines in numbers of neotropical migrants while favoring short-distance migrants and permanent residents. This benefits the American goldfinch both because it is a short-distance migrant and because the created open areas are the preferred environment of the bird, where weeds thrive which produce the primary food source of the American goldfinch.

== State bird ==
The American goldfinch is the state bird of Iowa and New Jersey, where it is called the eastern goldfinch, and Washington, where it is called the willow goldfinch. It was chosen by schoolchildren in Washington in 1951.
