= Lee Allen Peterson =

Naturalist and author

Naturalist Lee Allen Peterson is the author of A Field Guide to Edible Wild Plants of Eastern and Central North America, a leading reference in survivalist foraging and cooking with wild plants. The book is illustrated with photographs by Peterson, as well as line drawings by both him and his father, Roger Tory Peterson.

Peterson also provided the foreword for the 2008 edition of the most popular of the Peterson field guides, The Peterson Field Guide to Birds of North America.

Lee Allen Peterson studied natural science at Johns Hopkins University.
