= Virginia Marie Peterson =

American research chemist and nature field guide author (1935–2001)

- Born: Virginia Marie Westervelt; May 30, 1925; Boston, Massachusetts, US
- Died: April 15, 2001 (aged 75); Old Lyme, Connecticut, US
- Resting place: Duck River Cemetery, Old Lyme, Connecticut, US
- Occupation: research chemist, nature field guide author
- Spouse: Roger Tory Peterson

Virginia Marie Peterson was the wife of Roger Tory Peterson, founder of the popular Peterson Field Guide series, and contributor to many books in that series They wed in 1976, both having been previously married and divorced, she once and him twice. At the time of their marriage, Roger Tory Peterson was a well known naturalist, artist and the author of fourteen books including popular field guides to birds and many other taxonomic groups, including trees, flowering plants, ferns, mammals and insects.

Virginia Peterson contributed the first set of species range maps to the updated fifth edition of A Field Guide to the Birds. The first guide in the popular Peterson Field Guide series was published in 1934. The introduction of the range maps was reflected in the copyright of this and the updated field guide in the series for western birds, with her range maps, being expanded to include Virginia Peterson.

== Range Maps in Ornithology and Conservation Biology ==
When Virginia Peterson first developed and introduced range maps for birds to birdwatchers, ornithologist and conservation biologists, satellite data and digital maps were not publicly available, and GPS tracking with geolocators in ornithology and ecology was not yet developed. With increasing affordability range maps have become an important tool in conservation biology. In addition, the location metadata on photographs taken with smartphones, has allowed citizen scientists to upload information to databases such as e-bird to support interactive range maps.

== Awards ==
- 2001 Roger Tory Peterson Medal, Harvard Museum of Natural History, Harvard University

== Publications ==
Peterson, R. T. and Peterson, V. M. (2002). Peterson Field Guide to Birds of Eastern and Central North America. Fifth Edition. United States: Houghton Mifflin Harcourt.

Peterson, R. T. and Peterson, V. M. (1999). A Field Guide to the Birds: Eastern and Central North America: Large Format Edition. United States: Houghton Mifflin. ISBN 978-0-395-96371-5

Peterson, R. T. and Peterson, V. M. (1990). A Field Guide to Western Birds: A Completely New Guide to Field Marks of All Species Found in North America West of the 100th Meridian and North of Mexico. Third Edition. Boston, New York USA: Houghton Mifflin. ISBN 978-0-618-13218-8

Peterson, R. T. and Peterson, V. M. (1983) Audubon's Birds of America: The National Audubon Society Baby Elephant Folio. United States: Abbeville Press, Incorporated.
