= Donald J. Borror =

American entomologist

- Born: August 24, 1907; Shepard
- Died: April 28, 1988
- Education: Ohio State University, Otterbein University
- Occupations: Entomologist, scientific collector
- Employer: Ohio State University

Donald Joyce Borror (August 24, 1907 – April 28, 1988) was an American entomologist and a pioneer of bioacoustics. He is famous for co-authoring a comprehensive textbook of entomology titled An Introduction to the Study of Insects which continues to be in print with newer editions. An entomologist with a specialization in the Odonata (dragonflies and damselflies), he also took a great interest in animal sounds and published numerous studies on bird vocalization. A longtime professor of entomology at the Ohio State University, he was a fellow of the American Ornithologists' Union as well as the Entomological Society of America.

Borror was born in the neighborhood of Shepard, Columbus, Ohio, the second son of Reverend Charles H. Borror. He studied at Otterbein College before joining the Ohio State University from where he obtained a BSc in 1928, an MSc in 1930 and a PhD in 1935. During the Second World War, he served in the navy intelligence where he may have learned about the use of a "vibralyzer" a system developed by the Kay Electric Company (founded by former Bell Labs engineers Harry Foster and Elmo Crump) for generating visual representations of speech. After the war Borror took an interest in avian vocalizations and in 1947 he obtained a "portable", in that it had a handle, recorder that weighed 30 pounds and had a 250 foot long power cord. Along with Carl R. Reese, he was the first to publish sonograms (he called them "vibragrams") of bird calls in 1953. Over 15,000 animal sounds were recorded over the years and are now stored in the Borror Laboratory of Bioacoustics.

In 1953, Borror published along with Dwight M. DeLong, a textbook of entomology that was highly influential. Later editions were written by additional authors Charles Triplehorn and Norman F. Johnson. Other books by Borror included one on Greek and Latin names in biology (1960). In 1970, Borror co-authored a very popular field guide to North American insects as part of the Peterson Field Guides series that remained in print for over thirty years.
