= Shepard, Columbus, Ohio =

Shepard
- Neighborhood of Columbus
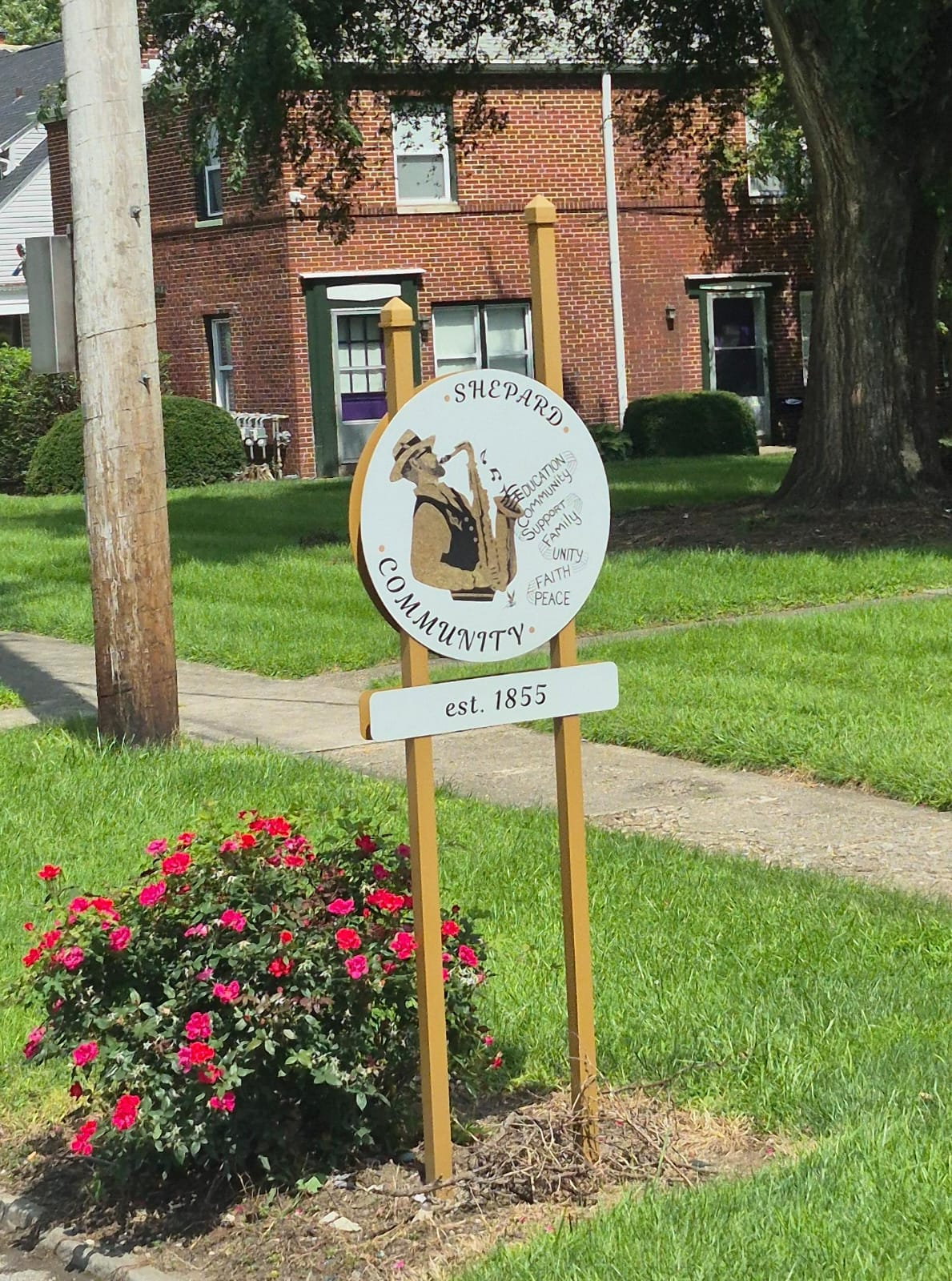
- Shepard Community neighborhood sign
- Country: United States
- State: Ohio
- County: Franklin
- City: Columbus
- Developed: 1850s
- Annexed by Columbus: 1910
- Named after: Dr. William Shepard
- Time zone: UTC−5 (Eastern (EST))
  - Summer (DST): UTC−4 (EDT)
- Area code(s): 614 and 380

Shepard is a neighborhood in Columbus, Ohio, United States, located northeast of Downtown Columbus along Alum Creek. The community developed in the mid-19th century around a water-cure institution established by physician William Shepard. The surrounding settlement became known as Shepard Station and later simply as Shepard.

Historically a small settlement outside Columbus, Shepard developed around the sanitarium, transportation routes and industries along Alum Creek. The settlement included an ice company and was served by rail and later electric transportation. Shepard Station was annexed by Columbus in 1910. The community's historic identity survives in the names of the Shepard Branch of the Columbus Metropolitan Library, Shepard Park and other neighborhood institutions.

== History ==
=== Origins and Shepard's Water Cure ===
The community's development is closely associated with physician William Shepard. In the early 1850s, Shepard established the Water Cure and Medical Infirmary along Alum Creek east of Columbus.

Historical accounts give slightly different dates for the establishment of the institution. The Lower Alum Creek Watershed Action Plan dates the Water Cure and Medical Infirmary to approximately 1853, while the Columbus Metropolitan Library dates the opening of Shepard's Water Cure Sanitarium to 1855.

The institution practiced hydrotherapy, part of the 19th-century water-cure movement. Shepard's institution became sufficiently prominent that the surrounding community took his name. The settlement became known as Shepard Station or simply Shepard.

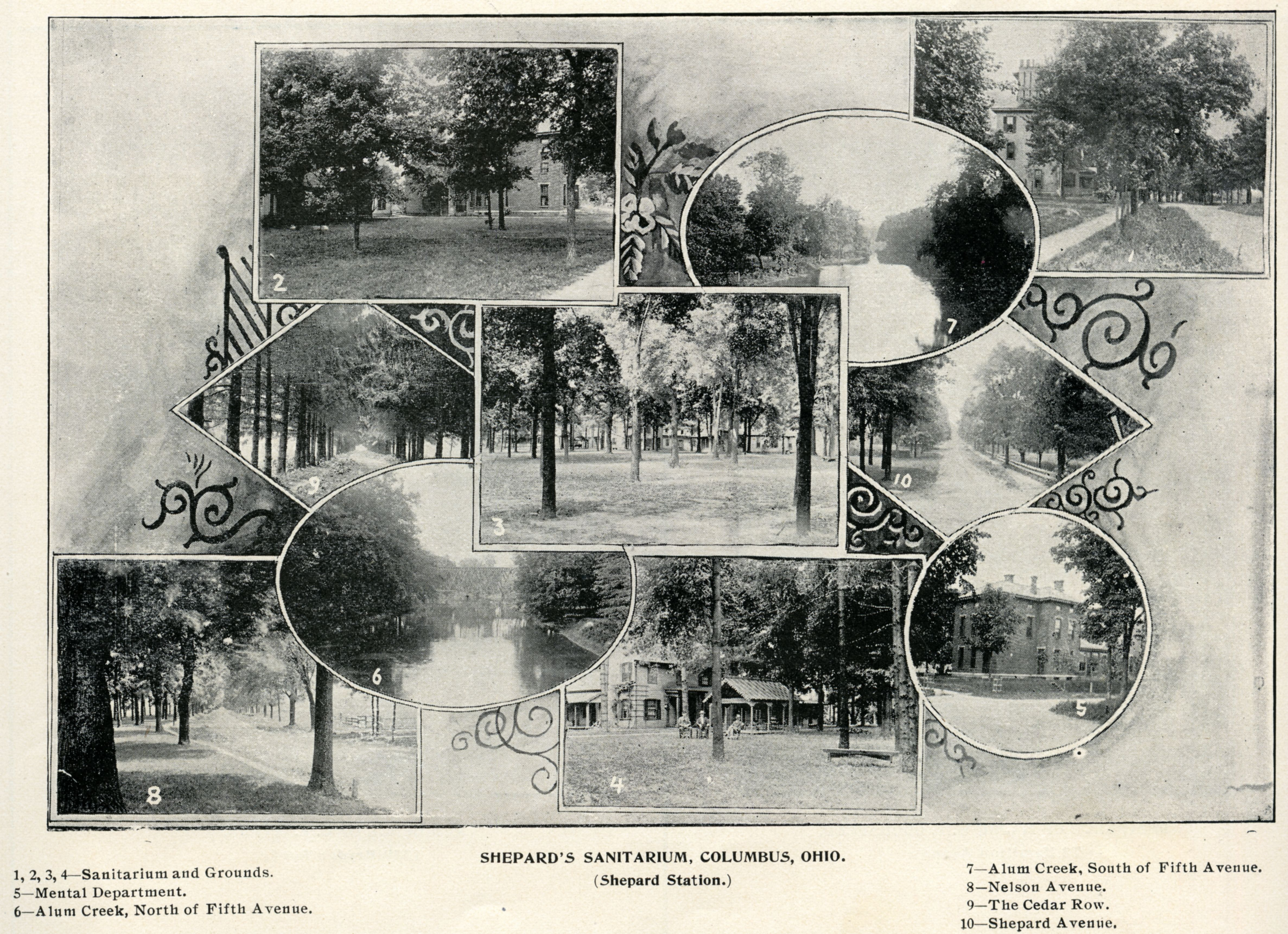
Shepard's Sanitarium

=== Growth of Shepard Station ===
During the latter half of the 19th century, the settlement surrounding the sanitarium developed into a small community along the Alum Creek corridor. The historic settlement was centered along Fifth Avenue between Nelson and Sunbury roads.

Transportation contributed to the community's development. The name Shepard Station reflected the community's association with rail transportation. By the early 20th century, the Shepard Sanitarium was accessible from central Columbus by the Columbus, New Albany and Johnstown electric line.

Margaret Avenue was formerly known as Shepard Street, preserving another connection to the settlement's earlier name.

=== Ice industry ===
Alum Creek influenced the development and economy of early Shepard. In addition to providing the setting for Shepard's water-cure establishment, the area became home to a substantial ice business.

The Lower Alum Creek Watershed Action Plan describes Shepard Station as the site of both Shepard's Sanitarium and a large ice company. The ice operation was among the enterprises historically associated with the community and the Alum Creek corridor.

=== McMillen Sanitarium ===
Another medical institution developed from Shepard's sanitarium during the late 19th century. Physician Bishop McMillen became associated with William Shepard in 1894 and directed a department devoted to mental diseases.

The operation later became known as the McMillen Sanitarium. Historical material from the Columbus Metropolitan Library describes it as beginning in 1894 as an expansion of Shepard's Sanitarium and becoming a separate institution in 1902.

The medical institutions contributed to Shepard's long association with health-care facilities.

=== Annexation and early 20th century ===
Shepard Station was annexed by the city of Columbus in 1910. Although incorporation into the expanding city ended Shepard's existence as a separate settlement, the Shepard name continued to identify the surrounding community.

During the early 20th century, residential development and local institutions became increasingly integrated into Columbus while the historic Shepard name remained in use.

=== Later history of the Shepard Sanitarium site ===
William Shepard died in 1914, and Shepard's Sanitarium closed in 1918.

The former sanitarium property subsequently served several institutional uses during the 20th century. The facility served as the Big Brothers and Sisters Home from 1919 to 1952 and as the Columbus Children's Psychiatric Center from 1953 to 1973. The final organization to occupy the building was the Uhuru Drug Center.

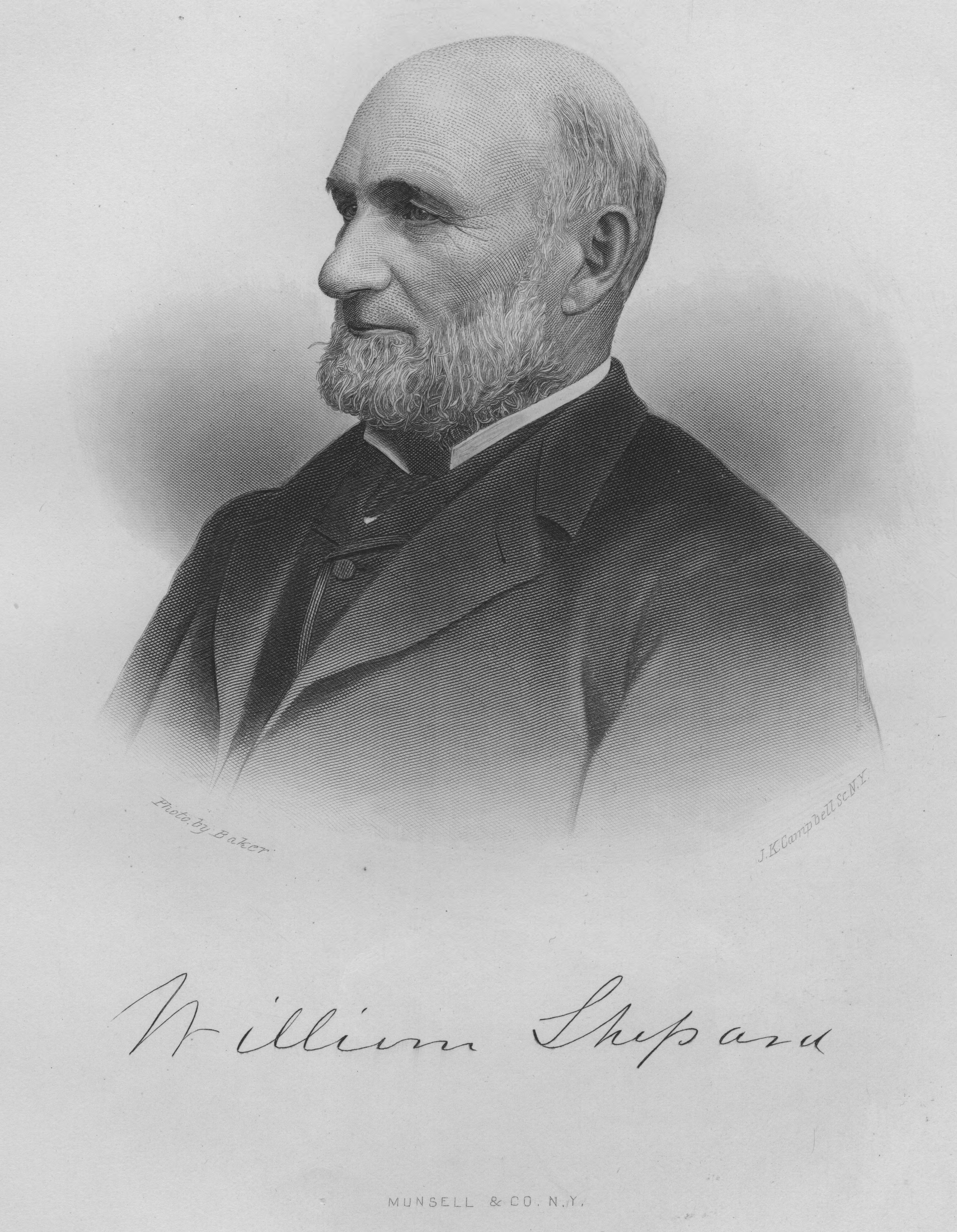
Dr. William Shepard, physician and founder of the water-cure sanitarium around which the Shepard community developed.

The historic sanitarium building was destroyed by fire in October 1981. A Shepard Branch of the Columbus Metropolitan Library subsequently opened on the site in 1985.

== Geography ==
Shepard is located northeast of downtown Columbus along the Alum Creek corridor. The historic settlement of Shepard Station was centered along East Fifth Avenue between Nelson and Sunbury roads.

The neighborhood's identity has historically been closely connected with Alum Creek. The creek influenced the location of Shepard's water-cure institution and the development of local industry.

Modern transportation construction substantially changed the landscape surrounding the historic community. Interstate 670 passes immediately south of the neighborhood.

== Community institutions and landmarks ==
=== Shepard Branch Library ===
The Columbus Metropolitan Library opened its first Shepard Branch on February 1, 1939, at 2185 East Fifth Avenue. The branch's name reflects the history of the surrounding community and William Shepard's sanitarium.

A later Shepard Branch opened on the former sanitarium property in 1985.

The present Shepard Branch is located at 850 North Nelson Road. The 10,000-square-foot (930 m²) building was dedicated on October 13, 2016, replacing a 6,000-square-foot (560 m²) facility. It was designed by the Columbus architectural firm Moody Nolan.

The building received a Merit Award from AIA Columbus in 2017 and an Honor Award from AIA Ohio in 2018.

The library continues to emphasize the history of the surrounding neighborhood through local-history programming, including neighborhood history walking tours.

=== Shepard Park and Alum Creek ===
Shepard's location along Alum Creek connects the neighborhood with recreational facilities and the regional trail network. The Shepard Branch Library is located near the Alum Creek corridor.

In 2025, the Columbus Metropolitan Library and Columbus Recreation and Parks announced a collaboration to transform a portion of the Alum Creek Trail alongside the Shepard Branch into an interactive park highlighting the area's historical significance along the Underground Railroad.

=== Community activities ===
The Shepard Branch and local organizations have supported programs devoted to the history of Shepard and surrounding neighborhoods. In February 2025, the branch hosted Shepard History Day, which included programs concerning the Underground Railroad in central Ohio, neighborhood history, oral-history preservation and longtime Shepard resident Aminah Brenda Lynn Robinson.

== Notable people ==
- Donald J. Borror (1907–1988), entomologist, ornithologist and pioneer in the field of bioacoustics, was born in Shepard. Borror became a longtime professor at Ohio State University and was known for his work in entomology and animal sound recording.

== Legacy ==
Although Shepard Station was annexed by Columbus more than a century ago, the historic community name remains in use. It is preserved most prominently by the Shepard neighborhood and the Shepard Branch of the Columbus Metropolitan Library.

The Columbus Metropolitan Library maintains historical materials documenting Shepard's development and Shepard's Sanitarium. Historic images of the community and sanitarium have also been digitized and made available through local-history collections.

The library has included Shepard in its neighborhood-history programming, including walking tours exploring the historical development of Columbus neighborhoods.

== See also ==
- Neighborhoods in Columbus, Ohio
- History of Columbus, Ohio
- Alum Creek (Ohio)
