= Peterson Identification System =

The Peterson Identification System is a practical method for the field identification of animals, plants and other natural phenomena. It was devised by ornithologist Roger Tory Peterson in 1934 for the first of his series of Field Guides (See Peterson Field Guides.) Peterson devised his system "so that live birds could be identified readily at a distance by their 'field marks' without resorting to the bird-in-hand characters that the early collectors relied on. During the last half century the binocular and the spotting scope have replaced the shotgun." As such, it both reflected and contributed to awareness of the emerging early environmental movement. Another application of this system was made when Roger Tory Peterson was enlisted in the US Army Corps of Engineers from 1943 to 1945. “...plane identification—the aircraft spotting technique—was based on Roger’s bird identification method-the Peterson system.”.

== The system ==
Created for use by amateur naturalists and laymen, rather than specialists, the "Peterson System" is essentially a pictorial key based upon readily noticed visual impressions rather than on the technical features of interest to scientists. The technique involves patternistic drawings with arrows that pinpoint the key field comparisons between similar species.

== Influence ==
Since the first Peterson Field Guide, the system has been expanded to about three dozen volumes in the series as well as being emulated by many other publishers and authors of field guides. It has become the near-universally accepted standard, first in the United States and Europe and then around the world.
