= Field guide =

Book for identifying wildlife

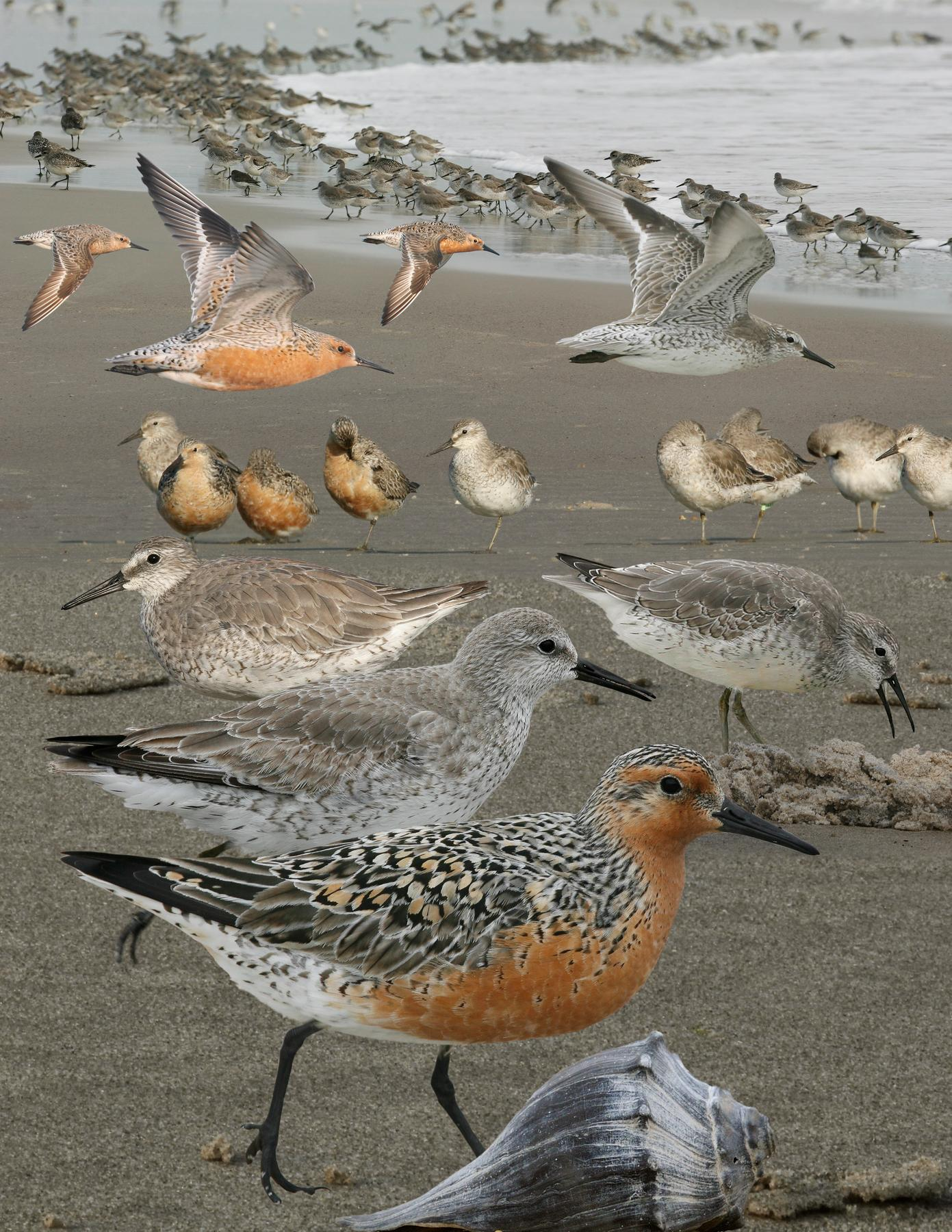
A species plate from The Crossley ID Guide: Eastern Birds, illustrating different plumages of the red knot

A field guide is a book designed to help the reader identify wildlife (flora or fauna or funga) or other objects of natural occurrence (e.g. rocks and minerals). It is generally designed to be brought into the "field" or local area where such objects exist to help distinguish between similar objects. Field guides are often designed to help users distinguish animals and plants that may be similar in appearance but are not necessarily closely related.

It will typically include a description of the objects covered, together with paintings or photographs and an index. More serious and scientific field identification books, including those intended for students, will probably include identification keys to assist with identification, but the publicly accessible field guide is more often a browsable picture guide organized by family, colour, shape, location or other descriptors.

== History ==
Popular interests in identifying things in nature probably were strongest in bird and plant guides. Perhaps the first popular field guide to plants in the United States was the 1893 How to Know the Wildflowers by "Mrs. William Starr Dana" (Frances Theodora Parsons). In 1890, Florence Merriam published Birds Through an Opera-Glass, describing 70 common species. Focused on living birds observed in the field, the book is considered the first in the tradition of modern, illustrated bird guides. In 1902, now writing as Florence Merriam Bailey (having married the zoologist Vernon Bailey), she published Handbook of Birds of the Western United States. By contrast, the Handbook is designed as a comprehensive reference for the lab rather a portable book for the field. It was arranged by taxonomic order and had clear descriptions of species size, distribution, feeding, and nesting habits.

From this point into the 1930s, features of field guides were introduced by Chester A. Reed and others such as changing the size of the book to fit the pocket, including colour plates, and producing guides in uniform editions that covered subjects such as garden and woodland flowers, mushrooms, insects, and dogs.

In 1934, Roger Tory Peterson, using his fine skill as an artist, changed the way modern field guides approached identification. Using color plates with paintings of similar species together – and marked with arrows showing the differences – people could use his bird guide in the field to compare species quickly to make identification easier. This technique, the "Peterson Identification System", was used in most of Peterson's Field Guides from animal tracks to seashells and has been widely adopted by other publishers and authors as well.

Today, each field guide has its own range, focus and organization. Specialist publishers such as Croom Helm, along with organisations like the Audubon Society, the RSPB, the Field Studies Council, National Geographic, HarperCollins, and many others all produce quality field guides.

== Principles ==
It is somewhat difficult to generalise about how field guides are intended to be used, because this varies from one guide to another, partly depending on how expert the targeted reader is expected to be.

For general public use, the main function of a field guide is to help the reader identify a bird, plant, rock, butterfly or other natural object down to at least the popular naming level. To this end some field guides employ simple keys and other techniques: the reader is usually encouraged to scan illustrations looking for a match, and to compare similar-looking choices using information on their differences. Guides are often designed to first lead readers to the appropriate section of the book, where the choices are not so overwhelming in number.

Guides for students often introduce the concept of identification keys. Plant field guides such as Newcomb's Wildflower Guide (which is limited in scope to the wildflowers of northeastern North America) frequently have an abbreviated key that helps limit the search. Insect guides tend to limit identification to Order or Family levels rather than individual species, due to their diversity.

Many taxa show variability and it is often difficult to capture the constant features using a small number of photographs. Illustrations by artists or post processing of photographs help in emphasising specific features needed for reliable identification. Peterson introduced the idea of lines to point to these key features. This passage was written by his wife, Virginia Marie Peterson, in the preface to one of his field guides: (Note: This passage was also quoted by Law and Lynch (1988).)

A drawing can do much more than a photograph to emphasize the field marks. A photograph is a record of a fleeting instant; a drawing is a composite of the artist's experience. The artist can edit out, show field marks to best advantage, and delete unnecessary clutter. He can choose position and stress basic color and pattern unmodified by transitory light and shade. ... The artist has more options and far more control ... Whereas a photograph can have a living immediacy a good drawing is really more instructive.

Field guides aid in improving the state of knowledge of various taxa. By making the knowledge of experienced museum specialists available to amateurs, they increase the gathering of information by amateurs from a wider geographic area and increase the communication of these findings to the specialists.
