= Chester Read =

Australian rules footballer

Personal information
- Full name: Chester Allan Read
- Born: 19 February 1929; Carisbrook, Victoria
- Died: 14 April 2001 (aged 72); Geelong, Victoria
- Height: 183 cm (6 ft 0 in)
- Weight: 86 kg (190 lb)

Playing career^{1}
Years	Club	Games (Goals)
1948–50	South Melbourne	16 (4)
1953	St Kilda	1 (0)
Total		17 (4)
- ^{1} Playing statistics correct to the end of 1953.

Chester Allan Read (19 February 1929 – 14 April 2001) was an Australian rules footballer who played with South Melbourne and St Kilda in the Victorian Football League (VFL).
