= Margaret McKenny =

- Born: Margaret McKenny; April 17, 1885; Olympia, Washington, U.S.
- Died: September 4, 1969 (aged 85); Olympia, Washington, U.S.
- Occupations: Landscape architect, writer and environmentalist
- Writing career
- Genre: Nature writing
- Subjects: Landscape architecture, ecology, preservations

Margaret McKenny (April 17, 1885 - August 1969) was an American landscape architect, naturalist, activist, and writer who was referred to as the "Grand Dame" of Northwest mushrooming.

== Early life and education ==
Born in Olympia, Washington, she was a child of General Thomas I. McKenny, who served as a General in the Civil War as well as Indian Agent for Washington Territory. Her mother was Cynthia Adelaide, and she was an only child.

After attending local schools in Olympia, McKenny attended one of the few schools of landscape architecture open to women students at the turn of the century called the Lowthorpe School in Groton, Massachusetts. While attending Lowthorpe, she joined the Boston Mycological Club, creating a pathway to become a nationally-recognized mycologist.

== Career ==
After moving back to Olympia, McKenny operated a Montessori school from 1913 to 1919.

In 1919, she moved to New York City and worked for the Garden Club of America and the New York City Gardens Club as a landscape architect, among other organizations. In addition to writing for the New York Botanical Garden, she also became a staff member of the Nature Lore School at the American Museum of Natural History.

McKenny returned to Olympia in 1943. Among other jobs, she worked as official photographer for the Washington State Parks Commission.

== Activism ==
McKenny led several efforts to preserving local open spaces in Olympia from private development. Those locations include Sylvester Park in the downtown core of the city, which is included in the listing for the Olympia Downtown Historic District. Another notable success is Watershed Park, a 153 acres (62 ha) temperate rainforest in the central core of the city. McKenney founded a group called "Citizens of the Future" which circulated a petition to save the park from development, and was ultimately successful because of a trial in the Washington Supreme Court.

McKenny is also credited with being "among the first to articulate the need for the Nisqually River" delta in an era when the Port of Tacoma considered dredging the delta for a deepwater harbor and the City of Seattle considered putting a garbage dump there. In the longterm, McKenny's activism resulted in the establishment of the Billy Frank Jr. Nisqually National Wildlife Refuge.

In addition to several other organizations, McKenny is credited with founding the Olympia Audubon Society.

== Honors ==
The Olympia School District named Margaret McKenny Elementary School in her memory and the Washington State Department of Natural Resources named the Margaret McKenny Campground in Capitol State Forest for her.

The Olympia City Council named Margaret McKenny Park for her. The 4.16 acres (1.68 ha) site, located east of Watershed Park, was purchased by the city in 1999 and dedicated in her name ten years later. The park features a basketball court, looped trail, and a playground.

== Selected works ==
She is the author of several field guides, books, newspaper articles and encyclopedia entries.

- Mushrooms of Field and Wood (1929) John Day Company
- The Wild Garden (1936) Doubleday, Doran & Company, Inc.
- Your City Garden with E. L. D. Seymour (1937) D. Appleton-Century Company, Inc.
- A Book of Wild Flowers (1939) MacMillan Company
- Birds in the Garden and How to Attract Them (1939) Reynal & Hitchcock
- A Book of Garden Flowers (1940) MacMillan Company
- How the Hurricane Helped (illustrated by Winifred Bromhall, 1940) Alfred A Knopf
- Trees of the Countryside (1942) Alfred A Knopf
- Washington Nature Notes (1944) Saalfield Publishing Company later printed as Wildlife of the Pacific Northwest (1954) Kessinger Publishing
- Abe and His Girl Friend Amble (1945) Binfords & Mort
- Little White Pig (1945) Little White Pig
- A Book of Wayside Fruits (1945) MacMillan Company
- Tree Pruning Manual for the City of Olympia Tree Program with John Duffield; re-issued as the National Park Service Tree Preservation Bulletin #4 (1961)
- The Savory Wild Mushroom with Daniel E. Stuntz (1962) University of Washington Press
- A Field guide to Wildflowers of Northeastern and North-Central North America with Roger Tory Peterson (1968)

She was also an associate editor of the Wise Garden Encyclopedia in 1936 for the W. H. Wise & Company and contributed essays on "Wild Flowers" and "Growing Flowers and Vegetables" for the Childcraft encyclopedia series in 1960 for World Book Inc.
