= Roger Tory Peterson =

American naturalist, ornithologist and writer (1908–1996)

- Born: August 28, 1908; Jamestown, New York
- Died: July 28, 1996 (aged 87); Old Lyme, Connecticut
- Occupations: author, illustrator, naturalist, ornithologist
- Writing career
- Subject: Birds
- Notable works: Wild America, The Peterson Field Guides

Roger Tory Peterson (August 28, 1908 – July 28, 1996) was an American naturalist, conservationist, citizen scientist ornithologist, artist and illustrator, educator, and a founder of the 20th-century environmental movement, where he was an inspiration for many.

== Background ==
Peterson was born in Jamestown, New York, a small, industrial city in western New York, on August 28, 1908. His father, Charles Gustav Peterson, was an immigrant from Sweden who came to America as an infant. At the age of ten, Charles Peterson lost his father to appendicitis and was sent off to work in the mills. After leaving the mills, he earned his living as a traveling salesman. Roger's mother, Henrietta Badar, was an immigrant, at the age of four, of German and Polish extraction, who grew up in Rochester, New York. She went to a teachers' college, and was teaching in Elmira, New York, when she met Charles. The two married, and moved to Jamestown, where Charles took a job at a local furniture factory.

Peterson's middle name pays homage to his Uncle Tory, who resided in Oil City, Pennsylvania, located south of Jamestown. Peterson graduated from high school in 1925 and went to work in one of Jamestown's many furniture companies. During his high school years, one of his teachers, Miss Hornbeck, had encouraged his interest in sketching and painting birds and nature, while he waited to earn enough money to purchase a camera. Several months after graduating, he traveled to New York City to attend a meeting of the American Ornithologists' Union, where he met distinguished figures such as the artist Louis Agassiz Fuertes and up-and-comers like Joseph Hickey.

Soon after, he moved to New York City and earned money by painting furniture, so that he could attend classes at the Art Students League in 1927–1929 and later at the National Academy of Design. He also managed to gain entrance to the eventually famous Bronx County Bird Club, though not himself from the Bronx. He hoped to attend Cornell University, but his family's finances were not sufficient for the cost of tuition. Instead, he managed to obtain a position as an art instructor at the Rivers School in Brookline, Massachusetts. In 1934, his A Field Guide to the Birds was published. The initial run of 2,000 copies sold out within a week.

Peterson was married three times: briefly, to Mildred Washington, for 33 years to Barbara Coulter, with whom he had two sons, and for 20 years to Virginia Westervelt. His second and third wives contributed to the research and organization of his guides. Virginia Marie Peterson developed the species range maps that were introduced in the fifth edition of A Field Guide to the Birds of Eastern and Central North America.

== Career ==
Peterson's first work on birds was an article titled "Notes from Field and Study" published in the magazine Bird-Lore. In this piece, he recorded two anecdotal sight records from 1925: a Carolina wren and a titmouse.

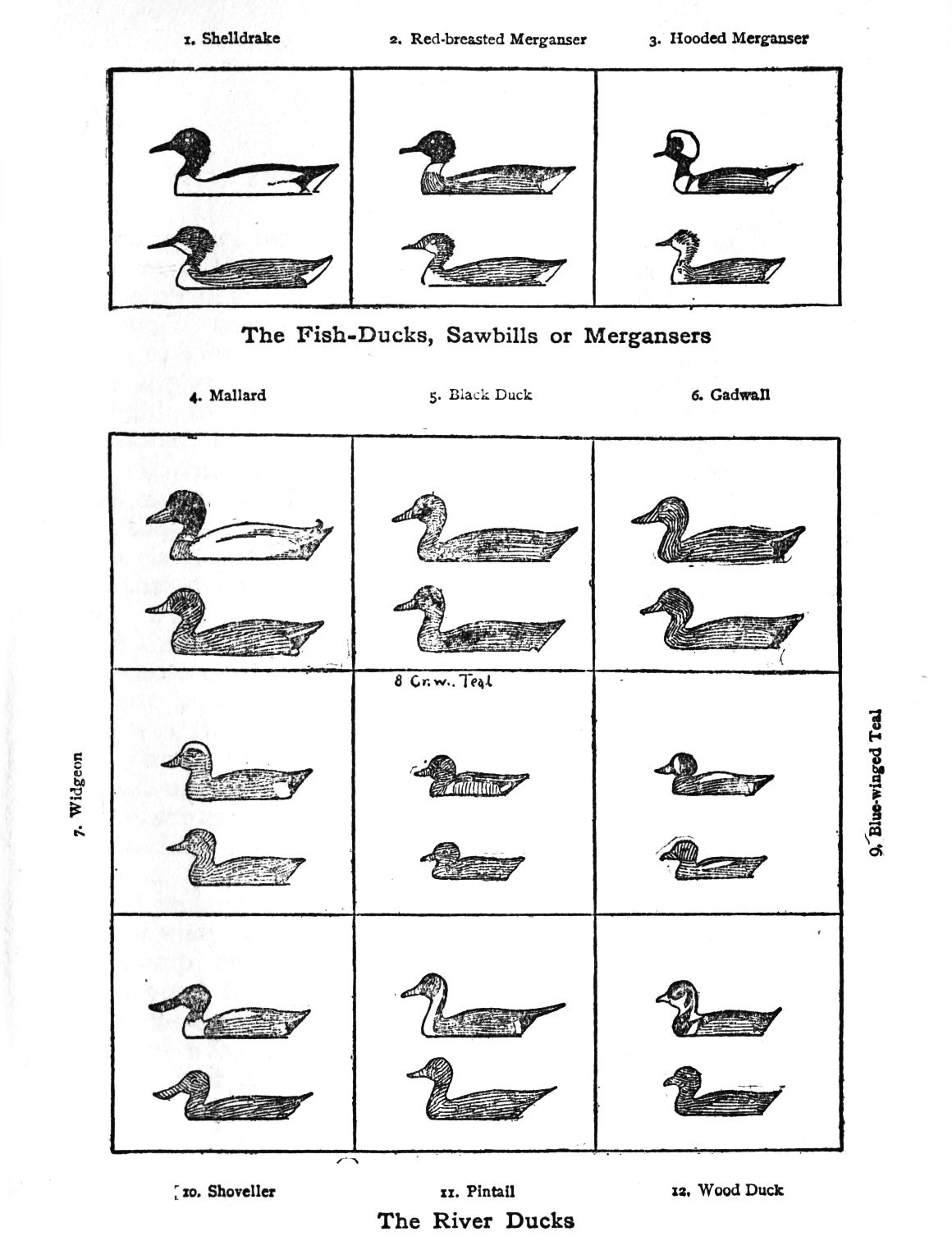
Inspiration from E. T. Seton's diagram of ducks (1903)

In 1934 he published the first edition of his popular Guide to the Birds, considered by some to be the first modern field guide. The first printing of 2‚000 copies sold out in one week and the book subsequently went through six editions. One of the inspirations for his field guide was a diagram of ducks, created by Ernest Thompson Seton in his book Two Little Savages (1903).

Peterson co-wrote Wild America with James Fisher, and edited or wrote many of the volumes in the Peterson Field Guide series. His contributions span a wide array of topics, from rocks and minerals to beetles and reptiles. He developed the Peterson Identification System and is known for the clarity of both his illustrations of field guides and his delineation of relevant field marks.

Paul R. Ehrlich, in The Birder's Handbook: A Field Guide to the Natural History of North American Birds (Ehrlich et al. 1988), said of Peterson:

In this century, no one has done more to promote an interest in living creatures than Roger Tory Peterson, the inventor of the modern field guide.

Over the course of his lifetime, Peterson received many accolades, including the United States' Presidential Medal of Freedom. He was honored by the two Swedish District lodges of the Vasa Order of America, who selected him to be Swedish-American of the Year. He was twice nominated for the Nobel Peace Prize and received 23 honorary doctorates.

Peterson died in 1996 at his home in Old Lyme, Connecticut. His remains were cremated, and his ashes were spread on and around Great Island near Old Lyme, under grave memorials in the Duck River Cemetery in Old Lyme, and in the Pine Hill Cemetery in Falconer, New York.

== Legacy, including the Roger Tory Peterson Institute of Natural History ==
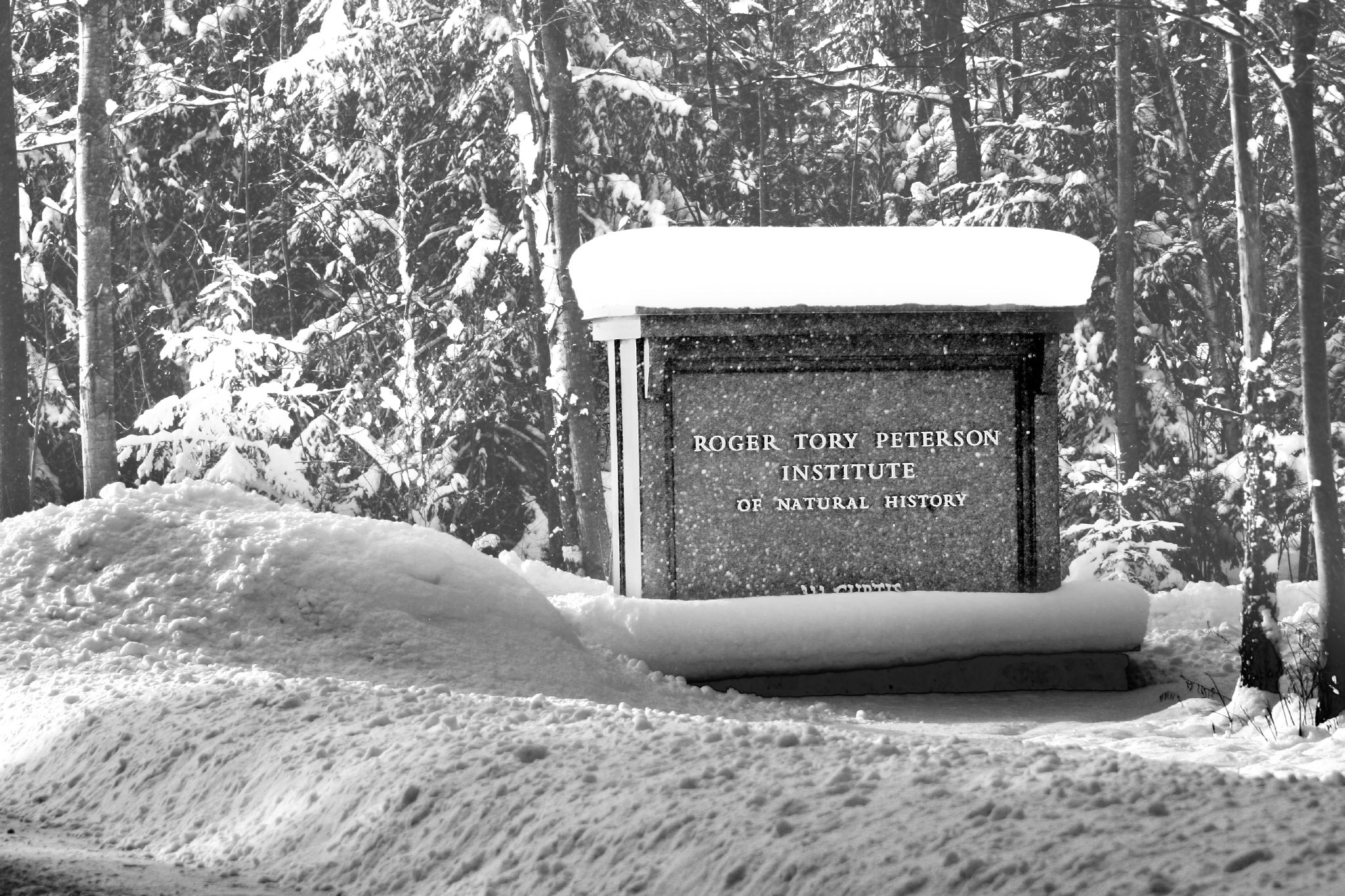
Roger Tory Peterson Institute sign

The Roger Tory Peterson Institute (RTPI) of Natural History in Jamestown, New York, launched in 1984, and ramped up its activity in 1986 with its hire of the first president, Dr. Harold D. Mahan. At that time, the institute's primary mission was described as being "to develop programs to increase the number of serious students of natural history". The institute's official ribbon-cutting and dedication took place in 1993. The RTPI houses the largest collection of Peterson's work. Its present mission and vision is stated as being to challenge visitors "to confront environmental issues of regional, national and global concern" and to be "a living embodiment of the Peterson Field Guide".

In 1997, the Harvard Museum of Natural History established the Roger Tory Peterson Medal "to keep alive the memory of the pioneering naturalist and author of the legendary Peterson Field Guide to Birds.” In 2000, the American Birding Association established the Roger Tory Peterson Award for Promoting the Cause of Birding.

Three biographies about Peterson have been written. The first, a 1977 authorized biography by John Devlin and Grace Naismith, received mixed reviews. Two new biographies were published around the centenary of Peterson's birth. Douglas Carlson's Roger Tory Peterson: A Biography and Elizabeth Rosenthal's Birdwatcher: The Life of Roger Tory Peterson (2008) were reviewed by Todd Engstrom in the journal of the American Ornithological Society, The Auk. In 2020, Peterson's step-daughter from his third marriage, Linda Marie Westervelt, self-published Where Bluebirds Fly, a biographical memoir about the twenty-year relationship between her mother, Virginia Marie Peterson and step-father.

== Honors and awards ==
- the Netherlands' Order of the Golden Ark
- 1995 Union Medal of the British Ornithological Union
- 1986 Linnaean Society of New York's Eisenmann Medal
- 1980 U.S. Presidential Medal of Freedom
- 1980 the Ludlow Griscom Award for Outstanding Contributions in Regional Ornithology from the American Birding Association
- 1976 the Linné Gold Medal from the Royal Swedish Academy of Sciences
- 1972 the World Wildlife Fund Gold Medal
- 1970 the Frances K. Hutchinson Medal from the Garden Club of America
- 1961 the New York Zoological Society Gold Medal
- 1944 Brewster Medal of the American Ornithologists’ Union

== Publications ==
- A Field Guide to the Birds of Eastern and Central North America (Houghton Mifflin‚ fifth edition. 2002, earlier editions 1934‚ 1939‚ 1941‚ 1947‚ 1980‚ 1994)
- The Field Guide Art of Roger Tory Peterson (Easton Press, 1990. 2 volumes)
- Save the Birds with Antony W. Diamond‚ Rudolf L. Schreiber‚ Walter Cronkite (Houghton Mifflin‚ 1987)
- Peterson First Guide to Wildflowers of Northeastern and North-central North America (Houghton Mifflin‚ 1986)
- Peterson First Guide to Birds of North America (Houghton Mifflin‚ 1986)
- The Audubon Society Baby Elephant Folio with Virginia Peterson (Abbeville Press‚ 1981)
- Penguins (Houghton Mifflin‚ 1979)
- Birds of America (National Audubon Society‚ 1978)
- A Field Guide to Mexican Birds with Edward Chalif (Houghton Mifflin, 1973, Spanish translation‚ Editorial Diana‚ 1989)
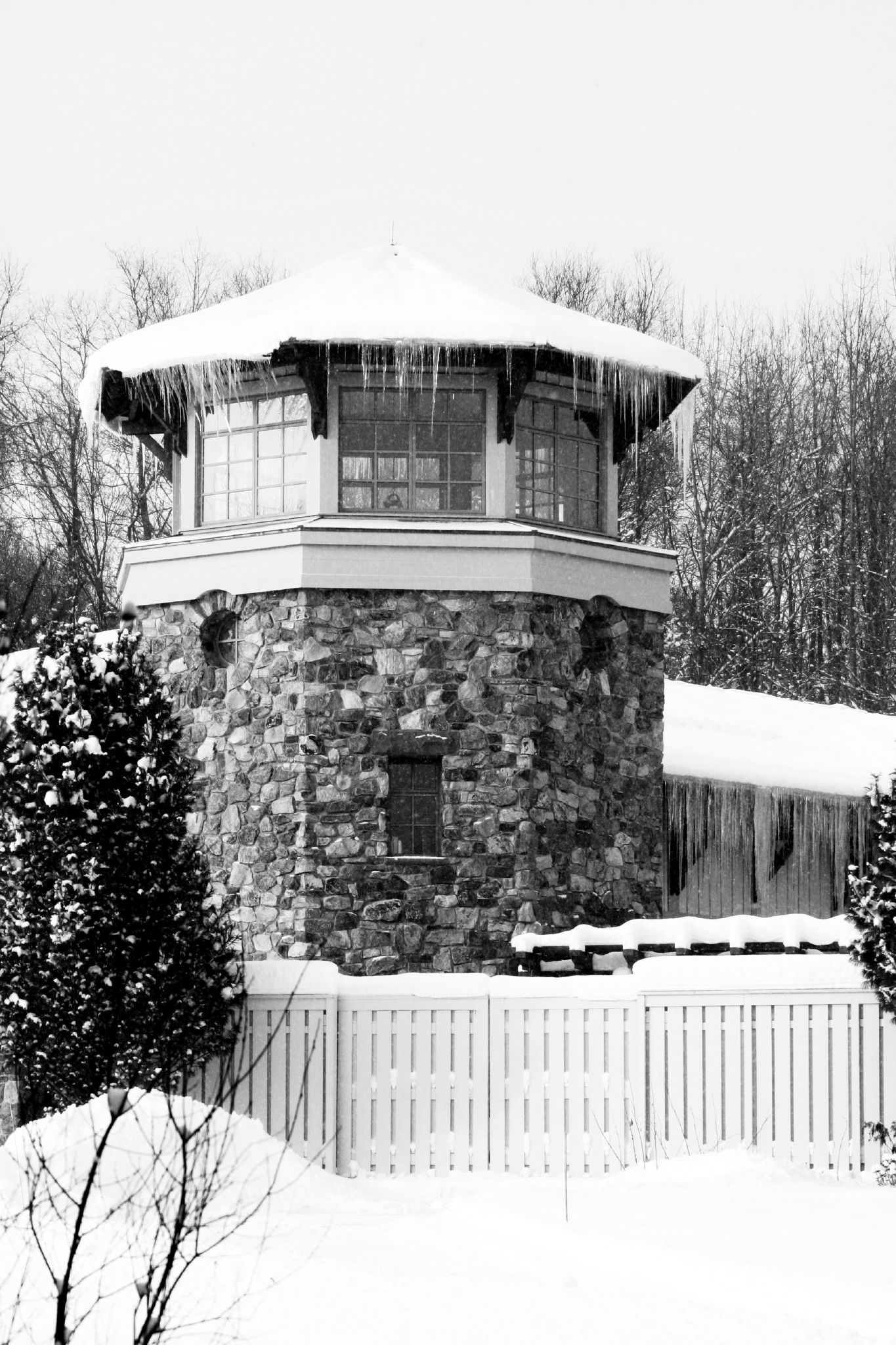
  Roger Tory Peterson Institute.
- A Field Guide to Wildflowers of Northeastern and North-central North America (with Margaret McKenny). (Houghton Mifflin‚ 1968)
- The World of Birds with James Fisher (Doubleday‚ 1964)
- A Field Guide to the Birds of Texas and Adjacent States (Houghton Mifflin‚ 1960, revised 1963)
- A Bird-Watcher's Anthology (Harcourt Brace‚ 1957)
- Wild America with James Fisher (Houghton Mifflin, 1955)
- A Field Guide to the Birds of Britain and Europe with Guy Mountfort, and P.A.D. Hollom (William Collins, 1954)
  - 1965 edition: revised and enlarged in collaboration with I.J. Ferguson-Lees and D.I.M. Wallace
  - 1971 impression: ISBN 0-00-212020-8
  - 2004 edition: ISBN 978-0-00-719234-2
- Wildlife in Color (Houghton Mifflin‚ 1951)
- How to Know the Birds (Houghton Mifflin‚ 1949)
- Birds Over America (Dodd, Mead and Company‚ 1948, revised 1964)
- A Field Guide to Western Birds (Houghton Mifflin‚ 1941, revised 1961‚ 1990)
- The Audubon Guide to Attracting Birds with John H. Baker (National Audubon Society‚ 1941)

== Other sources ==
- Carlson, Douglas. Roger Tory Peterson: A Biography (The University of Texas Press. 2007) ISBN 978-0-292-71680-3.
- Devlin, John C. and Grace Naismith. The World of Roger Tory Peterson – An Authorized Biography. (New York Times Books. 1977) ISBN 0-8129-0694-2
- Ehrlich, Paul R., David S. Dobkin and Darryl Wheye. The Birder's Handbook: A Field Guide to the Natural History of North American Birds (Fireside. 1988) ISBN 0-671-65989-8.
- Johnson, J. (2008). "Naturalist and Legend: Roger Tory Peterson". New York State Conservationist. 63 (August): 2–7. ISSN 0010-650X.
- Mountfort, G. (1996). "Obituary: Roger Tory Peterson (1908–1996)". British Birds. 89: 544–545. ISSN 0007-0335.
- Rosenthal, Elizabeth J. Birdwatcher: the Life of Roger Tory Peterson (The Lyons Press. 2008) ISBN 978-1-59921-294-4.
