= Chester Albert Reed =

American ornithologist (1876–1912)

Chester Albert Reed (January 10, 1876 – December 16, 1912) was an American ornithologist who produced one of the first field guides for American birds. He wrote several other books in the field guide format including one for wild flowers.

== Biography ==
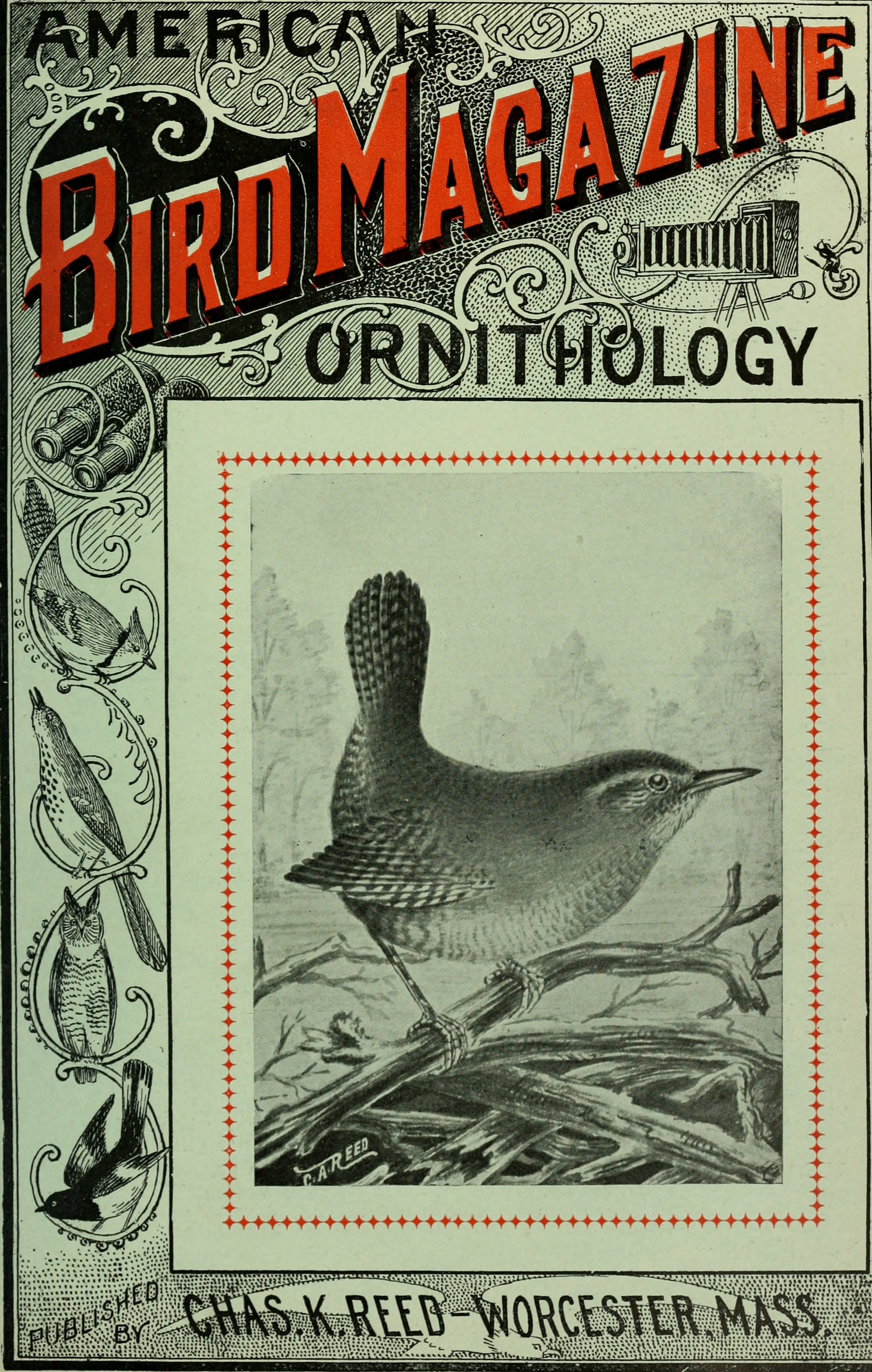
Cover of Bird Magazine (1901)

Reed was born in Worcester, Massachusetts, the second child of taxidermy business owner Charles Keller (1851–1921) and Carrie Reed. He became interested in nature at a young age and studied taxidermy while working at his father's taxidermy store. He attended public school and went to the Worcester High School. He then studied engineering at the Worcester Polytechnic Institute and graduated with a diploma in electrical engineering in 1896. Tall (5 foot, 9 inches) and heavy built (140 pounds), he was a football player at school. He also pursued his artistic talents. The yearbook for his graduation years was produced by him and included his illustrations. He received a camera from his father upon graduation. He did not follow engineering as a profession and instead moved to illustration and taxidermy, contributing to book design and magazine illustration for his father. In 1897 he contributed to an aquarium guide produced by his father.

In June 1900, he married Eva Mellisa Himes and they had a daughter Mertice Elaine (1902-1974). In 1910 he published a book on Wild flowers east of the Rockies, dedicated to his daughter. In 1901 he had founded a magazine called American Ornithology for the Home and School which went on until 1906 and in it he wrote a variety of pieces on ornithology and nature, with his photographs and illustrations, nearly 1500 pages in all. In 1902, along with his father, and with encouragement from Frank M. Chapman, he published a Color Key to North American Birds. In 1911 he wrote Camera Studies of Wild Birds in their Homes which inspired many into bird photography.

Reed gave talks to students from 1904 to 1909 at the Worcester Natural History Society. Some sessions had as many as 700 boys and girls. His collections of taxidermied specimens, nearly 468 representing 236 species were acquired for $1500 by Mrs Eliza D. Dodge in 1907 for the Worcester Natural History Society. In 1908 he became the "state ornithologist" succeeding Edward Howe Forbush and was also curator of the museum.

Reed died prematurely from pneumonia, at the age of thirty six.
