= Stebbins =

Stebbins may refer to:

== People with the surname ==
- Alice Stebbins Wells (1873–1957), first female American police officer
- Catharine A. F. Stebbins (1823–1904), American abolitionist and suffragist
- Charles Stebbins (1789–1873), American politician
- Cyril A. Stebbins (1880–1953), American agricultural educator
- Emma Stebbins (1815–1882), American sculptor
- Fannie Stebbins (1858–1949), American science teacher and naturalist
- G. Ledyard Stebbins (1906–2000), American botanist and geneticist
- Gabrielle Stebbins, American politician from Vermont
- Genevieve Stebbins (1857–1934), American author, teacher, performer
- Harrison Stebbins (1820–1882), American politician
- Henry G. Stebbins (1811–1881), American politician and president of the New York Stock Exchange
- Joel Stebbins (1878–1966), American astronomer
- Lucy Ward Stebbins (c. 1880–1955), Dean of Women at University of California, Berkeley
- Michael Stebbins (born 1971), American geneticist and science writer
- Nathaniel Livermore Stebbins (1847–1922), American marine photographer
- Raymond Stebbins, American attorney and political activist
- Richard Stebbins (born 1945), American athlete
- Robert C. Stebbins (1915–2013), American herpetologist and illustrator
- Steele Stebbins (born 2003), American film and TV actor
- Theodore Stebbins (born 1938), American art historian, curator and academic
- De Wayne Stebbins (1835–1901), American politician from Wisconsin

=== Fictional characters ===
- Purley Stebbins, American police sergeant in the Nero Wolfe series
- Stebbins, character in The Long Walk

== Places ==
United States

- Stebbins, Alaska, a town
- Stebbins Corners, a location in Sherman (town), New York
- Stebbinsville, Wisconsin, an unincorporated community
- Stebbins High School, Ohio
- Stebbins Hall, a residential hall, University of California, Berkeley campus, California

== Other uses ==
- Si Stebbins, a card stack system used in magic (published by William Coffrin, AKA Si Stebbins)
- 2300 Stebbins, an asteroid
- Stebbins (crater), a lunar crater named for Joel Stebbins
- A Field Guide to Western Reptiles and Amphibians, commonly known as Stebbins after its author Robert C. Stebbins
