= Grinnell (surname) =

Grinnell is a surname, originally of locational or topographical origin.

Notable people with the surname include:

- Claudia Grinnell, British organist and choir director
- Claudia Kreuzig Grinnell, German expatriate, English professor and poet
- Frederick Grinnell (1836–1905), American engineer
- Frederick Grinnell (biologist) (born 1945), American biologist
- George Bird Grinnell, (1849–1938), American anthropologist, historian, naturalist, and writer
- George Blake Grinnell (1823–1891), American merchant and financier
- Henry Grinnell (1799–1874), American merchant, financier of Arctic explorations
- Henry Walton Grinnell (1843–1920), American admiral, son of Henry Grinnell
- Joseph Grinnell (1877–1939), American zoologist
- Josiah Bushnell Grinnell (1821–1891), U.S. congressman
- Katherine Van Allen Grinnell (1839-1917), American lecturer, author, reformer
- Moses H. Grinnell (1803–1877), U.S. Navy officer and U.S. Representative from New York
- William Morton Grinnell (1857–1906), U.S. diplomat & banker
- Elizabeth Grinnell (1851–1935), American writer, clubwoman, and naturalist
