= Alden H. Miller =

American ornithologist (1906–1965)

- Miller with a collection of bird specimens
- Born: February 4, 1906; Los Angeles, California
- Died: October 9, 1965 (aged 59); Clear Lake, California
- Education: UCLA; UC Berkeley
- Awards: Brewster Medal (1943); Guggenheim Fellowship (1957)
- Scientific career
- Fields: Ornithology
- Workplaces: Museum of Vertebrate Zoology; University of California, Berkeley
- Doctoral advisor: Joseph Grinnell
- Doctoral students: A. Starker Leopold; Charles G. Sibley; Richard C. Banks

Alden Holmes Miller (February 4, 1906 – October 9, 1965) was an American ornithologist and director of the Museum of Vertebrate Zoology at the University of California, Berkeley for 25 years. He published over 250 papers on the biology, distribution, and taxonomy of birds, and served as president of the American Ornithologists' Union (1953-1955) and the International Commission on Zoological Nomenclature (1964-1965), and as editor of The Condor from 1939 until his death. He was a member of the National Academy of Sciences.

Alden Miller was born February 4, 1906, in Los Angeles, California, the son of Loye H. Miller, a noted professor and researcher. He attended the University of California, Los Angeles, earning a B.A. in 1927, then enrolled in UC Berkeley, receiving an M.S. in Biology in 1928 and his PhD in Biology in 1930 under Joseph Grinnell. Ten years later he succeeded Grinnell as the director of the Museum of Vertebrate Zoology. He is noted for his studies of Lanius (the largest genus of shrikes) and juncos (sparrow-like birds). He received the Brewster Medal for his contributions to ornithology. Miller's approach to collections-based research employed "concepts, theories, practices, tools, and technologies from the laboratory, museum, and field."

Miller supervised around 30 doctoral students and 15 master's students, (Note: Sources differ in the number of Miller's graduate students: Eakin et al. write that 31 Ph.D. and 15 M.A. theses were written under Miller's direction, while Frank Pitelka, a student of Miller's, in a 1993 review states Miller sponsored 28 PhD students, including 26 in ornithology.) many of whom became notable ornithologists in their own right. His doctoral students included Charles G. Sibley, who co-developed the Sibley–Ahlquist taxonomy of birds; author and conservationist A. Starker Leopold; and Richard C. Banks, founder of the Ornithological Council.

Miller died of a heart attack at Clear Lake, California, on October 9, 1965, at the age of 59.

== Books ==
- The Distribution of the Birds of California. Berkeley: Cooper Ornithological Club. 1947. (With Joseph Grinnell)
- The Lives of Desert Animals in Joshua Tree National Monument. University of California Press. 1964. (With Robert C. Stebbins)
