= Robert C. Stebbins =

American herpetologist

- Stebbins in his studio, 2004
- Born: March 31, 1915; Chico, California, U.S.
- Died: September 23, 2013 (aged 98); Eugene, Oregon, U.S.
- Education: University of California, Los Angeles
- Known for: Field guides; Discovering ring species in Ensatina salamanders; Desert conservation
- Scientific career
- Fields: Herpetology
- Workplaces: UC Berkeley; Museum of Vertebrate Zoology
- Thesis: Ecology of the iguanid genus Uma. (1943)
- Doctoral advisor: Raymond B. Cowles

Robert Cyril Stebbins (March 31, 1915 – September 23, 2013) was an American herpetologist and illustrator known for his field guides and popular books as well as his studies of reptiles and amphibians. His Field Guide to Western Reptiles and Amphibians, first published in 1966, is still considered the definitive reference of its kind, owing to both the quality of the illustrations and the comprehensiveness of the text. A professor of zoology at the University of California, Berkeley, for over 30 years, he was the first curator of herpetology at the Museum of Vertebrate Zoology, a 1949 Guggenheim fellow, and author of over 70 scientific articles. His discovery of the ring species phenomenon in Ensatina salamanders is now a textbook example of speciation, and he performed extensive research on the parietal eye of reptiles. He produced nature films, supported science education in primary grades, and organized conservation efforts that aided in the passing of the 1994 California Desert Protection Act. After retirement he continued to paint, collect field notes, and write books. Stebbins is commemorated in the scientific names of three species: Batrachoseps stebbinsi, the Tehachapi slender salamander; Anniella stebbinsi, a legless lizard; and Ambystoma tigrinum stebbinsi, the endangered Sonora tiger salamander.

== Early life ==
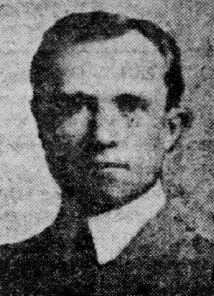
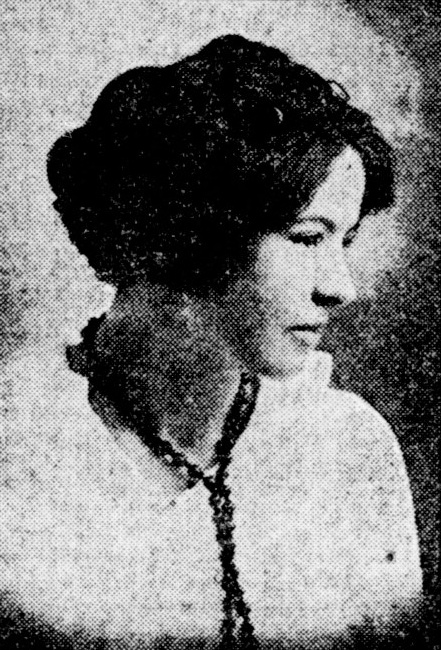
Stebbins' parents Cyril and Louise inspired his interests in nature and art.

Robert Stebbins was born on March 31, 1915, in Chico, California, to parents Cyril Adelbert and Louise Stebbins (née Beck). His father, born in Wisconsin of English descent, was an instructor at Chico State Normal School who had also published on birds and agriculture, stressing the importance of gardening in education. The oldest of seven children, young Robert grew up learning about local birds and exploring the wildlife of Northern California. His mother, born in Switzerland and educated at the Normal School, instilled a sense of artistry in Robert, painting pictures for Robert and his siblings in her spare time. When Stebbins was seven, his family moved to the San Francisco Bay Area, where his father worked on agricultural curriculum for children and taught at the University of California, Berkeley. Around the age of nine, his family moved to Southern California, living first in Pomona, then in Sherman Oaks, Los Angeles. Stebbins spent time hiking in the nearby Santa Monica Mountains, exploring the wildlife and amassing a collection of bird and mammal specimens which he prepared and mounted himself. Stebbins attended North Hollywood High School, where his father taught hygiene and agriculture. Robert graduated in 1933. He discovered his artistic talents around sixteen years old. His early work consisted of cartoons: he drew illustrations on classmates' clothing and contributed cartoons to youth magazines, winning several awards.

== University and early career (1933–1945) ==
Shortly after graduating high school, Stebbins enrolled in the University of California, Los Angeles (UCLA). He initially majored in civil engineering, thinking it a better career option than biology, but became unhappy with the program. Struggling with poor performance and health issues related to congenital heart problems, he took a leave for year and a half. During his time in recuperation, he turned his attention back to natural history, and was persuaded to return to UCLA by Raymond Cowles, a biology professor there. Stebbins returned with enthusiasm despite the perceived lack of job security, remarking in 1985: "I was cautious because of the Great Depression, but I was determined to pursue biology even if it meant standing on a corner with a tin cup." He switched his major to zoology and graduated in 1940 with highest honors.

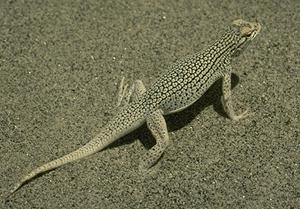
A Coachella Valley fringe-toed lizard, subject of much of Stebbins' graduate research

After graduating, Stebbins split his time between a summer job as a naturalist at Lassen Volcanic National Park and pursuing graduate school at UCLA. Over the next few years he also obtained teaching credentials in junior college, high school, and elementary education. Stebbins initially planned to study birds, with an eye towards roadrunners, but felt the field of ornithology was too crowded, while herpetology, the study of reptiles and amphibians, offered more opportunities for new research. Cowles became his graduate advisor. The main focus of Stebbins' graduate research was the biology of fringe-toed lizards, a group of sand-dwelling lizards of the American Southwest. For his master's degree (completed in 1942) he studied the anatomical structure of the nasal passages of the lizards, documenting in detail the looped, horseshoe-shaped structure of the nasal passages that functions as a u-trap, preventing sand grains from being inhaled while the lizards lay buried at the sand's surface. His Ph.D dissertation (completed in 1943) further explored the anatomical, behavioral, and physiological adaptations of the lizards. During this time he also published on the behavior of the sidewinder rattlesnake, and, with his father, produced two field guides to birds, providing illustrations to his father's text. Their first book, What Bird is That?, was pressed in the family garage. Stebbins considered his father "a pioneer of sorts in the extensive use of drawings in teaching natural history," a tradition he later strove to continue in his own works.

On June 8, 1941, Stebbins married Anna-rose Cooper, who would eventually type the text of all of Stebbins' field guides. Part of their honeymoon was spent camping in the Owens Valley of southeastern California.

== Career (1945–1978) ==
In 1945 Stebbins was hired an assistant professor of zoology at the University of California, Berkeley, and became the first curator of herpetology at the Museum of Vertebrate Zoology, where he would remain throughout his career. The first faculty member to teach herpetology at Berkeley, he wrote new lab manuals, created the herpetology teaching collection, and co-taught a popular course on vertebrate natural history.

=== Ring species in salamanders ===
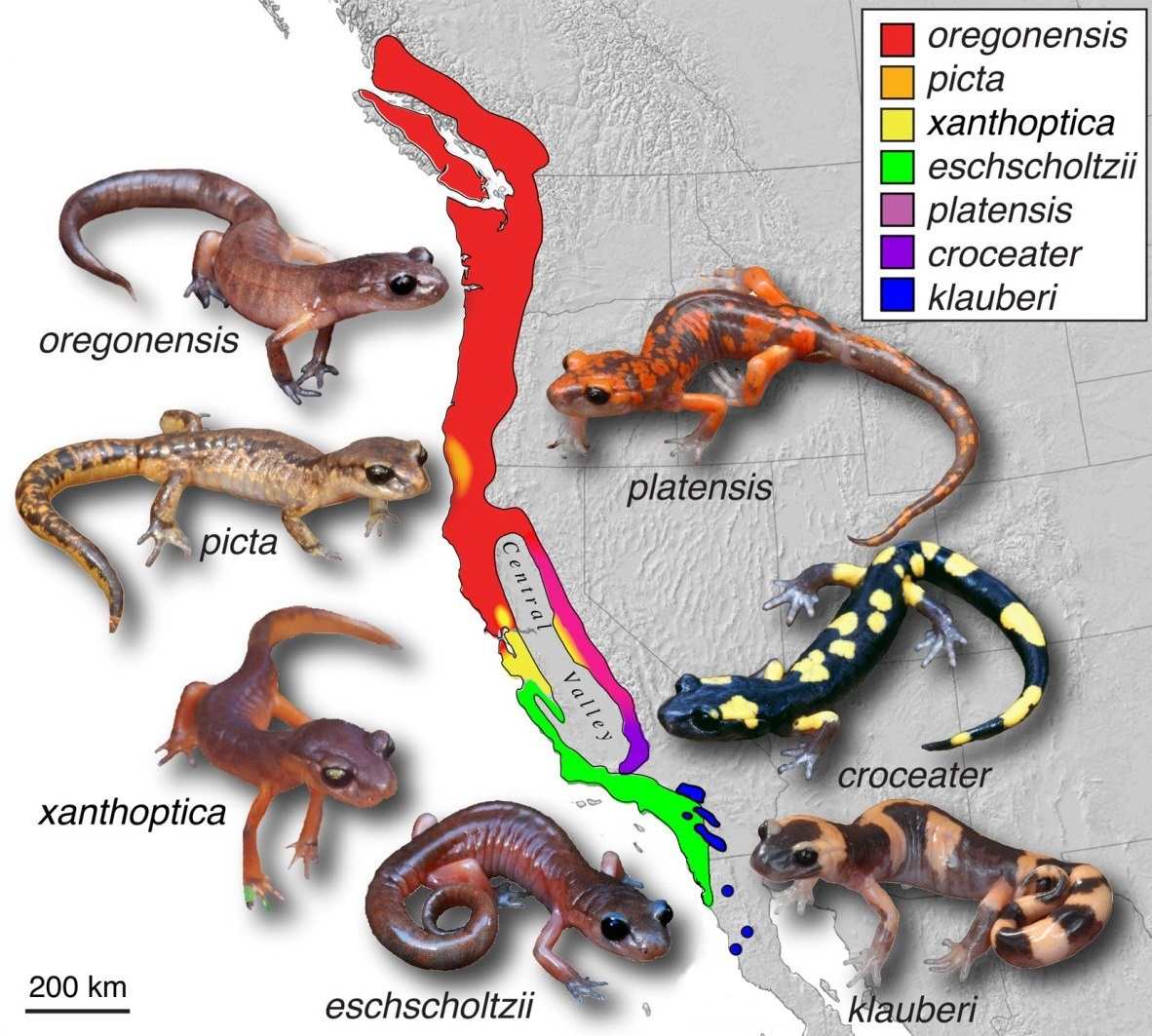
The various forms of Ensatina constitute a ring around the Central Valley: adjacent forms interbreed throughout the ring except at the southern end, where two forms behave as separate species.

Stebbins soon became interested in Ensatina salamanders, which occur from British Columbia to Baja California and are present in both the Sierra Nevada and Coast Ranges of California but absent in the Central Valley. Finding the salamanders in Berkeley very different from the ones he was used to seeing in the mountains of Southern California, he embarked upon a research program examining color differences throughout California. In his resulting monograph, published in 1949, he proposed that the color varieties—many previously regarded as distinct species—were actually various races or subspecies of a single species that in most locations interbreed where two forms co-occur, creating hybrids that partially resemble both forms. However, at the southern edge of the Central Valley, where the Sierra foothill populations come into contact with those of the Coast Range, the populations do not interbreed, instead acting as distinct species. This phenomenon is known as a ring speciation, with different populations representing different stages of speciation, the process by which one species becomes two. Zoologist Arnold Grobman called Stebbins' research "without doubt, the most outstanding study of a genus of American salamanders that has yet appeared." The Ensatina complex has been the focus of research ever since, and is a widely used textbook example of evolutionary processes.

=== Reptilian parietal eye ===
Stebbins' early work with lizards in the southern California desert led to a series of papers from the 1950s through the 1970s exploring the parietal eye of reptiles (also called the "third eye", a tiny light-sensitive organ on the forehead) and the associated pineal gland, both of which are now known to influence circadian rhythms. Aided by a Senior Postdoctoral Fellowship from the National Science Foundation, Stebbins and colleagues found that lizards with the parietal eye surgically removed changed their behavior: they became active much earlier in the day, spent more time in the sun, and remained active much later than control lizards. Further studies over the next few decades focused on the parietal eye of the tuatara, the pineal gland's effects on lizard reproductive behavior, and parietal skull openings in fossil "mammal-like reptiles" such as Lystrosaurus. His work had implications beyond reptile biology: Nobel laureate Julius Axelrod, after reading the work of Stebbins and others, began investigating the pineal gland in mammals, with emphasis on the effect of melatonin on activity cycles. Melatonin has since been found to influence human health. Stebbins was proud of his parietal and pineal work, calling it "possibly the single piece of research which gives me the most satisfaction."

=== Other research, conservation, and field guides ===
In 1949 Stebbins received a Guggenheim Fellowship that allowed him to extend his studies throughout the western United States and to collect enough material to begin preparing his first amphibian field manuals. The first of these to appear was Amphibians of Western North America (1951, University of California Press), covering the U.S. and Canada roughly west of the 102nd meridian. Praised for its thoroughness as well as its illustrations, the book "unquestionably provides more information concerning the 51 species ... covered than any preceding it," wrote Charles M. Bogert: "The maps provided for each species and subspecies are on the whole the most detailed and accurate of any thus far published." Stebbins' second herpetological field guide, Amphibians and Reptiles of Western North America (1954, McGraw-Hill), was similarly praised.

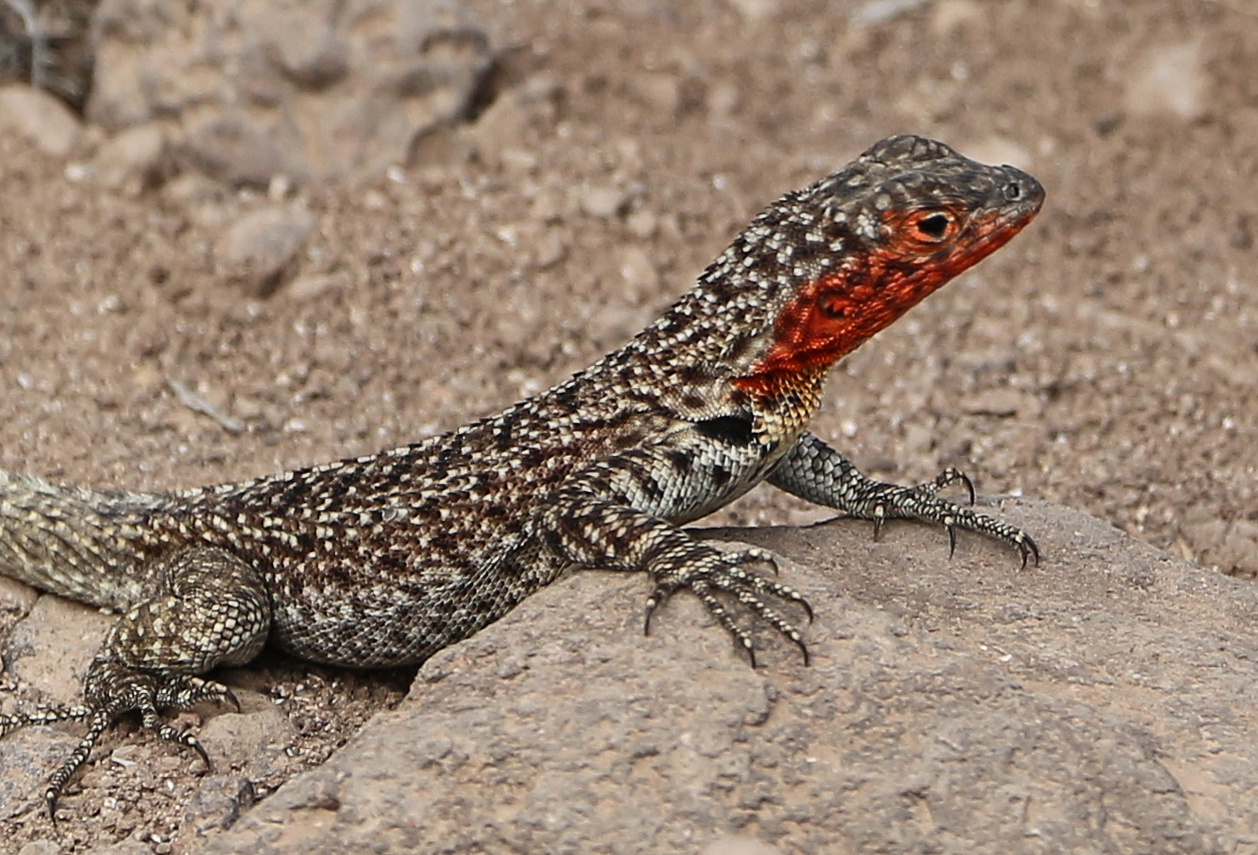
Stebbins studied thyroid and pineal function in Galápagos lava lizards

In 1964 Stebbins visited the Galápagos Islands on a research expedition and studied the ecology and behavior of marine iguanas and lava lizards. Also on the expedition was Roger Tory Peterson, who recalled "While the rest of were enjoying high adventure on the more remote islands and sea-girt rocks, he patiently snared 200 frisky lizards with a noose of thread suspended from a rod. He took their cloacal temperatures, marked them with dye, and then dosed them with radioactive iodine, which enabled him to locate the elusive reptiles later with a Geiger counter." In 1966, Stebbins produced what became his best-known book, A Field Guide to Western Reptiles and Amphibians (Peterson Field Guides), which Peterson called "a classic ... one of the most beautiful as well as scholarly works in the series".

Video: Robert Stebbins on Science in Action
- "Nature: Camouflage Expert"; 1953 (25:02)
- "Friendly Snakes"; 1954 (25:56)

Stebbins was also committed to education and conservation. He made appearances on the TV series Science in Action, traveled to Asia to promote science education, and chaired a U.C. elementary school science project which recommended that science be taught to children as early as six. In conjunction with the Sierra Club he produced two educational films: Nature Next Door (1962) and No Room for Wilderness? (1967). Stebbins co-authored revisions of the widely used textbooks General Zoology (5th ed.,1972; 6th ed., 1979) and Elements of Zoology (4th ed., 1974), books originally written by Tracy Storer and Robert Usinger.

Someday Robert Stebbins may be remembered as the man most responsible for saving what was left of the California desert.

— Richard Louv, The Web of Life

In the late 1960s Stebbins became concerned about the impacts that increasingly popular off-road vehicle (ORV) driving was having on desert ecosystems of southern California—witnessing environmental degradation in some of the same places he had studied during graduate school—and became actively involved in over a decade of conservation efforts. Stebbins and colleagues studied the diversity of organisms in and around ORV areas, communicated research to Bureau of Land Management officials, and petitioned President Jimmy Carter to limit all-terrain vehicle use in deserts. Stebbins faced opposition from ORV riders and their lobbyists: American Motorcyclist magazine called him a "staunch abolitionist in the war against motorized vehicles in the desert." Stebbins' efforts eventually helped secure the passing of the California Desert Protection Act of 1994 which established the Mojave National Preserve and elevated Joshua Tree and Death Valley from national monuments to more protected national parks. In 1998 Stebbins was recognized in the U.S. Congress by Representative George Miller and the Contra Costa Times as one of 10 environmental leaders deemed "national treasures" for their activism.

Other research included field work in Colombia, South Africa, and Australia, and the description of several species: the Jemez Mountains salamander, southern torrent salamander, yellow-eyed ensatina, and the panamint alligator lizard. Two salamanders were named in his honor during his time at Berkeley: the Tehachapi slender salamander (Batrachoseps stebbinsi) and the Sonora tiger salamander (Ambystoma tigrinum stebbinsi). Over his 32 years at Berkeley, Stebbins was the advisor to 29 graduate students, including Wade Fox, Richard G. Zweifel, and R. Bruce Bury. Upon his retirement from UC Berkeley in 1978, Stebbins was awarded the highest faculty honor, the Berkeley Citation.

== Retirement years (1978–2013) ==
After retiring, Stebbins remained active in painting, conservation, and education, and continued to make natural history observations. He revised his well-known and widely used Field Guide in 1985 and again in 2003. He co-wrote the non-specialist book A Natural History of Amphibians with former student Nathan Cohen in 1997, and revised his Field Guide to California Amphibians and Reptiles in 2012, with new contributions by Samuel McGinnis, another former student. In 2009 he produced Connecting With Nature: A Naturalist's Perspective, a book intended to help connect children with nature. He took additional art lessons, broadened his subject matter to include landscapes, African wildlife, portraits, and still lifes, and took up the violin, which he had studied decades earlier. His paintings have been shown and sold in galleries and museums in Berkeley, Palm Springs, and Oregon.

Stebbins was a fellow of the California Academy of Sciences, which awarded him its highest honor, the Fellows Medal, in 1991.

Stebbins died at age 98 at his home in Eugene, Oregon on September 23, 2013, having been in declining health over the previous year. He was survived by his wife and three children. Only one week before his death, he was honored in the scientific name of a newly described species of legless lizard, Anniella stebbinsi. His collected field notes, comprising over 35 bound volumes, are archived in the Museum of Vertebrate Zoology.

== The "Stebbins" ==
Cover of first edition

Stebbins' book A Field Guide to Western Reptiles and Amphibians, first published in 1966 and revised in 1985, 2003, and 2018, has widely been considered "the bible of the field" for American herpetologists. Often referred to simply as "Stebbins", the book has educated and inspired generations of naturalists and herpetologists. On the impact of the guide, professor Samuel Sweet of UC Santa Barbara stated "Before that book, if people went out to look for snakes, it was so they could gather them up to sell to pet shops or just show off to their buddies. What [Stebbins] did was help make a transition to a similar situation as bird watching, where it became OK to just look at the animals and leave them alone." In 2017 the book was ranked #7 in BookFinder.com's "out-of-print and in demand", a list of the most searched for out-of-print titles.

In 1966, the Houghton-Mifflin Company first published A Field Guide to Western Reptiles and Amphibians as part of its Peterson Field Guide series. While including some illustrations from Stebbins' previous books, the high quality of the artwork was immediately recognized, as was the quality and thoroughness of the writing. Biologist David B. Wake, then of the University of Chicago but later to work with Stebbins at Berkeley, considered the only "serious defect" to be absence of any coverage of snake-bite first aid. Wake also noted that the geographic area covered left a gap ranging from 75 miles to over 400 miles wide when paired with the earlier Peterson Guide to eastern reptiles and amphibians by Roger Conant.

The second edition, published in 1985, included several changes such as 37 new species, 12 new plates of illustrations, the inclusion of endemic species of the Baja California peninsula, and new common names chosen to enhance clarity. In his 1986 review, Sweet remarked on the frankness of imperfect knowledge: "For the first time we have a field guide that indicates clearly which taxonomic interpretations are tentative and where distributions and life history features remain poorly known." Concerned about the impact of over-collecting, Stebbins reduced coverage of collecting and keeping animals, and also removed a section on handling venomous snakes.

The third edition, published in 2003, included 36 new species and several new paintings. Stebbins considered keeping up-to-date with current scientific literature the most daunting task due to the volume of recent publications. The fourth edition was published posthumously in 2018, with Samuel McGinnis as co-author. It covers 332 species compared to the third edition's 281, a result of taxonomic changes in the preceding 15 years, although only two of the newly included species are illustrated.

== Books ==
- Cyril A. Stebbins; —— (1941). What Bird is That?. Van Nuys, CA: Valley Vista Press.
- Cyril A. Stebbins; —— (1942). Birds of Lassen Volcanic National Park and Vicinity. Van Nuys, CA: Valley Vista Press.
- Loye H. Miller; —— (1947). Birds of the Campus, University of California Los Angeles. University of California Press.
- —— (1951). Amphibians of Western North America. University of California Press.
- —— (1954). Amphibians and Reptiles of Western North America. New York: McGraw-Hill Press.
- —— (1960). Reptiles and Amphibians of the San Francisco Bay Region. University of California Press.
- Alden H. Miller; —— (1964). The Lives of Desert Animals in Joshua Tree National Monument. University of California Press.
- —— (1966). Field Guide to Western Reptiles and Amphibians (1st ed.). Boston: Houghton-Mifflin Co. 2nd ed., 1985; 3rd ed., 2003; 4th ed., 2018
- —— (1972). California Amphibians and Reptiles. University of California Press.
- Tracy I. Storer; Robert L. Usinger; —— James W. Nybakken (1972). General Zoology (5th ed.). New York: McGraw-Hill Press.
- Cyril A. Stebbins; —— (1974). Birds of Yosemite National Park. Yosemite National Park: Yosemite Natural History Association.
- —— Nathan W. Cohen (1997). A Natural History of Amphibians. Princeton University Press. ISBN 9780691102511.
- —— (2009). Connecting With Nature: A Naturalist's Perspective. National Science Teachers Association.
- —— Samuel M. McGinnis (2012). Field Guide to Amphibians and Reptiles of California (Revised ed.). University of California Press.

== Films ==
- Nature Next Door. Sierra Club, National Press. Palo Alto, California. (1962)
- No Room for Wilderness? Lawrence Dawson Productions, San Francisco. (1967)
