= Grennell =

Grennell is a surname. Notable people with the surname include:

- Airini Grennell (1910–1988), New Zealand singer, pianist, and broadcaster
- Dean Grennell (1923–2004), American firearms expert and science fiction author
- George Grennell Jr. (1786–1877), American politician

== See also ==
- Grinnell (surname)
