= MVZ =

MVZ may refer to:

- Mil Moscow Helicopter Plant, Russia
- Museum of Vertebrate Zoology, Berkeley, California, USA
