= Tracy I. Storer =

American zoologist

- Born: August 17, 1889; San Francisco, California
- Died: June 25, 1973 (aged 83); Davis, California
- Education: UC Berkeley
- Spouse: Dr. Ruth Risdon Storer
- Scientific career
- Fields: Zoology
- Workplaces: UC Davis, Museum of Vertebrate Zoology

Tracy Irwin Storer (1889–1973) was an American zoologist known for his contributions to the wildlife of California and the ecology of the Sierra Nevada. He was a professor of zoology at the University of California, Davis for over 30 years. He served as president of several biological societies, including the Cooper Ornithological Club (as a three-time president), Society of Ichthyologists and Herpetologists, the Society of Mammalogists, and the Wildlife Society, and was a fellow of the California Academy of Sciences which in 1968 awarded him the Fellow's Medal, the academy's highest honor.

Storer was born in San Francisco, California August 17, 1889. He attended the University of California, Berkeley where he earned a B.S. in 1912, followed by a M.S. in 1913. From 1914 to 1923 he worked in the Museum of Vertebrate Zoology as an assistant curator of birds and field-naturalist. He worked with the ecologist Joseph Grinnell, with whom he co-authored Animal Life in the Yosemite and The Game Birds of California. Storer received his PhD from U.C. Berkeley in 1921, and in 1923 joined the faculty at the University of California, Davis, where he was the first professor of zoology and later founded the school's Department of Zoology. He retired in 1956 and was given a Doctor of Letters degree by U.C. Davis in 1960. A building on the campus, Storer Hall, is named after him.

Storer died in Davis, California on June 25, 1973.

== Selected works ==
Storer authored or co-authored over 200 books and articles. Some of his more notable works are listed below.

- Joseph Grinnell, Harold C. Bryant and Tracy I. Storer. 1918. The Game Birds of California. University of California Press. Berkeley.
- Joseph Grinnell and Tracy I. Storer. 1918. Animal Life in the Yosemite
- Tracy I. Storer with Lloyd P. Tevis, Jr. 1955 (republished 1978). California Grizzly University of California Press. Berkeley
- Tracy I. Storer and Robert L. Usinger. 1968. Sierra Nevada Natural History. University of California Press. Berkeley
