= Richard C. Banks =

American ornithologist (1931–2021)

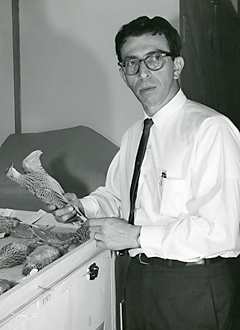
- Born: April 19, 1931; Steubenville, Ohio, U.S.
- Died: October 24, 2021 (aged 90); Alexandria, Virginia, U.S.
- Education: Ohio State University; University of California, Berkeley
- Known for: Founder of the Ornithological Council
- Scientific career
- Fields: Zoology; Ornithology
- Workplaces: Patuxent Wildlife Research Center, U.S. Geological Survey, Smithsonian Institution
- Doctoral advisor: Alden H. Miller

Richard Charles Banks (April 19, 1931 – October 24, 2021) was an American author, ornithologist and Emeritus Research Zoologist on staff with the Patuxent Wildlife Research Center run by the U.S. Geological Survey and stationed at the Smithsonian Institution in Washington, D.C. He is the founder of the Ornithological Council and known for his study of the migratory systems, patterns, and geographic variations of North American birds, primarily focusing on the research and analysis of Greater White-fronted Geese.

In 2011, Banks was named to the Smithsonian's Hall of Fame, established by the Department of Vertebrate, Zoology. The honor was made in recognition of Banks as one of the most influential ornithologists associated with the National Museum of Natural History (NMNH).

== Personal background ==
Richard Charles Banks was born on April 19, 1931, in Steubenville, Ohio. He attended Steubenville High School, graduating in 1949.

During his youth, Banks was an Eagle Scout and enjoyed bird watching. He often participated with his father, who was an amateur birdwatcher and a member of the Wilson Ornithological Society. In 1953, Banks attended his first Wilson Ornithological Society meeting with his parents.

In fall 1949, Banks enrolled in classes at Ohio State University and participated in Reserve Officer Training Corps (ROTC). He graduated in 1953 with a Bachelor of Science degree in Wildlife Conservation, after which he joined the US Army in post-war South Korea, qualifying to serve in the Medical Service Corps, due to his training in biology.

After Banks returned from Korea in 1955, he enrolled in graduate school at the University of California, Berkeley. He earned his Master's (1958) and Ph.D. (1961) degrees under the guidance of doctoral advisor, Alden H. Miller. He was subsequently hired at Berkeley's Museum of Vertebrate Zoology, serving as an assistant curator, specializing in the research and study of white-crowned sparrows.

In 1962, while working at the San Diego Natural History Museum, he met his future wife, Gladys Sparks. They married in 1967. Together, they had two sons, Randy and David.

Richard C. Banks died in Alexandria, Virginia on October 24, 2021, at the age of 90.

== Professional background ==
Toward the end of his final year at Berkeley, Banks participated in a scientific expedition to Cerralvo Island in the Gulf of California. While exploring, he recognized differing characteristics in some of the migratory birds that he was collecting. This discovery led him to apply for a National Science Foundation grant to continue his research. As a result of his findings, he is recognized for naming three subspecies of birds that were indigenous to the island. In 1962, following the completion of his grant, he was offered a job as curator of the birds and mammals collections and exhibits at the San Diego Natural History Museum.

In 1966, Banks joined the staff at the Fish and Wildlife Service in the National Museum of Natural History, where he served as the chief of the bird section. After Richard H. Manville retired, Banks was promoted to director of the Bird and Mammal Labs of the museum. He served as a curator of the Bird Project for the Biological Survey, USGS Biological Resources Discipline, portion of the NMNH for over 38 years, officially retiring in 2005. For years, he remained active at the National Museum, recognized as an Emeritus Research Zoologist.

In addition to his work with the National Museum of Natural History, Banks is recognized for establishing the Ornithological Council. He became active in the American Ornithologists' Union, where he was elected secretary in 1969 and served as president from 1994 to 1996, having previously served in the same capacity with the Wilson Ornithological Society and the Biological Society of Washington.

In 1971, Banks became a member of the American Ornithologists' Union's Committee on Classification and Nomenclature. The Committee publishes the Checklist of North American Birds, which is the official source on the taxonomy of birds in North America. In 1976, the Union began publishing a quarterly newsletter at the recommendation of Banks, who was named as editor. The Ornithological Newsletter was eventually published on a bimonthly basis and circulated to over 5,000 ornithologists. In 1983, Banks participated in the publication of the sixth edition of the Checklist of North American Birds. From 1995 to 2007, he served as the Chair of the Committee. He oversaw publication of the seventh edition in 1997.

== Honors and awards ==
- 1991–1993: President, Wilson Ornithological Society
- 1992: Honorary Member, Cooper Ornithological Society
- 1994–1996: President, American Ornithologists' Union
- 1998: Marion Jenkinson Service Award, American Ornithologists' Union
- 1999: Scientific Achievement Award, Patuxent Wildlife Research Center
- 2001: President, American Association of Zoological Nomenclature
- 2008: William and Nancy Klamm Service Award – Wilson Ornithological Club
- 2011: Smithsonian Institution Hall of Fame – Department of Vertebrate Zoology

== Published works ==
- Banks, Richard C. (1970). "Birds Imported into the United States in 1968", (Fish and Wildlife Service, Special Scientific Report—Wildlife) 64 pages.
- Hubbard, John P.; and Banks, Richard C. (1970). "The Types of Taxa of Harold H. Bailey", Proceedings of the Biological Society of Washington, 83(30): 321–332.
- Banks, Richard C. (1970). "On Ecotypic Variation in Birds", Evolution, 24(4): 829–831.
- Banks, Richard C. (1970). "Re-evaluation of Two Supposed Hybrid Birds", The Wilson Bulletin, 82(3): 331–332.
- Banks, Richard C. (1970). "The Fox Sparrow on the West Slope of the Oregon Cascades", The Condor, 72(3): 369–370.
- Banks, Richard C. (1971). "Publication Dates of the North American Fauna Series", The Auk, 88(3): 676.
- Banks, Richard C. (1972). "Proceedings of the Eighty-ninth Stated Meeting of the American Ornithologists' Union", The Auk, 89(1): 114–162.
- Locke, Louis N.; and Banks, Richard C. (1972). "Avian Cholera in Cedar Waxwings in Ohio", Journal of Wildlife Diseases, 8: 106.
- Banks, Richard C. (1972). "A Systematis's View", Role of Hand-reared Ducks in Waterfowl Management: A Symposium, Bureau of Sport Fisheries and Wildlife, and the Max McGraw Wildlife Foundation. Bureau of Sport Fisheries and Wildlife and Max McGraw Foundation, pp. 117–120.
- Banks, Richard C.; Clench, M. H.; and Barlow, J. C. (1973). "Bird Collections in United-States and Canada", The Auk, 90(1): 136–170.
- Skaar, P. D.; Clapp, Roger B.; and Banks, Richard C. (1973). "Re-Evaluation of some Montana Bird Records", The Condor, 75(1): 132–133.
- Banks, Richard C. (1980). "On Getting Involved", The Auk, 97(3): 637.
- Banks, Richard C.; and Watson, George E. (1984). "Commentary", The Condor, 86(2): 222.
- Banks, Richard C. (1985). "American Black Duck Record from Korea", Journal of Field Ornithology, 56(3): 277.
- Banks, Richard C. (1986). "Subspecies of the Glaucous Gull, Larus-Hyperboreus", (Aves, Charadriiformes). Proceedings of the Biological Society of Washington, 99(1): 149–159.
- Banks, Richard C. (1986). "A Taxonomic Reevaluation of the Plain Pigeon (Columba inornata)". The Auk, 103(3): 629–631.
- Banks, Richard C. (1986). "Subspecies of the Greater Scaup and their Names", Wilson Bulletin, 98(3): 433–444.
- Banks, Richard C.; McDiarmid, Roy W.; and Gardner, Alfred L. (1987). "Checklist of Vertebrates of the United States, the U. S. Territories, and Canada" (U. S. Fish and Wildlife Service, Resource Publication) 79 pages.
- Banks, Richard C. (1988). "Geographic-Variation in the Yellow-Billed Cuckoo", The Condor, 90(2): 473–477.
- Banks, Richard C. (1988). "Obsolete English Names of North American Birds and Their Modern Equivalents", Fish and Wildlife Service, Resource Publication. 37 pages.
- Banks, Richard C. (1989). "(Review of) Speciation and Geographic Variation in Black-tailed Gnatcatchers", Wilson Bulletin, 101: 360–362.
- Banks, Richard C. (1989). "Supposed Northern Records of the Southern Fulmar", Western Birds, 19: 121–124.
- Banks, Richard C.; and Calder, W. A. III. (1989). "Did Lewis and Clark Discover the Broad-tailed Hummingbird (Selasphorus platyceracus)?", Archives of Natural History, 16: 243–244.
- Banks, Richard C. (1990). "Geographic Variation in the Yellow-billed Cuckoo: Corrections and Comments", The Condor, 92(2): 538.
- Banks, Richard C. (1990). "Taxonomic Status of the Coquette Hummingbird of Guerrero, Mexico", The Auk, 107(1): 191–192.
- Banks, Richard C. (1990). "Taxonomic Status of the Rufous-Bellied Chachalaca" (Ortalis-Wagleri), The Condor, 92(3): 749–753.
- Banks, Richard C.; and Dove, Carla J. (1992). "The Generic Name for Crested Caracaras" (Aves, Falconidae), Proceedings of the Biological Society of Washington, 105(3): 420–425.
- Clark, W. S.; and Banks, Richard C. (1992). "The Taxonomic Status of the White-Tailed Kite", Wilson Bulletin, 104(4): 571
- Banks, Richard C. (1993). "[Review of] Illustrations of the Birds of California, Texas, Oregon, British and Russian America, by John Cassin", 1991 reprint of 1856 edition. The Auk, 110: 420–421.
- Banks, Richard C.; Goodman, S. M.; Lanyon, S. M.; and Schulenberg, T. S. (1993). "Type Specimens and Basic Principles of Avian Taxonomy", The Auk, 110(2): 413–414.
- Clapp, Roger B.; and Banks, Richard C. (1993). "Nesting seasons, nest sites, and clutch sizes of crows in Virginia", The Raven, 64(2): 90–98.
- Banks, Richard C.; and Springer, P. F. (1994). "A Century of Population Trends of Waterfowl in Western North America", Studies in Avian Biology, 15: 134–146.
- Banks, Richard C.; and Browning, M. R. (1995). "Comments on the status of revived old names for some North American birds", The Auk, 112(3): 633–648.
- Banks, Richard C. (1995). "Ornithology at the U.S. National Museum of Natural History", Contributions to the History of North American Ornithology. Memoirs of the Nuttall Ornithological Club, 12: 33–53.
- Browning, M. R.; and Banks, Richard C. (1996). "Bombycilla cedrorum Vieillot, (1808) and Troglodytes aedon Vieillot, (1809)" (Aves, Passeriformes): Proposed Conservation of the Specific Names, Bulletin of Zoological Nomenclature, 53: 187–190.
- Banks, Richard C. (1997). "The Name of Lawrence' Flycatcher", The Era of Allan R. Phillips, A Festchrift, Albuquerque, NM: Horizons Communications, pp. 21–24.
- Banks, Richard C.; Fitzpatrick, John W.; Howell, Thomas R.; Johnson, Ned K.; Monroe Jr., Burt L.; Ouellet, Henri; Remsen Jr., J. V.; and Storer, Robert W. (1997). "Forty-first Supplement to the American Ornithologists' Union Check-list of North American Birds", The Auk, 114(3): 542–552.
- Dove, Carla J.; and Banks, Richard C. (1999). "A taxonomic study of crested caracaras", (Falconidae). Wilson Bulletin, 111(3): 330–339.
- Banks, Richard C.; and Browning, M. R. (1999). "Questions about Thayer's Gull", Ontario Birds, 17: 124–130.
- Banks, Richard C. (2000). "The Cuban Martin in Florida", Florida Field Naturalist, 28: 50–52.
- Banks, Richard C.; Cicero, Carla; Dunn, J. L.; Kratter, A. W.; Rasmussen, Pamela C.; Remsen, J. V.; Rising, J. D.; and Stotz, D. F. (2002). "Forty-third supplement to the American Ornithologists' Union Check-list of North American Birds", The Auk, 119(3): 897–906.
- Banks, Richard C.; Cicero, Carla; Dunn, J. L.; Kratter, A. W.; Rasmussen, Pamela C.; Remsen, J. V.; Rising, J. D.; and Stotz, D. F. (2003). "Forty-fourth supplement to the American Ornithologists' Union Check-list of North American Birds", The Auk, 120(3): 923–931.
- Banks, Richard C.; Cicero, Carla; Dunn, J. L.; Kratter, A. W.; Rasmussen, Pamela C.; Remsen, J. V.; Rising, J. D.; and Stotz, D. F. (2004). "Forty-fifth Supplement to the American Ornithologists' Union Check-list of North American Birds", The Auk, 121(3): 985–995.
- Woolfenden, G. E.; and Banks, Richard C. (2004). "A specimen of the Varied Thrush from Florida", Florida Field Naturalist, 32: 48–50.
- Banks, Richard C.; Cicero, Carla; Dunn, J. L.; Kratter, A. W.; Rasmussen, Pamela C.; Remsen, J. V.; Rising, J. D.; and Stotz, D. F. (2005). "Forty-sixth supplement to the American ornithologists' union check-list of North American Birds", The Auk, 122(3): 1026–1031.
- Banks, Richard C.; Cicero, Carla; Dunn, Jon L.; Kratter, Andrew W.; Rasmussen, Pamela C.; Remsen, J. V., Jr.; Rising, James D.; and Stotz, Douglas F. (2006). "Forty-seventh supplement to the American Ornithologists' Union Check-list of North American birds", The Auk, 123(3): 926–936.
- Banks, Richard C.; Chesser, Robert Terry; Cicero, Carla; Dunn, Jon L.; Kratter, Andrew W.; Lovette, Rby J.; Rasmussen, Pamela C.; Remsen, J. V., Jr.; Rising, James D.; and Stotz, Douglas F. (2007). "Forty-eighth supplement to the American ornithologists' union Check-List of North American Birds", The Auk, 124(3): 1109–1115.
- Banks, Richard C.; and Gibson, Daniel D. (2007). "The correct type locality of Spizella breweri", The Auk, 124(3): 1083–1085.
- Olson, Storrs L.; and Banks, Richard C. (2007). "Lectotypification of Larus smithsonianus Coues, 1862", (Aves: Laridae), Proceedings of the Biological Society of Washington, 120(4): 382–386.
- Banks, Richard C.; Chesser, Robert Terry; Cicero, Carla; Dunn, J. L.; Kratter, A. W.; Lovette, I. J.; Rasmussen, Pamela C.; Remsen, J. V.; Rising, J. D.; Stotz, D. F.; and Winker, Kevin. (2008). "Forty-ninth supplement to the American Ornithologists' Union - Check-list of north American birds", The Auk, 125(3): 756–766.
- Chesser, Robert T.; Banks, Richard C.; Barker, F. Keith; Cicero, Carla; Dunn, Jon L.; Kratter, Andrew W.; Lovette, Irby J.; Rasmussen, Pamela C.; Remsen, J. V. Jr.; Rising, James D.; Stotz, Douglas F.; and Winker, Kevin. (2009). "Fiftieth Supplement to the American Ornithologists' Union Check-List of North American Birds", The Auk, 126(3): 705–714. doi:10.1525/auk.2009.8709
- Lovette, Irby J.; Perez-Eman, Jorge L.; Sullivan, John P.; Banks, Richard C.; Fiorentino, Isabella; Cordoba-Cordoba, Sergio; Echeverry-Galvis, Maria; Barker, F. Keith; Burns, Kevin J.; Klicka, John; Lanyon, Scott M.; and Bermingham, Eldredge. (2010). "A comprehensive multilocus phylogeny for the wood-warblers and a revised classification of the Parulidae", (Ayes), Molecular Phylogenetics and Evolution, 57(2): 753–770. doi:10.1016/j.ympev.2010.07.018
- Gibson, Daniel D. and Banks, Richard C. (2010). "Revised type locality of the Whiskered Auklet Aethia pygmaea", (Ayes: Alcidae), Proceedings of the Biological Society of Washington, 123 (3): 193–195.
- Klicka, John; and Banks, Richard C. (2011). "A generic name for some sparrows" (Aves: Emberizidae), Zootaxa, 2793: 67–68.
- Banks, Richard C. (2011). "Taxonomy of Greater White-fronted Geese", (Aves: Anatidae), Proceedings of the Biological Society of Washington, 124(3): 226–233.

== See also ==
- Smithsonian Migratory Bird Center
