= Harold C. Bryant =

American ornithologist and zoologist

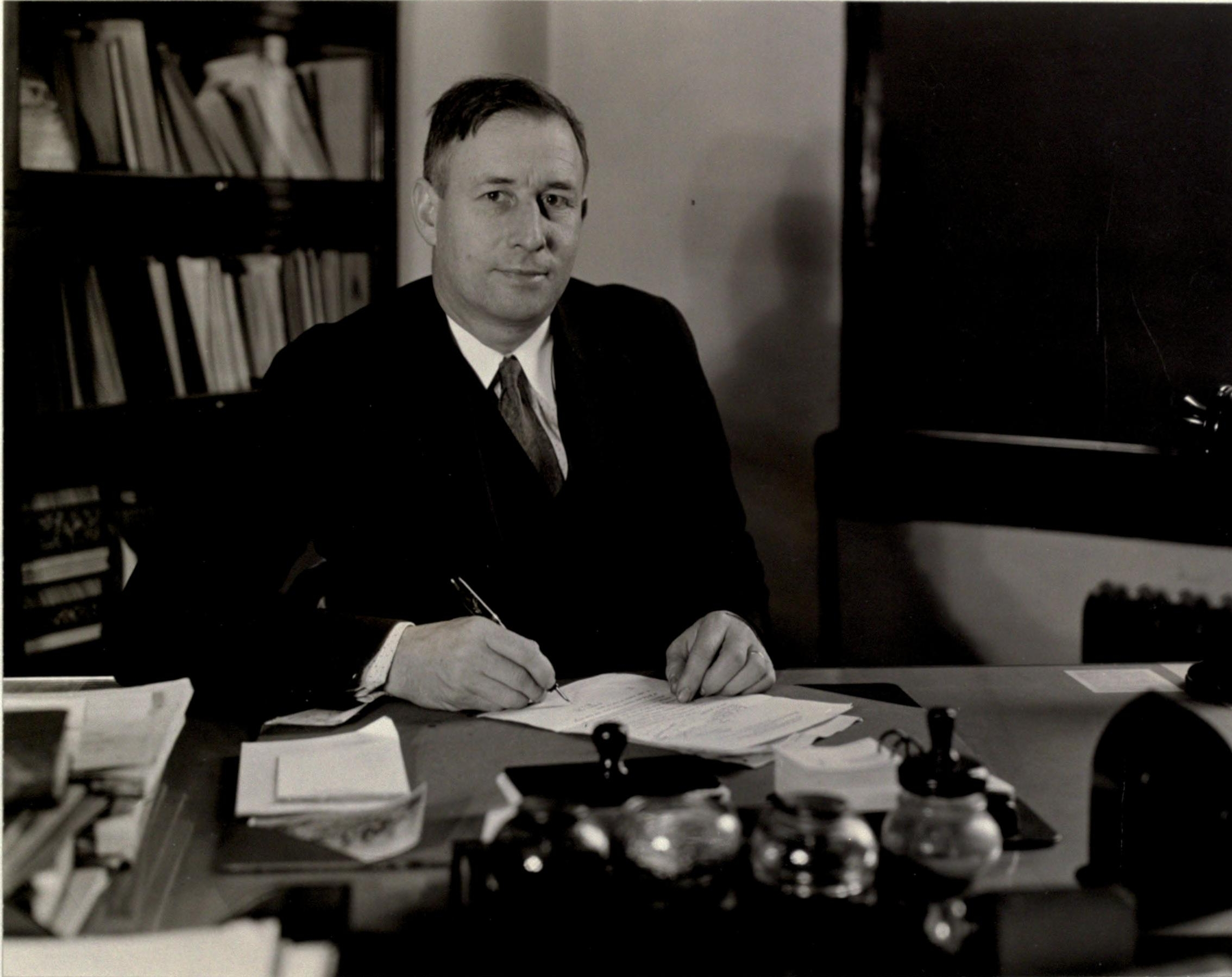
Bryant in office, 1933

Harold Child Bryant (30 January 1886 – 14 July 1968) was an American ornithologist and zoologist who served in the US National Park Service and was involved in the establishment of the system of park naturalists.

Bryant was born in Pasadena and was educated BS from Pomona College followed by an MS and PhD from the University of California, Berkeley. He then worked at the Museum of Vertebrate Zoology from 1910 to 1927 serving also as a field trip leader for the University of California Extension department. Along with Joseph Grinnell and supported by a local land agent C.M. Goethe he worked as a nature guide at Yosemite Valley from 1919. He became the first director of the Yosemite School of Field Natural History in 1925. In 1930 he became an assistant director for the research and education branch of the National Park Service. He acted as a consultant to the Olympic National Park in 1938 and served as a superintendent of the Grand Canyon National Park from the next year. He retired in 1954 and received a Distinguished Service Award from the Department of the Interior.
