= Society of Canadian Ornithologists =

Canadian non-profit organization

The Society of Canadian Ornithologists, or Société des Ornithologistes du Canada, is an ornithological non-profit organization serving Canada’s ornithological community. It was founded in 1983, and is a member of the Ornithological Council.

The goals of the Society are to encourage and support research towards the understanding and conservation of Canadian birds, serve as a professional society for both amateur and professional Canadian ornithologists, represent Canadian ornithologists within professional ornithological societies, publish information about Canadian birds, and recognise excellence in research, conservation and mentorship in the Canadian ornithological community.

== Publications and awards ==
Avian Conservation and Ecology
- Discipline: Ornithology
- Language: English

Publication details
- Publisher: Society of Canadian Ornithologists / Birds Canada

Standard abbreviations
- ISO 4: Avian Conserv. Ecol.

Indexing
- ISSN: 1712-6568

Links
- Journal homepage

The Society produces the journal Avian Conservation and Ecology (French: Écologie et Conservation des Oiseaux), which is published jointly with Birds Canada, as well as a newsletter, Picoides. It makes two annual awards, the Doris Huestis Speirs Award, which is given for outstanding lifetime contributions to Canadian ornithology, and the Jamie Smith Memorial Mentoring Award.

== Annual meeting ==
Year	Meeting Location	Notes
2022	Virtual	
2021	Virtual	with the American Ornithological Society
2020	San Juan, Puerto Rico (virtual)	7th North American Ornithological Congress
2019	Quebec City, Quebec	
2018	Vancouver, British Columbia	27th International Ornithological Congress
2017	East Lansing, Michigan	with the American Ornithological Society
2016	Washington, D.C.	6th North American Ornithological Congress
2015	Wolfville, Nova Scotia	with the Wilson Ornithological Society and Association of Field Ornithologists
2014	Estes Park, Colorado	with the American Ornithologists' Union and Cooper Ornithological Society
2013	Winnipeg, Manitoba	
2012	Vancouver, British Columbia	5th North American Ornithological Congress
2011	Moncton, New Brunswick	
2010	San Diego, California	with the American Ornithologists' Union and Cooper Ornithological Society
2009	Edmonton, Alberta	
2008	Portland, Oregon	with the American Ornithologists' Union and Cooper Ornithological Society
2007	Lake Opinicon, Ontario	
2006	Veracruz, Mexico	4th North American Ornithological Congress
2005	Halifax, Nova Scotia	
2004	Quebec City, Quebec	with the American Ornithologists' Union
2003	Saskatoon, Saskatchewan	
2002	New Orleans, Louisiana	3rd North American Ornithological Congress
2001	Seattle, Washington	with the American Ornithologists' Union
2000	St. John's, Newfoundland and Labrador	with the American Ornithologists' Union and British Ornithologists' Union
1999	Montreal, Quebec	
1998	Vancouver, British Columbia	
1997	Peterborough, Ontario	
1996	Fredericton, New Brunswick	First stand-alone meeting
1995	Cincinnati, Ohio	with the American Ornithologists' Union
1994	Missoula, Montana	1st North American Ornithological Congress
1993	Guelph, Ontario	with the Wilson Ornithological Society
1992	Ames, Iowa	with the American Ornithologists' Union
1991	Montreal, Quebec	with the American Ornithologists' Union
1990	Los Angeles, California	with the American Ornithologists' Union
1989	Pittsburgh, Pennsylvania	with the American Ornithologists' Union
1988	Fayetteville, Arkansas	with the American Ornithologists' Union
1987	San Francisco, California	with the American Ornithologists' Union
1986	Ottawa, Ontario	with the 19th International Ornithological Congress
1985	Tempe, Arizona	with the American Ornithologists' Union
1984	Lawrence, Kansas	with the American Ornithologists' Union
1983	Chicago, Illinois	with the American Ornithologists' Union

== See also ==
- Open access in Canada
