= Jemez Mountains salamander =

Conservation status
- Endangered (IUCN 3.1)

- Endangered (ESA)

Scientific classification
- Kingdom: Animalia
- Phylum: Chordata
- Class: Amphibia
- Order: Urodela
- Family: Plethodontidae
- Genus: Plethodon
- Species: P. neomexicanus

Binomial name
- Plethodon neomexicanus Stebbins & Riemer, 1950
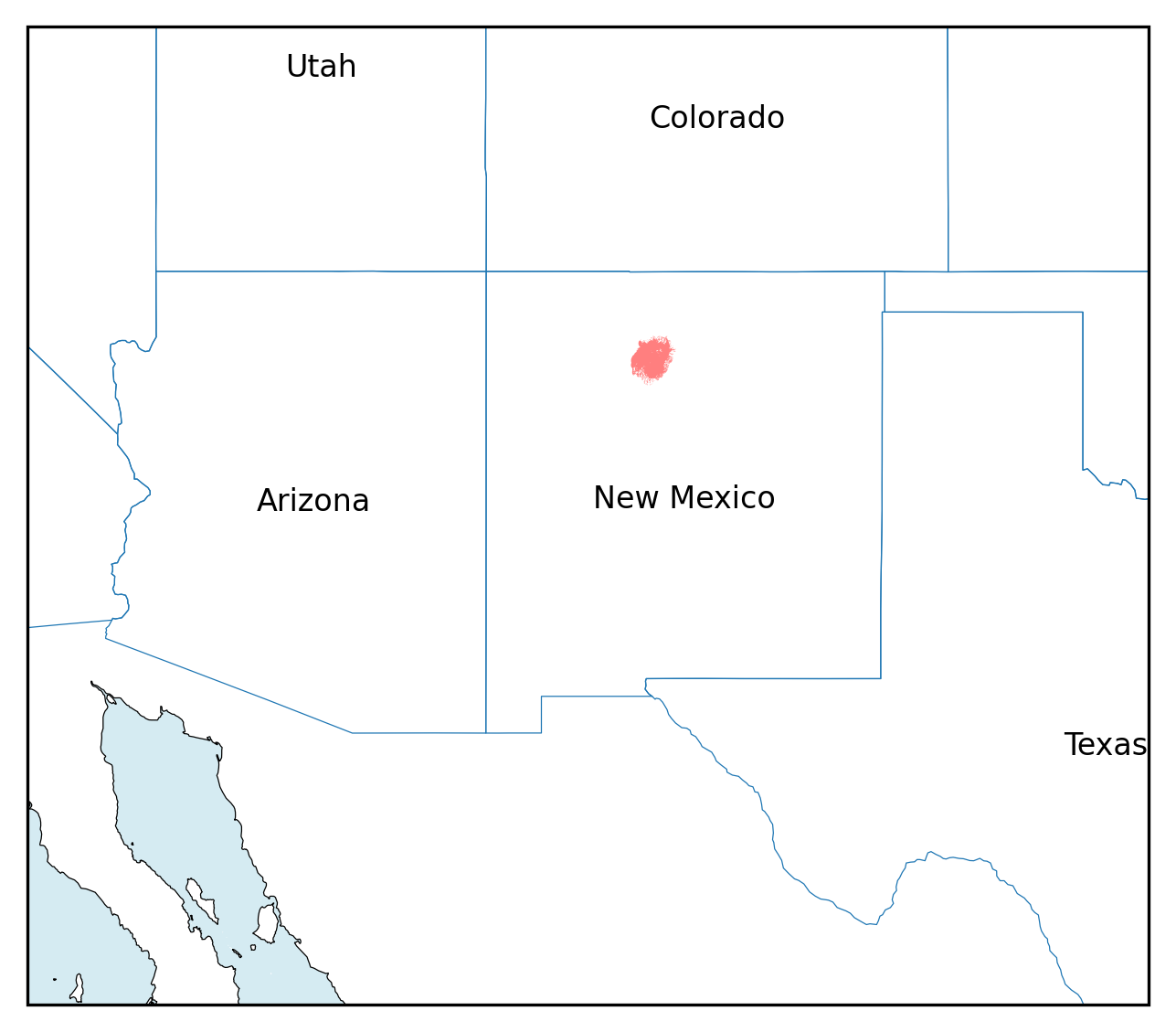

Species of amphibian

The Jemez Mountains salamander (Plethodon neomexicanus) is a species of salamander in the family Plethodontidae, endemic to New Mexico in the United States. Its natural habitat is temperate forest. It is threatened by habitat loss, is experiencing a rapid decline, and was placed on the IUCN Red List in 2013.

== Endangered habitat ==
Map of the endangered habitat

== Media ==
Image of a Jemez Mountains Salamander
