= Neotropical Ornithological Society =

Non-profit organization

The Neotropical Ornithological Society, or Sociedad de Ornitología Neotropical, is an ornithological non-profit organization, with its principal objective the study and conservation of Neotropical birds and their habitats, including both their breeding and non-breeding areas. It was founded in 1987 by Dr Mario A. Ramos Olmos, and is a member of the Ornithological Council.

The Society produces the journal Neotropical Ornithology, which publishes papers in Spanish, English and Portuguese. It organises the Neotropical Ornithological Congress and the Francois Vuilleumier Fund for research on Neotropical birds.

== See also ==
- Neotropical Birds Online, an online encyclopedia
