= Robert T. Orr =

American biologist, zoologist and natural historian

- Born: August 17, 1908; San Francisco, California, US
- Died: June 23, 1994 (aged 85); Larkspur, California, US
- Education: University of California, Berkeley
- Known for: Curating zoological collections at California Academy of Sciences; Textbook on vertebrate zoology Mycology guidebooks
- Spouse: Margaret Cunningham (m. 1972)
- Scientific career
- Fields: Vertebrate zoology Natural history Mycology
- Workplaces: Stanford University; University of California, Berkeley; University of San Francisco; California Academy of Sciences
- Doctoral advisor: Joseph Grinnell

Robert Thomas Orr (August 17, 1908 – June 23, 1994) was an American biologist known for his work as a zoologist and natural historian.

== Early life and education ==
Orr was born in San Francisco, California to Robert Harry Orr and Clara Cockburn Orr. He received his B.S. degree in biology from the University of San Francisco in 1929. His M.A. and Ph.D. degrees were earned at the University of California, Berkeley while studying in the laboratory of Joseph Grinnell.

== Career ==
Orr spent most of his career in San Francisco as curator of the ornithology and mammalogy collections at the California Academy of Sciences (1936–1963), and a faculty member at the University of San Francisco (1942–1963). He served as associate director of the California Academy of Sciences from 1964 to 1975. Orr's research consisted studies of seals, sea lions and whales along the California coast. In addition to his work in mammalogy and ornithology, Orr was considered an authority on wild mushrooms. He was known for leading mushroom hunting expeditions in the moist coastal forests of Mendocino County, California, delighting amateur "Mendocino Mushroomers" with tales of mushrooms and fungi. Orr served as President of the Pacific Division of the American Association for the Advancement of Science from 1976 to 1977. He died on June 23, 1994, at his home in Larkspur, California at the age of 86. The San Francisco Chronicle reported he had a long illness.

== Selected publications ==
Orr wrote 260 scientific and popular articles mostly on mammalogy and ornithology. He also wrote three books on fungi, and he co-authored (with his wife, Margaret Cunningham Orr) a book on western North American wildflowers. He authored a textbook on vertebrate biology that was first released in 1961, with the final fifth edition released in 1981. His publications include:

- Orr, R.T. 1940. The rabbits of California. Occasional Papers of the California Academy of Sciences 19:1–227, 10 pls., 30 figs.
- —— 1945. A study of captive Galapagos finches of the genus Geospiza. Condor 47:177–201.
- —— 1954. Natural history of the pallid bat, Antrozous pallidus (Le Conte). Proceedings of the California Academy of Sciences 28:165–246.
- —— 1965. The Animal Kingdom Macmillan, New York. 380pp.
- —— 1972. Marine Mammals of California University of California Press, Berkeley. 64pp. ISBN 0-520-02077-4
- —— and M.C. Orr. 1974. Wildflowers of Western America. Knopf, New York. 270pp. ISBN 0-394-49363-X
- —— and D.B. Orr. 1980. Mushrooms of Western North America University of California Press, Berkeley. 293pp. ISBN 978-0-520-03656-7
