= Doris Huestis Speirs =

Canadian ornithologist (1894-1989)

Doris Speirs
- Born: Doris Huestis; October 7, 1894; Toronto, Ontario
- Died: October 24, 1989 (aged 95); Toronto, Ontario
- Known for: ornithologist, artist
- Spouse(s): W. Gordon Mills (d. 1916); J. Murray Speirs (m. 1939)

Doris Louise Huestis Speirs (née, Huestis; also known as Doris Huestis Mills; 7 October 1894 – 24 October 1989) was a Canadian ornithologist, artist and poet. The "Doris Huestis Speirs Award" is an annual prize bestowed by the Society of Canadian Ornithologists to "an individual who has made outstanding lifetime contributions in Canadian ornithology". A member of the Art Students' League of Toronto and an art patron, she was the first and likely the only Canadian to buy a Georgia O'Keeffe painting.

== Early years ==
Born in Toronto, Ontario in 1894, Speirs was the daughter of Archibald Morrison and Florence Gooderham (Hamilton) Huestis. She attended Toronto Model School (1900–1902) and Havergal College (1902–1914). At the age of 17, she traveled through Europe with her music teacher, visiting art galleries and collecting sepia prints.

== Career ==
Encouraged by J. E. H. MacDonald, Lawren Harris, and A.Y. Jackson, Speirs was a self-taught painter. An amateur who was among the earliest Canadian painters to experiment in an abstract mode, she exhibited with the Group of Seven (1926, 1928, 1930, 1931) and the Canadian Group of Painters. Her work is in the collection of the Robert McLaughlin Gallery, Oshawa.

Speirs belonged to a small group of freelance painters, mostly untrained, who received encouragement from the Group. She influenced two of her friends, Bess Larkin Housser (later Harris' wife) and Marjorie Meredith, and a sister, Marion Miller, to paint as well, each reaching a certain degree of success with their art.

In the 1920s, Speirs began to purchase art work. As early as 1924, she visited New York City art galleries, where she met the artists Rockwell Kent, Georgia O'Keeffe, and John Marin, the gallery owner, Alfred Stieglitz (O'Keeffe's husband), as well as the art critics, Walter Pach and C. Lewis Hind. In 1925, she purchased one of O'Keeffe's paintings from the Stieglitz gallery, the first Canadian to buy an O'Keeffe painting. It was willed to the Art Gallery of Ontario upon Speirs' death. Speirs also pioneered a rental system for artwork, approaching the artists of the Group of Seven to participate. After writing to The Christian Science Monitor, describing what she was doing, the rental system generated interest among readers.

Her painting ended in 1937 as Speirs' attention turned more and more to the study of birds. She was a patron of the Wilson Ornithological Society, as well as a member of the American Ornithologists' Union and the Cooper Ornithological Society. She was a founding member of the Margaret Morse Nice Ornithological Club and the Pickering Naturalists' Club. For her work as a prominent contributor to ornithological literature on the evening grosbeak and Lincoln's sparrow, the Society of Canadian Ornithologists bestow the annual "Doris Huestis Speirs Award" in her honor. Exercise for Psyche, the collection of Speirs' poems dating from 1922 to 1972, was published in 1973.

== Personal life ==
Speirs affiliated with the Church of Christ, Scientist. She married firstly W. Gordon Mills (died 1916), an executive with Eaton's, who was also a poet, art critic and elected member of the Art Gallery of Toronto. She met J. Murray Speirs while he was in graduate school studying ornithology; they married in 1939, and he subsequently became a professor of zoology at the University of Toronto. Speirs had two children. She died in Ajax, Ontario in 1989.
