= Cyril A. Stebbins =

US agriculture educator (1880–1953)

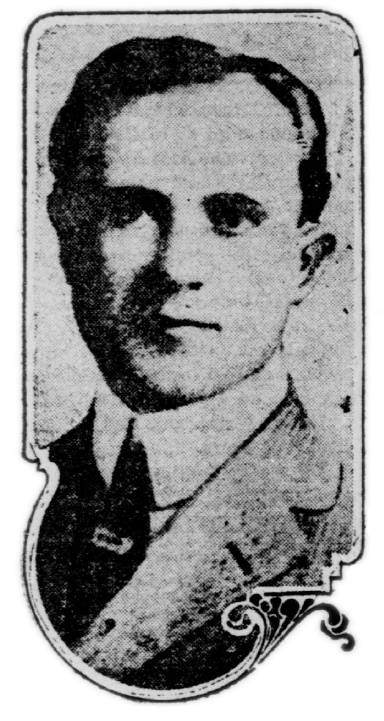
- Stebbins circa 1912
- Born: June 20, 1880; Harrisville, Wisconsin
- Died: February 26, 1953; Los Angeles, California
- Education: Chico State Normal School; University of California, Berkeley
- Occupation: Agricultural educator
- Employers: Chico State Normal School; University of California, Berkeley
- Spouse: Louise Beck Stebbins
- Children: 7, including Robert C. Stebbins

Cyril Adelbert Stebbins (1880–1953) was an American educator involved with nature and agricultural education. His publications in the early twentieth century were influential in promoting gardening in children's education, and he wrote much of the curriculum for the United States School Garden Army, a federal victory garden project during World War I. He wrote several publications with Ernest Brown Babcock and published several field guides to birds with his son Robert C. Stebbins.

== Biography ==
Cyril Stebbins was born in Harrisville, Wisconsin on June 20, 1880, the son of A. O. Stebbins, of English descent, and Bessie Fuller. His family moved to South Dakota and then Minneapolis, Minnesota, where he attended North Community High School, playing on the baseball and football teams and graduating in 1898. Soon after, he moved to Chico, California, and entered the Chico State Normal School (now California State University, Chico), graduating from that institution in 1900. During the majority of the next decade, Stebbins taught at several schools in Glenn, Colusa, and Solano counties. He first became a teacher in the schools of Glenn County, and later became principal of a school in Arbuckle, and remained in that city three years; from there he filled the position of principal of the grammar schools in Dixon for one year; finally he became an instructor in the Chico State Normal for three years. Stebbins then entered the University of California, Berkeley, and in 1910 received his degree of Bachelor of Science, and was appointed as instructor in the Agricultural Educational Division of the university. He taught in this department for two years, in the meantime receiving his master's degree, in 1912. During his time at Berkeley he organized a community garden project where local children grew fruits and vegetables for profit. In 1913 he returned to Chico to become the head of the Biological Science Division of the State Normal. Upon his departure from Berkeley, two petitions were filed to the U.C. Regents–one from parents and one from children–urging that he be retained and given sufficient funding to continue his work on the children's gardening projects.

Stebbins was active in youth education and employment. During his activities as one of the directors of the California State Fair, he initiated the idea of an industrial vocational department for grammar and high school boys. It was instituted in the annual State Fair in 1916, with Stebbins in charge, premiums aggregating a thousand dollars being offered that year. The development and success of the undertaking warranted premiums totaling two thousand dollars the following year, and it became one of the most popular attractions, and the exhibit became a permanent part of the fair. His contributions to industrial and vocational education, include Principles of Agriculture Through the Home and the School Garden, a three-hundred-page volume; and, with Ernest Brown Babcock, Elementary School Agriculture, both published by the Macmillan Company. He was also editor of The Junior Agriculturist, published in Chico. Incident to his scientific pursuits, Stebbins occasionally contributed articles to the Nature Study Review, the San Francisco Call; the Agricultural Journal, Town and Orchard, and other agricultural and educational journals.

In 1917, Stebbins was appointed by the Federal Government as Regional Director of the United States School Garden Army for the Western States, for which he wrote curriculum and promoted the United States School Garden movement. Being detailed by the Commissioner of Education at Washington, he edited a series of films dealing with agriculture and gardening, which were widely distributed in theaters and in schools, to supplement the use of textbooks in gardening and agriculture. California Governor Hiram Johnson appointed Stebbins a member of the Recreation Inquiry Committee. The committee made a recreation survey of California and published its findings in a bulletin published by the State for general distribution and given a wide circulation.

Stebbins was a state chairman of the School Garden Association of America; a member of the California Peach Growers' Association, in which he was trustee for the Butte County Association; and a member of the California Prune and Apricot Growers Association and the California Almond Growers Exchange.

== Personal life and family ==
In Berkeley, Stebbins married Louise Beck, born in Switzerland and educated in California's public schools and the State Normal School. In the Chico area, the Stebbins family lived on a 15-acre small-scale ranch where they grew almonds, and plums, then later moved to a 20-acre ranch and primarily grew almonds, peaches, and watermelons. Around 1924, Stebbins and his family moved to Southern California, living first in Pomona, then in Sherman Oaks, Los Angeles, where Stebbins taught hygiene and agriculture at North Hollywood High School. Cyril and Louise had seven children; three boys and four girls. Their eldest child, Robert, would become a noted herpetologist and illustrator, and would co-author several field guides to birds with Cyril; in 1941 their first co-production, What Bird is That?, was printed in the family garage in Van Nuys. Stebbins died in 1953 and is interred at Forest Lawn Memorial Park (Hollywood Hills).

== Books ==
- Cyril A. Stebbins (1908). A Guide to the Birds of the Pacific Coast. Chico, CA: State Normal School.
- Ernest B. Babcock; Cyril A. Stebbins (1911). Elementary School Agriculture: A Teacher's Manual to accompany Hilgard and Osterhout's "Agriculture for Schools of the Pacific Slope". New York: The Macmillan Company.
- Cyril A. Stebbins (1913). The Principles of Agriculture Through the School and the Home Garden. New York: The Macmillan Company.
- Cyril A. Stebbins (1928). Junior Science. New York: The Macmillan Company.
- Cyril A. Stebbins; Robert C. Stebbins (1941). What Bird is That?. Van Nuys, CA: Valley Vista Press.
- Cyril A. Stebbins; Robert C. Stebbins (1942). Birds of Lassen Volcanic National Park and Vicinity. Van Nuys, CA: Valley Vista Press.
- Cyril A. Stebbins; Robert C. Stebbins (1974). Birds of Yosemite National Park. Yosemite National Park: Yosemite Natural History Association.

== Cited sources ==
- Hayden-Smith, Rose (2014). Sowing the Seeds of Victory: American Gardening Programs of World War I. Jefferson, N.C.: McFarland & Company. ISBN 9780786470204. OCLC 888080393.
- Luckenbach, Roger (1985). "Robert Stebbins: A Life of Devotion to Detail". Pacific Discovery. 38 (2). California Academy of Sciences: 34–43. OCLC 1761670.
- Mansfield, George C. (1918). "Cyril A. Stebbins, M.S.". History of Butte County, California, with Biographical Sketches of the Leading Men and Women of the County who have been Identified with its Growth and Development from the Early Days to the Present. Los Angeles: Historic Record Company. pp. 705–706. OCLC 6130897.
- Mulcahy, Daniel G.; Mahoney, Meredith J. (2006). "Robert Cyril Stebbins". Copeia. 2006 (3): 563–572. doi:10.1643/0045-8511(2006)2006[563:rcs]2.0.co;2. JSTOR 4098723. S2CID 85624152.

Attribution
