= Elizabeth Grinnell =

American writer, clubwoman and naturalist

Elizabeth Pratt Grinnell
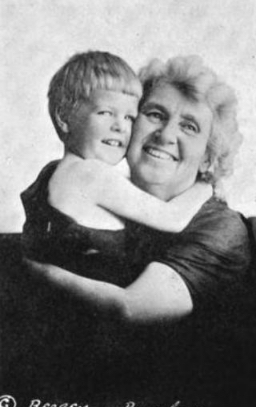
- Grinnell with her grandson Willard, from a 1913 publication.
- Born: Sarah Elizabeth Pratt; May 9, 1851; Brooks, Maine
- Died: July 6, 1935 (aged 84); Sausalito, California
- Occupations: writer, naturalist

Sarah Elizabeth Pratt Grinnell (May 9, 1851 – July 6, 1935) was an American writer, clubwoman, and naturalist, based in Pasadena, California.

== Early life ==
Sarah Elizabeth Pratt was born in Brooks, Maine, the daughter of Joseph Howland Pratt and Martha Eunice Hanson Pratt. Her parents were Quakers.

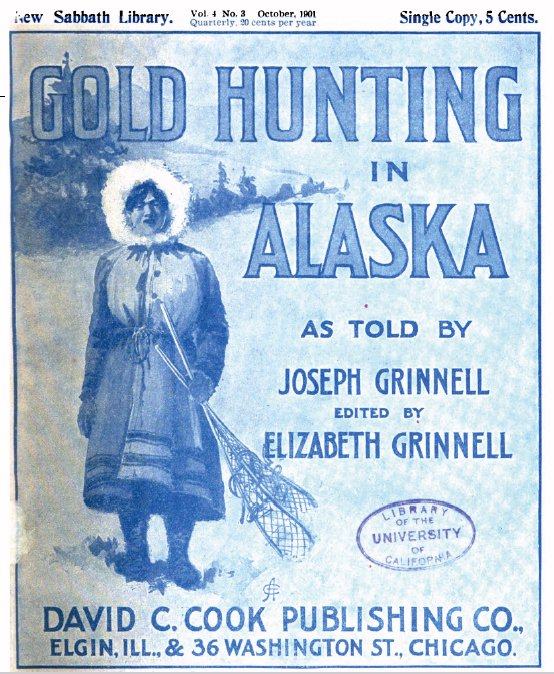
Gold Hunting in Alaska, by Joseph Grinnell and Elizabeth Grinnell

== Career ==
In 1904, Elizabeth Grinnell was a founding member of the Pasadena Audubon Society. Philanthropist Margaret Olivia Slocum Sage was a frequent visitor to Grinnell's home and a benefactor of the society's work. Grinnell provided photographs of birds to Vernon Lyman Kellogg for his textbook Elementary Zoology (1901). She also owned and bred goats, and raised chickens. She protested city regulations limiting the possession of chickens and cows. "Cows sometimes moo and good laying hens do cackle. Trolleys make a noise and so do wagons rattling over pavements," she argued.

Grinnell was a popular speaker on "birds and bees", and wrote at least seven books, some of them in collaboration with her elder son, Joseph Grinnell, a zoologist and museum director. Their books together were Our Feathered Friends (1898), Birds of Song and Story (1901), Gold Hunting in Alaska (1901), and Stories of Our Western Birds (1903). Other books by Grinnell were How John and I Brought Up the Child (1894), John and I and the Church (1897), For the Sake of a Name (1900), A Morning with the Bees (1905), and Thoughts for the Kit-Bag (1918). She also wrote articles and stories for Sunset magazine.

Grinnell was active in the Humane Society of Pasadena. Her work with the society extended beyond animal protection to the care of human orphans, the prevention of child abuse, and the promotion of film censorship for the "morality of the city's youth."

== Personal life ==
Elizabeth Pratt married Fordyce Grinnell (1844–1923), a medical doctor, in New Hampshire in 1874. They had two sons, Joseph (1877–1939) and Fordyce (1882–1943), and a daughter, Elizabeth (1883–1929). Elizabeth Pratt Grinnell moved to Sausalito in the 1920s, and died there in 1935, aged 84 years. "She was a little grey-haired woman somewhat stooped, whose hair falling about her face and shoulders gave her an almost witch-like appearance as she went about clad in male attire," noted a local newspaper.

Some of Elizabeth Grinnell's letters are in the Joseph Grinnell Papers at the Bancroft Library in Berkeley, California, and in the Fordyce Grinnell Jr. Papers at the Autry National Center in Los Angeles.
