= Ornithological Council =

International association of ornithological organisations

The Ornithological Council is an association of ornithological organisations based in the Americas involved in bird study and conservation. It was established by Richard C. Banks and incorporated in Washington, D.C., in 1992 as a nonprofit organization. Its original members comprised the American Ornithologists' Union, Association of Field Ornithologists, Colonial Waterbirds Society (now the Waterbird Society), Cooper Ornithological Society, Pacific Seabird Group, Raptor Research Foundation and Wilson Ornithological Society. Since then they have been joined by CIPAMEX, the Neotropical Ornithological Society, the Society of Canadian Ornithologists and the Society for the Conservation and Study of Caribbean Birds.

The Council focuses not only on issues affecting birds and their survival, but also the needs of ornithologists. It tries to resolve conflicts and promotes sound management and the sustainable use of natural resources. Issues include funding for research and educational programs; government regulations and permits for research activities; decision-making in habitat and biodiversity management; the impacts of birds on fisheries, in agriculture, and in urban areas; threatened species; the role of birds in ecosystems; and standards concerning the use and maintenance of live birds in research.
