= Eileen Lacey =

American biologist

Eileen A. Lacey (b. 1961) is an American biologist who specializes in the evolution of behavioral diversity among vertebrates. Lacey’s research focuses on identifying ecological causes of sociality and assessing the genetic consequences of sociality in subterranean rodents. She is most known for her research on the social structure of naked mole rats and her arguments regarding the eusociality continuum

== Biography ==
Lacey spent her undergraduate years at Cornell University where she established her research on mole rats in the laboratory. Lacey then went on to pursue her Masters and Ph.D. (1991) at the University of Michigan. Her doctoral thesis was "Reproductive and dispersal strategies of male arctic ground squirrels (Spermophilus parryii plesius)" ,

== Career ==
Lacey is currently a Professor of Integrative Biology at the University of California, Berkeley, where she manages the Lacey Lab. The Lacey Lab focuses on vertebrate social behavior and population biology and encompasses a variety of taxa and topics. Furthermore, the Lacy Lab focuses on the identifying ecological causes of sociality and accessing its genetic consequences. She thoroughly tests ecological hypotheses to better understand why some animals live in groups by comparing subterranean rodent species and their social behaviors. Eileen Lacey has published findings from her studies in various scientific journals. She is also the co-editor of a comprehensive work on subterranean rodents, Lacey, Eileen A., James L. Patton, and Guy N. Cameron. Life Underground: The Biology of Subterranean Rodents. Chicago: University of Chicago Press, 2000. ISBN 9780226467283

== Selected articles ==
- Paul W. Sherman, Eileen A. Lacey, Hudson K. Reeve, Laurent Keller, (1995)"Forum: The eusociality continuum Behavioral Ecology," Volume 6, Issue 1, Spring 1995, Pages 102–108, https://doi.org/10.1093/beheco/6.1.102 (open access)
- Lacey, E.A. 2004. Sociality reduces individual direct fitness in a communally breeding rodent, the colonial tuco-tuco (Ctenomys sociabilis). Behavioral Ecology & Sociobiology, in press.
- Lacey, E.A. and J. R. Wieczorek. 2003. The ecology of sociality in rodents: a ctenomyid perspective. Journal of Mammalogy 84:1198-1211.
- Hambuch, T.M. and E.A. Lacey. 2002. Enhanced selection for MHC diversity in social tuco-tucos. Evolution 56:841-845.
- Lacey, E.A. 2001. Microsatellite variation in solitary and social tuco-tucos: molecular properties and population dynamics. Heredity 86:628-637
- Paul W. Sherman, Eileen A. Lacey, Hudson K. Reeve, Laurent Keller, (1995)"Forum: The eusociality continuum Behavioral Ecology," Volume 6, Issue 1, Spring 1995, Pages 102–108, https://doi.org/10.1093/beheco/6.1.102 (open access) According to Google Scholar, it has been cited 361 times.
