= Katherine Van Allen Grinnell =

American poet (1839–1917)

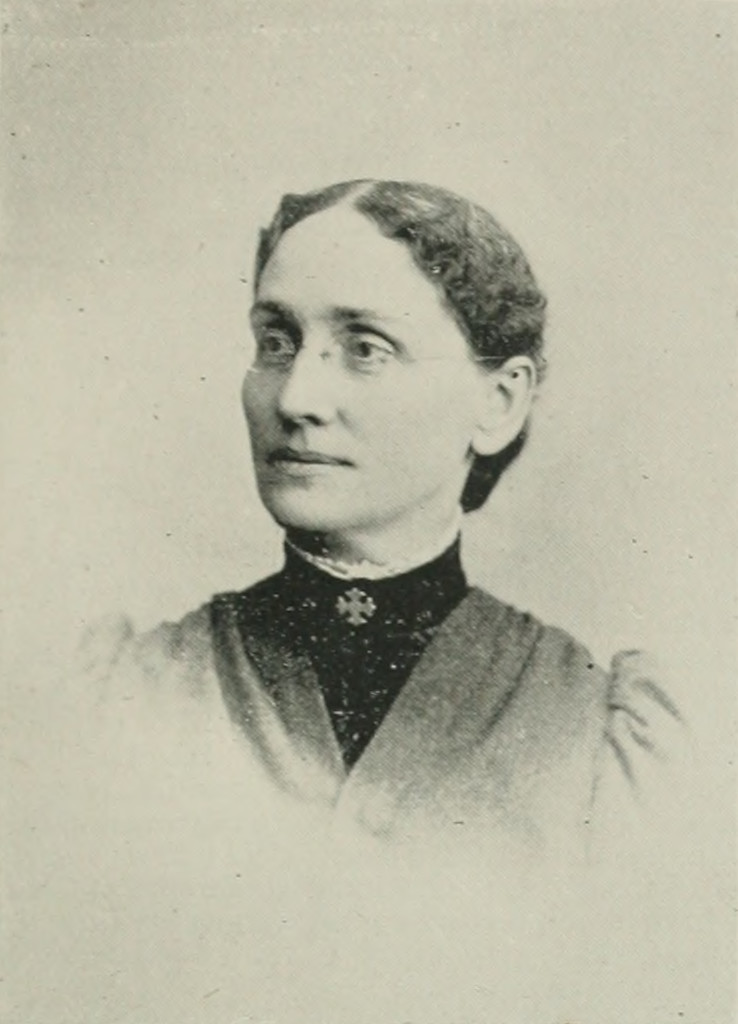
- Photo in A Woman of the Century
- Born: Katherine Van Allen; April 20, 1839; Pillar Point, Jefferson County, New York, U.S.
- Died: September 20, 1917 (aged 78); Garrett, Indiana
- Education: Falley Seminary
- Occupations: lecturer, author, social reformer
- Spouse: Graham G. Grinnell (m. 1865; died 1893)
- Children: 5
- Writing career
- Pen name: Adasha; Mrs. K. V. Grinnell
- Subject: women in government
- Notable works: Woman's place in government - from the scientific and Biblical viewpoint

Katherine Van Allen Grinnell (née, Van Allen; pen names, Adasha and Mrs. K. V. Grinnell; April 20, 1839 - September 20, 1917) was an American lecturer, author, and social reformer. She was one of the first women in the United States to lecture and write on the place of woman in the scheme of government. Grinnell attained an international reputation and was praised by Frances Willard, Susan B. Anthony, Lady Somerset, and others.

== Early life and education ==
Katherine Van Allen was born in Pillar Point, Jefferson County, New York, April 20, 1839. Her father was the owner of an estate near Sackets Harbor, New York. She had a sister, Florence.

About the time of her birth, a great religious revival swept over the country. Her parents came under its influence and joined the Methodist Episcopal Church. Their home thereafter was the home of the Methodist preacher and a center of active work for building up the interests of the town. At the age of fourteen years, she became a member of the church. At fifteen, she was sent to Falley Seminary. Her preceptress was Miss Rachel C. Newman, and the young student owed much to the influence of that woman.

== Career ==
On May 20, 1865, (Note: According to Willard & Livermore (1893), the marriage occurred in 1864.) she married Graham G. Grinnell, a deacon in the Presbyterian Church in Adams, New York, and united with that church, frankly asserting her inability to accept its doctrines as she understood them, engaging to acquaint herself with them, and to come into harmony with them, if possible. In 1871, just before the great fire, the family left Adams, New York, and removed to Chicago, Illinois. There were five children born to the couple, of which two reached adulthood, a son, William, and a daughter.

About 1879, after the children were born and Grinnell had reached the age of 40, she took up seriously spiritualistic study, began devoting her time to the propagation of her theories, and wrote much upon that subject, attaining prominence as a teacher and writer of the scientific principles of the social order. She advocated the social system based upon the scientific discoveries in Book of life; or, Spiritual, social, and physical constitution of man by Dr. Alesha Sivartha (1898, Stockton, Press of Leroy S. Atwood), Sivartha being one of several pen names used by Dr. Arthur Merton. Grinnell edited and published The Logos, a periodical devoted to the discoveries and doctrines of Sivartha. She was also the author of The Renaissance of Israel. Grinnell sometimes used the pen name, "Adasha". She often appeared in the pulpit with her son, William, a minister.

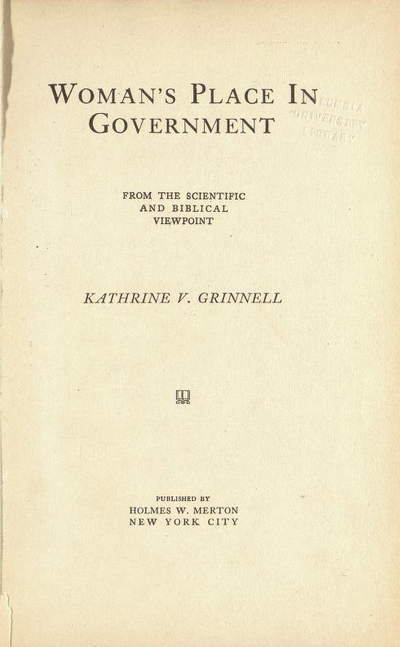
Woman's Place in Government

As the years passed, her spiritual life deepened and her sympathy with dogmatic teachings grew less. Active in public work, she believed that women should not compete with men in governmental affairs, but should co-operate with them. she advised the selection of a woman president to serve with a man and first advocated this when President Grover Cleveland was in the White House, saying Mrs. Cleveland should be the woman president. Grinnell was the author of a series of lectures which were given at the World's Columbian Exposition, at the Louisiana Purchase Exposition, and other places, including, Woman in an Ideal Government. In World's Congress of Representative Women (Chicago, 1893, Congress of Women). In 1914, she published Woman's place in government - from the scientific and Biblical viewpoint (New York City, H.W. Merton), which had a wide circulation.

She contributed poems to the periodical press.

== Personal life ==
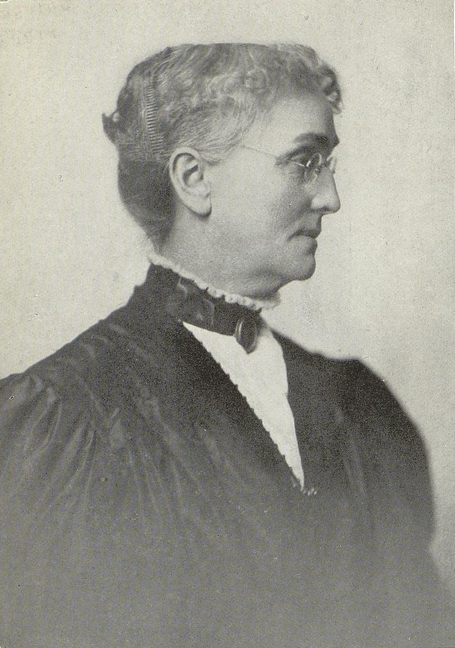
1914

By the early 1890s, the family was living in Mayfair, Cook County, Illinois. Mr. Grinnell, who was in business in Chicago, died there in 1893. Subsequently, Grinnell lived with her children. She came to Garrett, Indiana with her son, the Rev. William E. Grinnell, in October 1915, and remained until the summer of 1916, when she went to New York City, became ill, and never recovered. She returned to Garrett in July 1917 and later that month, had a stroke of paralysis. A second stroke occurred in August. She died in Garrett, September 20, 1917, at the home of her son, William. Interment was at Chicago's Union Ridge Cemetery.

== Selected works ==
- "Woman in an Ideal Government", 1893
- Renaissance of Israel; or, The coming order of society. Lectures (1907)
- Woman's place in government : from the scientific and Biblical viewpoint (1914)
