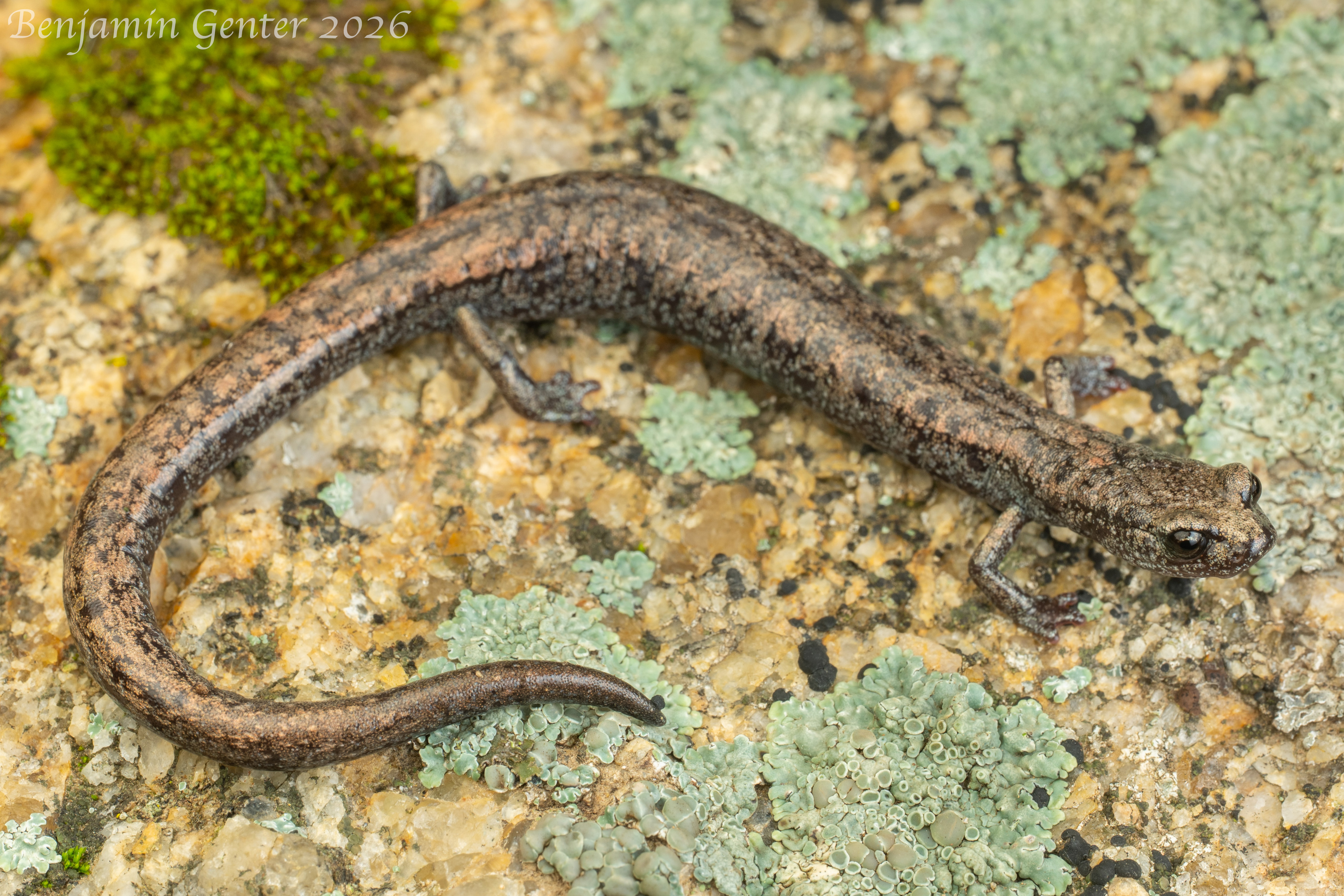
- Typical "woodland variant" individual from Caliente Creek drainage
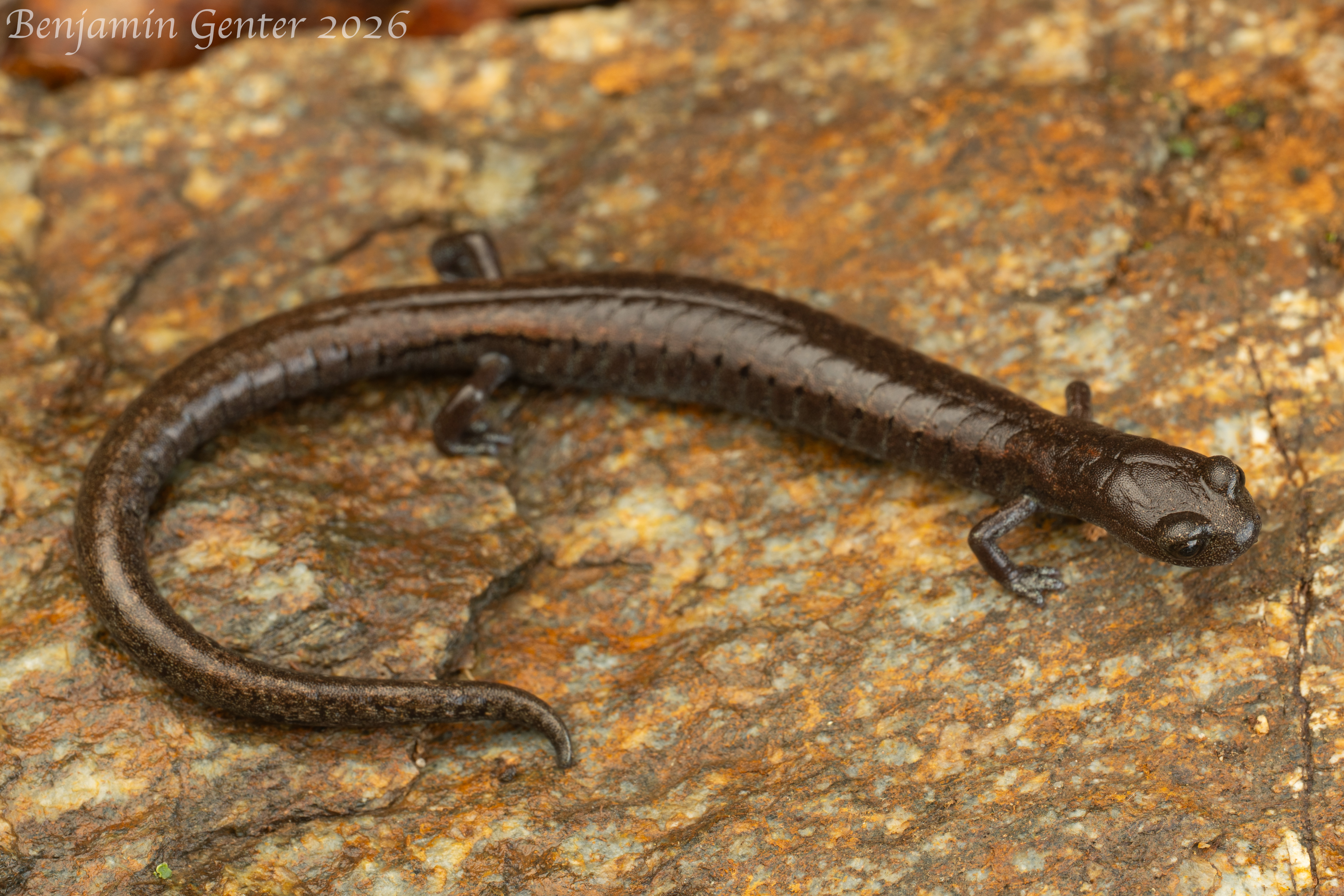
- Typical "woodland variant" individual from Tehachapi Mountains

Conservation status
- Endangered (IUCN 3.1)

Scientific classification
- Kingdom: Animalia
- Phylum: Chordata
- Class: Amphibia
- Order: Urodela
- Family: Plethodontidae
- Genus: Batrachoseps
- Species: B. stebbinsi

Binomial name
- Batrachoseps stebbinsi Brame & Murray, 1968
- Batrachoseps stebbinsi range map (2025), from the California Department of Fish and Wildlife

= Tehachapi slender salamander =

Species of amphibian

The Tehachapi slender salamander (Batrachoseps stebbinsi) is a species of plethodontid salamander, and one of the larger members of genus Batrachoseps. It is endemic to California, in Kern County in the western United States.

== Distribution ==
The Tehachapi slender salamander is closely related to the Kern Canyon slender salamander. It is considered a threatened species in California, and is found only in isolated areas of the Piute and Tehachapi Mountains of the Transverse Ranges in Southern California. Much of the salamander's habitat is currently located on land owned by Tejon Ranch.

== Description ==
This salamander is dark brown in color with light, glittery-looking speckles of coppery red and silver covering its 3-inch (76 mm) length. Like other plethodontids it lacks lungs and breathes through its skin, which it must keep moist. It lives in damp leaf litter and emerges during high humidity or rain.

== Conservation ==
The Tehachapi slender salamander is an IUCN Red List Endangered species.
