= Museum of Vertebrate Zoology =

Coordinates: 37°52′16″N 122°15′43″W

- Established: 1908; 118 years ago
- Location: Valley Life Sciences Building, UC Berkeley
- Type: Science museum
- Collection size: 640,000+ specimens
- Visitors: Research only
- Director: Michael Nachman
- Curators: Rauri Bowie (Birds), Jimmy A McGuire (Herpetology), Eileen Lacey (Mammals)
- Website: Official Website

The Museum of Vertebrate Zoology is a natural history museum at the University of California, Berkeley. The museum was founded by philanthropist Annie Montague Alexander in 1908. Alexander recommended zoologist Joseph Grinnell as museum director, a position he held until his death in 1939.

The museum became a center of authority for the study of vertebrate biology and evolution on the West Coast, comparable to other major natural history museums in the United States.

It has one of the nation's largest research collections of mammals, birds, amphibians and reptiles, and the largest collection of any university museum. The museum is located on the UC Berkeley campus, in the Valley Life Sciences Building, on the 3rd floor, entrance at room 3101.
