= Glen Everett Woolfenden =

American ornithologist

- Born: January 23, 1930; Elizabeth, New Jersey
- Died: June 19, 2007 (aged 77); Venus, Florida
- Education: Cornell University; University of Kansas; University of Florida
- Known for: The Florida Scrub Jay: Demography of a Cooperative-Breeding Bird (1984)
- Awards: Brewster Medal (1985); Margaret Morse Nice Medal (2001)
- Scientific career
- Workplaces: University of South Florida; Archbold Biological Station
- Thesis: Osteology of the waterfowl (1960)
- Doctoral advisor: Pierce Brodkorb

Glen Everett Woolfenden (1930–2007) was an American ornithologist, known for his long-term study of the Florida scrub jay (Aphelocoma coerulescens) population at Archbold Biological Station near Lake Placid, Florida. He established what became "the longest continuous population study of any avian species that does not nest in boxes."

== Biography ==
Born in Elizabeth, New Jersey, Woolfenden moved with his family at age 11 to Westfield, New Jersey and often went birding in what is now the Great Swamp National Wildlife Refuge. He attended Westfield High School for three years and then transferred for his final year to Peddie School, where he suffered a number of injuries as a member of the school's football team. He attended Cornell University, because of its famous Lab of Ornithology. He graduated in 1953 with a B.S. from Cornell University and in 1956 with an M.A. from the University of Kansas. In Kansas he worked, under the supervision of Harrison (Bud) Tordoff, on the comparative breeding behavior of Ammodramus sparrows. Woolfenden received his Ph.D. in 1960 from the University of Florida — by the time he was 30 years old he had prepared more than 2000 specimens. At the University of South Florida, he was from 1960 to 1961 an instructor, from 1961 to 1965 an assistant professor, from 1965 to 1970 an associate professor, from 1970 to 1988 a full professor, and from 1988 to 1999 a Distinguished Research Professor. He retired in 1999 but continued his field studies as a research associate and head of Archbold Biological Station's Ornithology Laboratory. All over the world, he gave invited lectures with locations including "Queensland, West Berlin, Oxford, Moscow, Tel-Aviv, Johannesburg, Tokyo, and Haines City".

Woolfenden supervised over 30 graduate students and influenced many undergraduate students. In 1972 John W. Fitzpatrick was an undergraduate summer intern at Archbold Biological Station. For the summer of 1972 and beyond, Woolfenden and Fitzpatrick immediately started collaborating on projects involving Florida scrub jays. After graduating in biology with a B.A. in 1974 from Harvard University and a Ph.D. in 1978 from Princeton University, Fitzpatrick became curator of birds at Chicago's Field Museum of Natural History. Fitzpatrick's position as museum curator gave him scheduling freedom to work in Florida with Woolfenden. The first of their many joint publications appeared in 1977. Their 406-page book The Florida Scrub Jay: Demography of a Cooperative-breeding Bird was published by Princeton University Press in 1984. In a letter to Jack P. Hailman, Ernst Mayr called the book “an instant classic.” In 1985 the American Ornithologists' Union made an award of the Brewster Medal jointly to Woolfenden and Fitzpatrick for their long-term study of Florida scrub jays.

In addition to his research using color-banding of Florida scrub jays, Woolfenden made many important contributions to ornithology in Florida. He was a charter member (in 1972) of the Florida Ornithological Society (FOS), served on the Society's board of directors for several terms, and was the Society's president from 1991 to 1992. He was appointed to the founding editorial board of FOS's journal Florida Field Naturalist and served as editor-in-chief of FOS's Special Publications from 1991 to 2004. Woolfenden and his wife, Janet A. Woolfenden, along with Robert W. Loftin, were the coauthors of a compilation entitled Florida Bird Records in American Birds and Audubon Field Notes (1947-1989): Species Index and County Gazetteer, which became FOS Special Publication No. 4 (1991). With other coauthors, Glen Woolfenden published FOS Special Publication Numbers 6 (in 1992) and 7 (in 2006). He also served on the Wilson Ornithological Society's editorial board and on the Cooper Ornithological Society's board of directors.

In March 1958, he married Gwendolyn. In 1981 he married Janet Adair Ezzelle (b. 1939). Upon his death he was survived by his widow, two daughters, a son, and three grandchildren.

== Selected publications ==
=== Books and monographs ===
- Woolfenden, G. E.; Rohwer, S. A. (1969). Breeding birds in a Florida suburb. Vol. 13. Gainesville, Florida: Bulletin of the Florida State Museum, Biological Sciences; 83 pages
- Bancroft, G. Thomas; Woolfenden, Glen E. (1982). "The Molt of Scrub Jays and Blue Jays in Florida". Ornithological Monographs (29): iii–vii, 1–51. doi:10.2307/40166767. JSTOR 40166767.
- Woolfenden, Glen Everett; Fitzpatrick, John W. (1984). The Florida Scrub Jay: Demography of a Cooperative-breeding Bird. Monographs in Population Biology, No. 20. Princeton University Press. ISBN 0-691-08367-3.
- Loftin, R. W.; Woolfenden, G. E.; Woolfenden, J. A. (1991). Florida bird records in American Birds and Audubon Field Notes (1947-1989): species index and county gazetteer. Special Publications No. 4. Gainesville, Florida: Florida Ornithological Society.
- Robertson Jr., William B.; Woolfenden, Glen E. (1992). Florida bird species: an annotated list. Special Publications No. 6. Gainesville, Florida: Florida Ornithological Society.
- Woolfenden, G. E.; Robertson Jr., W. B.; Cox, James (2006). The Breeding Birds of Florida. Part I: Sources and Post-Settlement Changes & Part II: Trends in Breeding Distributions Based on Florida's Breeding Bird Atlas Project. Special Publications No. 7. Gainesville, Florida: Florida Ornithological Society; pbk, 140 pages
