= Althea Sherman =

American ornithologist, artist and educator

Althea Rosina Sherman
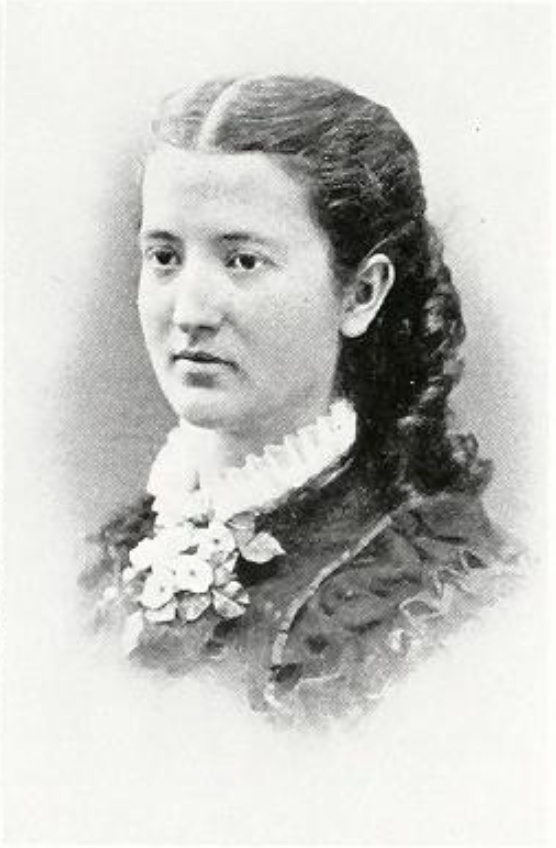
- Born: October 10, 1853; Farmersburg, Iowa
- Died: April 16, 1943 (aged 89); National, Iowa
- Resting place: National Cemetery, Clayton County
- Education: Upper Iowa University, Oberlin College, Art Institute of Chicago, Art Students League of New York
- Known for: leading authority on chimney swifts
- Scientific career
- Fields: Ornithology

Althea Rosina Sherman (1853 – 1943) was an American illustrator, educator, self-taught ornithologist, and writer who commissioned the building of the "Chimney Swifts' Tower" in Clayton County, Iowa. This structure enabled her to observe and report on the life cycle of chimney swifts, the first to complete such investigations. She published more than 70 articles in scientific and ornithological journals during her career. Sherman was elected as a member of the American Ornithologists' Union and was listed in the third edition of American Men of Science. Additionally, her work as an illustrator, particularly of the American goldfinch, inspired the Iowa General Assembly to adopt the American goldfinch as the Iowa state bird.

Because she was self-taught in her field of expertise, Sherman was an example of an autodidact.

== Early life and education ==
Sherman was born in Farmersburg Township, Clayton County, Iowa, to parents Mark Bachelor Sherman and Melissa Sherman (née Clark). She was the fourth of six children in the family. Her father was a self-taught leather tanner and shoe maker, working in New York State and then in Wisconsin. Once these trades were widely adapted by large factories, Mark Sherman became a farmer, making success of farm in Farmersburg Township, Iowa, which he acquired through a land grant after the Mexican-American War. Even though his daughter Althea Sherman later lamented in her writings about the decline of animal and plant life due to habitat loss from agricultural development, her father's farm income financed her education and supported her in her later life as she conducted ornithological research.

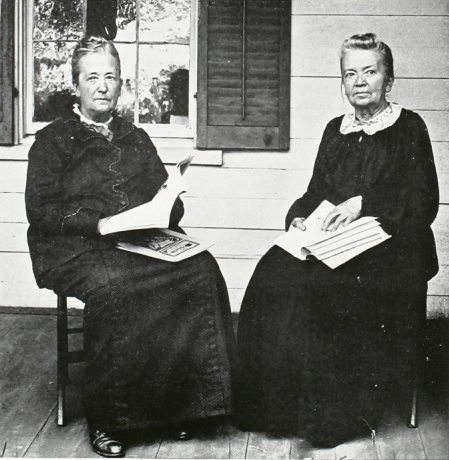
Althea Sherman (left) with her sister Dr. Amelia Sherman on the front porch of their family home, 1923.

Sherman and her two older sisters, Amelia Sherman and Ada Sherman, travelled 40 miles from home to attend a college preparatory academy at Upper Iowa University. All three sisters subsequently enrolled at Oberlin College. Sherman's sisters both pursued courses for a career in medicine, but Althea Sherman continued to pursue the study of art. At Oberlin College, Sherman pursued the classical course of art study, as opposed to the literary course of study. She later attributed a part of her scientific success to her studies of Greek, Latin, and the arts, especially illustration.

Following her graduation from Oberlin College in 1875 with a bachelor of arts in Fine Art, Sherman studied at the Art Institute of Chicago. She later returned to Oberlin College to complete a master's degree in art in 1882. Sherman later taught at Carleton College in Northfield, Minnesota, leaving in 1885 to study at the Art Students League of New York. In 1887, Sherman moved to Wichita, Kansas, to be closer to her older sister Ada. She later returned to her hometown in Iowa to care for her ailing parents.

In 1892, Sherman became a supervisor of drawing in the Tacoma Public Schools in Washington (state) until she returned to her hometown of National, Iowa, in 1895 to care again for her ailing father. Her father died in 1896 and Sherman remained to care for her mother until her mother's death in 1902. Sherman continued to reside at her Iowa family home with her older sister, Dr. Amelia Sherman.

== Scientific career ==
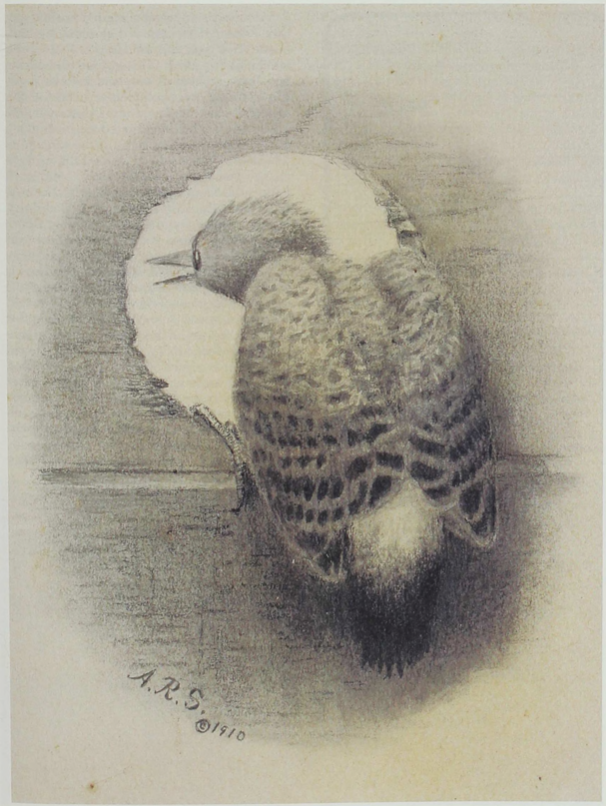
1910 Sketch of a Northern Flicker by Sherman

Following a 20-year career in the arts, Sherman then began her career ornithology, making use of her skills as an observer and illustrator. Prior to Sherman's time, biologists frequently sacrificed birds to examine them morphologically. Instead, Sherman pioneered the study of bird behavior, focusing on the observation of birds in their native habitats. Early in her investigations, she set up an observation facility near her home which she called her "Acre of Birds." There, Sherman included natural cavities in trees for nesting sites, as well as birdhouses, nesting platforms, and brush piles. Her birdhouses were constructed with holes for viewing the birds and for reaching in to evaluate the development of the nestlings. Sherman made observations about habitat requirements, feeding habits, and also the population growth and decline for various bird species. She measured egg incubation times and growth rates of baby birds for different species. Sherman frequently made sketches and illustrations of her observations and so was an avian portrait artist.

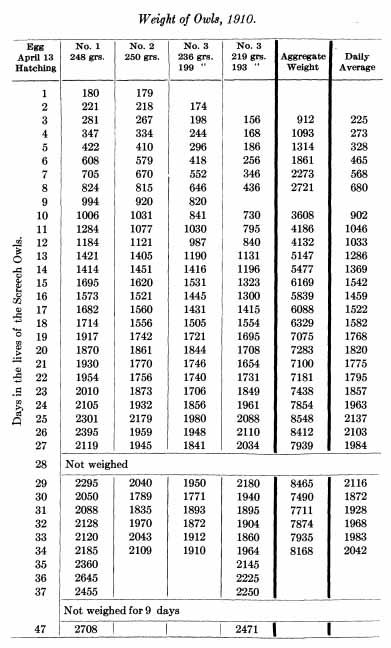
Sherman's Data on Growth Rates of Screech Owl Nestlings, as published in 1911

From her home in Iowa, Sherman followed the scholarly literature in ornithology and became a member of 15 scientific or ornithological societies. Sherman used her skills as an artist to illustrate her observations and studies, publishing over 70 articles on 38 species over her career that spanned three decades. Sherman published scholarly journal articles as early as 1911. Her articles were published in journals including: The Auk, the Audubon Society's Bird-Lore, the Journal of Mammalogy, The Wilson and the Avicultural Magazine. With Louis Agassiz Fuertes, in 1919 Sherman's bird illustrations were in the first American Ornithologists' Union's exhibit of bird paintings.

Sherman frequently hosted visitors to her "Acre of Birds". The visitors ranged from professional ornithologists to lay people who were simply interested in seeing the observation facilities that Sherman had crafted.

In 1914, Sherman traveled extensively in Europe, the Middle East, and Asia, to observe various bird species worldwide. She published her findings in a series of publications, entitled Birds by the Wayside. These publications resulted in an international reputation as an ornithologist.

At times, Sherman expressed judgement about bird behavior. The New York Times quoted Sherman after observing behavior of house wrens in which they invade and destroy the eggs of other birds. She felt that many people who were simply bird-lovers and not knowledgeable of bird behavior constructed wren boxes, thereby encouraging house wren population growth at the expense of other species. Sherman stated:

"There are people who deny that the earth is round, and there are other people who deny that the house wren is a bad bird."

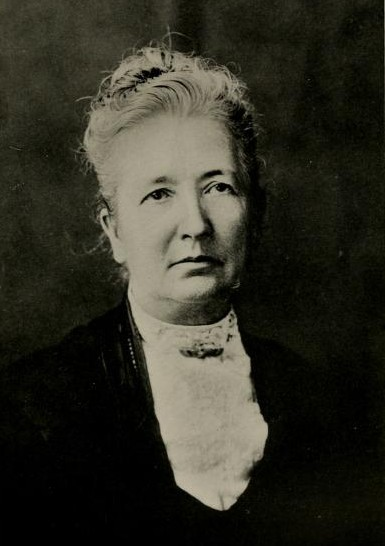
Photograph of Althea Sherman from History of Clayton County, Iowa (1916) by Realto E. Price.

Some ornithologists believed that Sherman was being inappropriately judgmental of house wrens. Many people provided bird boxes for house wrens to nest. Since these birds prey on other birds, Sherman contended the practice of providing bird boxes gave house wrens an unfair competitive advantage in the wild. This debate is sometimes known as "The Great Wren Debate" and has continued well into the 21st century.

Sherman's publications early in her career reported on observations of bird behavior, while later publications included more extensive interpretations. Over the course of her career, she served as a mentor for ornithologist Margaret Morse Nice, who was 30 years younger than Sherman. Sherman and Nice corresponded frequently, with Sherman at times offering advice and suggestions. She also mentored Oberlin College ornithologist Lynds Jones, with whom Sherman subsequently worked closely on The Wilson Bulletin.

As a self-taught ornithologist who mostly used a home-crafted outdoor observation facility for her investigations, Sherman mostly avoided the gender discrimination in scientific circles that was common at the time. Her scientific endeavors were self-financed, which also aided her overcoming gender discrimination.

=== Chimney Swifts' Tower ===
External media
- Media links for Althea Sherman

Images
- Photograph of a replica of Sherman's Chimney Swift Tower
- Portrait of Sherman in a garden, circa 1923 (Oberlin College archives)

Video
- History of the Althea Sherman Tower, as presented by Iowa PBS

In 1915, Althea commissioned the building of a 28-foot tall, 9-foot square wooden tower which was designed to attract nesting chimney swifts for observation. A staircase ran through the center with doors and peepholes so that Sherman could observe and document the life cycle of the chimney swift birds. Her observations were the first of their kind. Sherman collected 18 years of data using this tower.

== Honors and legacy ==
Sherman's research findings led to her being elected as a member of the American Ornithologists' Union in 1912, which at the time had only 100 members. She also was listed in the Who's Who of Women in Science and American Men of Science. She was an honorary member of The Wilson Club.

Sherman died at age 89 prior to her publication of a book summarizing her chimney swift data. However, Fred J. Pierce published Sherman's book Birds of an Iowa Dooryard posthumously, with publication limited to 1500 copies. Sherman's ornithological publications formed a part of ornithologist Arthur Cleveland Bent's treatise Life Histories of North American Birds.

The State Historical Society of Iowa has approximately 250 of Sherman's bird illustrations in addition to various of her writings. She left in her estate a financial endowment for Oberlin College, which included sufficient financial resources for the college to begin teaching ornithology courses.

The Chimney Swift tower fell into disrepair after Sherman's death. Eventually it was reconstructed and in the early 21st century was serving as a tourist attraction. The tower was re-located to Buchanan, Iowa, at the Bickett-Rate Memorial Preserve. Tower management was acquired by the Althea R. Sherman Project.

== Representative publications ==
- Sherman, Althea R. “The Nest Life of the Sparrow Hawk.” The Auk, vol. 30, no. 3, American Ornithological Society, 1913, pp. 406–18.
- Sherman, Althea R. “The Old Ornithology and the New.” The Wilson Bulletin, vol. 42, no. 1, Wilson Ornithological Society, 1930, pp. 3–10.
- Sherman, Althea R. “Birds by the Wayside, in Europe, Asia, and Africa.” The Wilson Bulletin, vol. 27, no. 1, 1915, pp. 243–71.
