= Ellen Ketterson =

American biologist

- Known for: Evolutionary Biology, Ecology, Ornithology
- Scientific career
- Workplaces: Indiana University

Ellen D. Ketterson is an American evolutionary biologist, behavioral ecologist, neuroendocrinologist and ornithologist best known for her experimental approach to the study of life-history trade-offs in a songbird, the Dark-eyed Junco. She is currently a Distinguished Professor of Biology, Director of the Environmental Resilience Institute, and affiliate professor in Cognitive Science, Gender Studies, Integrative Study of Animal Behavior, and Neuroscience at Indiana University.

== Education and career ==
Ketterson obtained all of her degrees from Indiana University Bloomington. She earned an A.B. in 1966 and an M.A. in 1968, both in Botany. She received her Ph.D. in 1974 in Zoology.

After receiving her doctoral degree, Ketterson was a postdoctoral scholar from 1974 to 1975 at Washington State University working with avian environmental physiologist James R. King. She was an assistant professor at Bowling Green State University from 1975 to 1977 before joining the faculty in the Department of Biology at Indiana University in 1977. Ketterson was appointed as a Distinguished Professor of Biology at Indiana University in 2006. She was also appointed as an affiliated faculty member of the Gender Studies department in 2003 and as a program faculty member of the Cognitive Science department in 2006 at Indiana University.

Ketterson co-founded the Center for the Integrative Study of Animal Behavior at Indiana University and served as the co-director from 1990 to 2002. Ketterson has been a senior research fellow at the Kinsey Institute for Research on Sex, Gender, and Reproduction at Indiana University since 2007. Since 2017, Ketterson has served as the director of the Environmental Resilience Institute at Indiana University, which aims to predict impacts of environmental change and develop solutions to prepare Indiana businesses, farmers, communities and individuals for those impacts.

In 2004, Ketterson received a Guggenheim fellowship to study plumage variation in junco species across North and Central America. Ketterson served as the president of the American Society of Naturalists in 2015. She has also won several major awards recognizing her career achievements in ornithology, including the American Ornithological Society Elliott Couse Award (1996), Wilson Ornithological Society Margaret Morse Nice Medal (awarded jointly with Val Nolan, Jr. in 1998), and the Alden Miller Award from the Cooper Ornithological Society (2014). She is also a Fellow of the American Academy of Arts and Sciences and the American Association for the Advancement of Science (AAAS).

== Research ==
Ketterson and her trainees, with her longtime collaborator and partner Val Nolan, Jr., have conducted long-term field studies combined with experimental manipulation of free-living dark-eyed juncos at the Mountain Lake Biological Station in Virginia since the 1970s. Early in her career, Ketterson focused on differential migration — specifically on a pattern of movement in which female birds migrate farther than males.

Ketterson developed the experimental approach of manipulating levels of the hormone testosterone in free-living birds and comparing behavior, physiology, and fitness to controls in order to study the evolution of life-history trade-offs. She coined the term "phenotypic engineering" to describe this approach. Ketterson's research showed that experimentally-elevated levels of testosterone increased male aggression, reduced parental care, and increased singing in males. In addition, males given exogenous testosterone were preferred by females in mate-choice tests. They also exhibited higher reproductive success as a result of extra-pair fertilizations despite the lower success of broods that they parent. However, she also found that testosterone-treated males had shorter life-spans and reduced immune-system function. Her research has provided a mechanistic understanding of the fitness consequences of how animals allocate time and energy to competing demands (i.e. reproduction versus survival).

Later, her work explored whether hormones, which affect multiple target-tissues simultaneously and mediate coordinated suites of traits, either constrain or potentiate adaptation. This work foreshadowed her interest in addressing limits to organisms' ability to respond to environmental change and the role of hormonally-mediated seasonal timing of behaviors (like reproduction, molt, and migration) in the generation and loss of biodiversity. As the director of the Environmental Resilience Institute, she leads a team of Indiana University researchers to prepare the Hoosier state for the effects of on-going environmental change.

The Ketterson research group currently conducts field research at a number of sites throughout the range of junco species, including in Indiana at Kent Farm on the Indiana University Research and Teaching Preserve, in the Appalachian Mountains in Virginia at the Mountain Lakes Biological Station, in California on the University of California, San Diego campus and at Laguna Mountain, in northwest Wyoming at Grand Teton National Park, in Idaho, in South Dakota, in Mexico, and in Guatemala.

The 2013 documentary-film project, 'Ordinary Extraordinary Junco: Remarkable Biology from a Backyard Bird' highlights years of research conducted by Ketterson and her colleagues.

== Personal life ==
Ketterson was married for 28 years to the ornithologist Val Nolan, Jr., her Ph.D. mentor and long-time collaborator, until his death in 2008.

== Awards and recognition ==
- Fellow of the American Ornithologists’ Union, elected 1988
- Member of International Ornithological Committee, elected 1990
- Fellow of the Animal Behavior Society, elected 1994
- American Ornithological Society Elliott Couse Award, 1996
- Wilson Ornithological Society Margaret Morse Nice Medal (awarded jointly to both her and Van Nolan, Jr.), 1998
- Animal Behavior Society Exemplar Award, 2003
- John Simon Guggenheim fellow, 2004
- Fellow of the American Association for the Advancement of Science (AAAS), elected 2009
- Fellow of the American Academy of Arts and Sciences, elected 2014
- Animal Behavior Society, Distinguished Animal Behaviorist Award, 2018

== Media ==
- Interviewed on Big Biology podcast in 2020

== Publications ==
- Kimmitt, A.A., Sinkiewicz, D.M., Ketterson E.D. (2020). Seasonally sympatric songbirds that differ in migratory strategy also differ in neuroendocrine measures. General and Comparative Endocrinology 285, 113250.
- Whittaker, D.J., Slowinski, S.P., Greenberg, J.P., Alian O., Winters A.D., Ahmad M.M., Burrell M.J.E., Soini H.A., Novotny M.V., Ketterson, E.D., Theis, K.R. (2019). Experimental evidence that symbiotic bacteria produce chemical cues in a songbird. Journal of Experimental Biology 222 (20), jeb202978.
- Kimmitt, A.A., Hardman, J.W., Stricker, C.A., Ketterson, E.D. (2019). Migratory strategy explains differences in timing of female reproductive development in seasonally sympatric songbirds. Functional Ecology 33 (9), 1651–1662.
- Reed, S.M., Ketterson, E.D. (2019). Breeding Latitude and Annual Cycle Timing in a Songbird. IU Journal of Undergraduate Research.
- Liebgold, E.B., Gerlach, N.M., Ketterson, E.D. (2019). Density‐dependent fitness, not dispersal movements, drives temporal variation in spatial genetic structure in dark‐eyed juncos (Junco hyemalis). Molecular Ecology 28 (5), 968–979.
- Singh, D., Reed, S.R., Kimmitt, A.A., Alford, K.A., Ketterson, E.D. (2019). Breeding at higher latitude as measured by stable isotope is associated with higher photoperiod threshold and delayed reproductive development in a songbird. bioRxiv, 789008.
- Reichard, D.G., Atwell, J.W., Pandit, M.M., Cardoso, G.C., Price, T.D., Ketterson, E.D. (2019). Urban birdsongs: higher minimum song frequency of an urban colonist persists in a common garden experiment. bioRxiv, 761734.
- Graham, J.L., Bauer, C.M., Heidinger, B.J., Ketterson, E.D., Greives, T.J. (2019) Early‐breeding females experience greater telomere loss. Molecular Ecology 28 (1), 114–126.
- Needham, K.B., Bergeon Burns, C., Graham, J.L., Bauer, C.M., Kittilson, J.D., Ketterson, E.D., Hahn, T., Greives, T.J., (2019). Changes in processes downstream of the hypothalamus are associated with seasonal follicle development in a songbird, the dark-eyed junco (Junco hyemalis). General and Comparative Endocrinology 270, 103–112.
