= Richard T. Holmes =

American ornithologist

Richard T. Holmes is an American ornithologist. He was the 2002 recipient of the Cooper Ornithological Society’s Loye and Alden Miller Research Award, which is given in recognition of lifetime achievement in ornithological research. He was also awarded the 2002 Margaret Morse Nice Medal by the Wilson Ornithological Society.

Holmes has authored a book called Hubbard Brook-The Story of a Forest Ecosystem with Gene E. Likens.
