= Gordon Orians =

American ornithologist

Gordon H. Orians
- Born: July 10, 1932 (age 94)
- Education: University of California, Berkeley
- Scientific career
- Fields: Ecology; Ornithology
- Thesis: The Ecology of Social Systems in the Red-winged Blackbird (Agelaius Phoeniceus) and the Tricolored Blackbird (A. Tricolor) (1960)
- Doctoral advisor: Frank Pitelka
- Doctoral students: Eric Charnov

Gordon Howell Orians (born July 10, 1932) is an American ornithologist and ecologist. He was the 1999 recipient of the Cooper Ornithological Society’s Loye and Alden Miller Research Award, which is given in recognition of lifetime achievement in ornithological research. He received the Eminent Ecologist Award from the Ecological Society of America in 1998.

He has been a foreign member of the Royal Netherlands Academy of Arts and Sciences since 1983 and a Fellow of the Ecological Society of America since 2012.
