= Josselyn Van Tyne =

American ornithologist and museum curator (1902–1957)

Josselyn Van Tyne (11 May 1902 – 30 January 1957) was an American ornithologist and museum curator of birds.

A son of the historian Claude H. Van Tyne, Josselyn Van Tyne received his A.B. from Harvard University in 1925 and his Ph.D. in 1928 from the University of Michigan at Ann Arbor. He became assistant curator of birds at the University of Michigan's Museum of Zoology and in 1931 curator of birds, a position he held until his death; his successor was Harrison B. Tordoff. In 1930 Van Tyne became an instructor in the University of Michigan's Department of Zoology, then assistant professor, associate professor, and finally professor in 1953.

... Most of his time was spent inside his office and the museum, but every year he aimed to get out at least once on an extended field trip. Over the years his travels carried him to Indo-China (the Kelley-Roosevelt expedition of 1928–1929), the Panama Canal Zone, Guatemala, British Honduras, Yucatan, the Bahamas, Canadian Arctic, Europe, the Chisos Mountains of Texas, and nearly every part of Michigan. He was a productive collector, and thousands of near-perfect bird skins, many of them preserved under difficult tropical conditions, give evidence of his skill as a preparator.

Van Tyne was editor of the Wilson Bulletin from 1939 to 1948 and the president of the Wilson Ornithological Society from 1935 to 1937. In 1936 he was elected a Fellow of the American Ornithologists' Union and served as the Union's president from 1950 to 1953.

In 1933 he married Helen Belfield Bates (1896–1980), a daughter of Henry Moore Bates.

== Selected works ==
- Life history of the toucan, Ramphastos brevicarinatus. 1929; 43 pages
- with Outram Bangs: Descriptions of five new Indo-Chinese birds. Field Museum of Natural History. 1930.
- with Outram Bangs: Bangs, Outram; Van Tyne, Josselyn (1931). Birds of the Kelley-Roosevelts Expedition to French Indo-China. doi:10.5962/bhl.title.3074.
- The Birds of Northern Petén, Guatemala. 1935; 46 pages
- ... The discovery of the nest of the Colima warbler (Vernivora crissalis). 1936.
- with George M. Sutton: The Birds of Brewster County, Texas. 1937.
- Check list of the birds of Michigan. 1938.
- with R. T. Hatt; L. C. Stuart; C. H. Pope; A. B. Grobman: "Chapter 6. The Birds (by J. Van Tyne)". Island life: a study of the land vertebrates of the islands of eastern Lake Michigan. No. 27. Cranbrook Institute of Science. 1948.
- with William Holland Drury, Jr.: The Birds of Southern Bylot Island: 1954. U. of Michigan Press. 1959; 37 pages (See Bylot Island.)
- with Dale A. Zimmerman: A Distributional Check-list of the Birds of Michigan. 1959.
- with Andrew J. Berger: Fundamentals of Ornithology. 1959; 624 pages

== See also ==
- Ornithologist Amelia Laskey, one of his scientific collaborators.
