= Robert Ricklefs =

American ornithologist (1943–2026)

Robert Eric Ricklefs
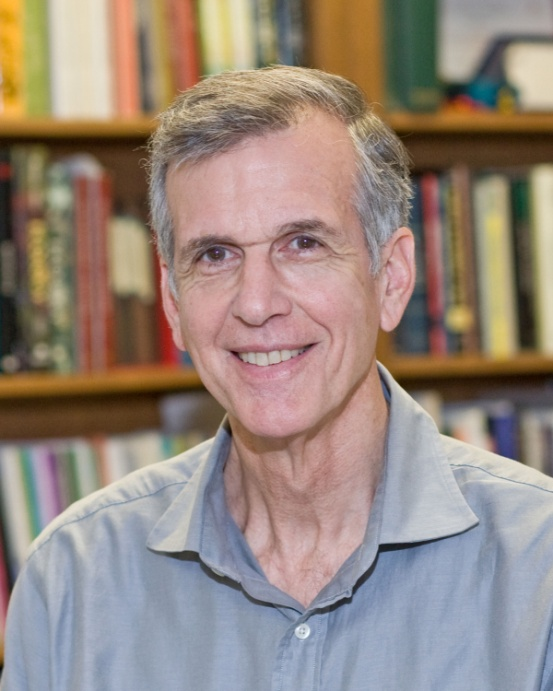
- Born: June 6, 1943
- Died: June 7, 2026 (aged 83)
- Education: University of Pennsylvania
- Awards: Sewall Wright Award (2005); National Academy of Sciences (2008); Ramon Margalef Prize in Ecology (2015)
- Scientific career
- Workplaces: University of Missouri, St. Louis; Stanford University
- Thesis: The Significance of Growth Patterns in Birds (1967)
- Website: www.umsl.edu/~ricklefsr/

Robert Eric Ricklefs (June 6, 1943 – June 7, 2026) was an American ornithologist and ecologist. He was the Curators' Professor of Biology at the University of Missouri, St. Louis from 1996 until August 2019.

== Early life and education ==
Born on June 6, 1943, he grew up near Monterey, California, where his interest in biology was fostered by a teacher. He graduated with a Bachelor of Science from Stanford University in 1963 and a Ph.D. from the University of Pennsylvania in 1967. His doctoral advisor was originally Robert H. MacArthur (prior to his move to Princeton University), but he finished his dissertation under W. John Smith. During his PhD, he studied avian growth and development, which he continued for much of his career. He completed a year as a postdoctoral fellow at the Smithsonian Tropical Research Institute in Panama before taking up a faculty position at the University of Pennsylvania. He was the 1982 recipient of the American Ornithologists' Union's William Brewster Memorial Award, the union's most prestigious award given annually for an exceptional body of work on birds of the Western Hemisphere. In 2003, he received the Pacific Seabird Group's Lifetime Achievement Award for his work on growth and development in seabirds. He was awarded the 2003 Margaret Morse Nice Medal by the Wilson Ornithological Society. He was the 2006 recipient of the Cooper Ornithological Society’s Loye and Alden Miller Research Award, which is given in recognition of lifetime achievement in ornithological research.

== Research ==
During his career, he has made major contributions to the island biogeography, including testing E. O. Wilson's Taxon Cycle Concept, His most-cited scientific paper examined ecological communities. Recent work has sought to rescale the concept of an ecological community. He has made major contributions to life-history theory of birds, avian growth and development, tropical ecology, and avian disease research. His original method for avian growth rate estimation continues to be used today though modifications have been proposed. His textbook Ecology, first published in 1973, continues to be updated and used in university courses. He has also published The Economy of Nature, Avian Growth and Development: Evolution Within the Altricial-precocial Spectrum and Aging, A Natural History.

== Career ==
- Assistant Professor, Department of Biology, University of Pennsylvania, 1968–1972
- Associate Professor, Department of Biology, University of Pennsylvania, 1972–1978
- Professor, Department of Biology, University of Pennsylvania, 1978–1995
- Curators’ Professor, Department of Biology, University of Missouri-St. Louis, 1995–2019

== Personal life and death ==
Ricklefs was married to the botanist Susanne Renner. He died on June 7, 2026, at the age of 83.

== Awards ==
- 1982: William Brewster Memorial Award, American Ornithologists' Union
- 2003: Lifetime Achievement Award, Pacific Seabird Group
- 2003: Margaret Morse Nice Medal, Wilson Ornithological Society
- 2005: Sewall Wright Award, American Society of Naturalists
- 2006: Love and Alden Miller Research Award, Cooper Ornithological Society
- 2009: Inducted member of the National Academy of Sciences April 28, 2009.
- 2010: Honorary doctorate from Aarhus University, Denmark
- 2010: Honorary doctorate from the University of Burgundy, France
- 2010: Honorary doctorate from the Catholic University of Louvain (Belgium)
- 2011: Alfred Wallace Award, The International Biogeography Society
- 2012: Fellow of the Ecological Society of America
- 2015: Ramon Margalef Prize in Ecology
- 2017: Honorary Lifetime Membership Award, American Society of Naturalists
- 2018: Honorary degree from the University of Chicago
