= Grand Colombier =

Uninhibited island in NW Atlantic Ocean

Coordinates: 46°49′13″N 56°10′10″W

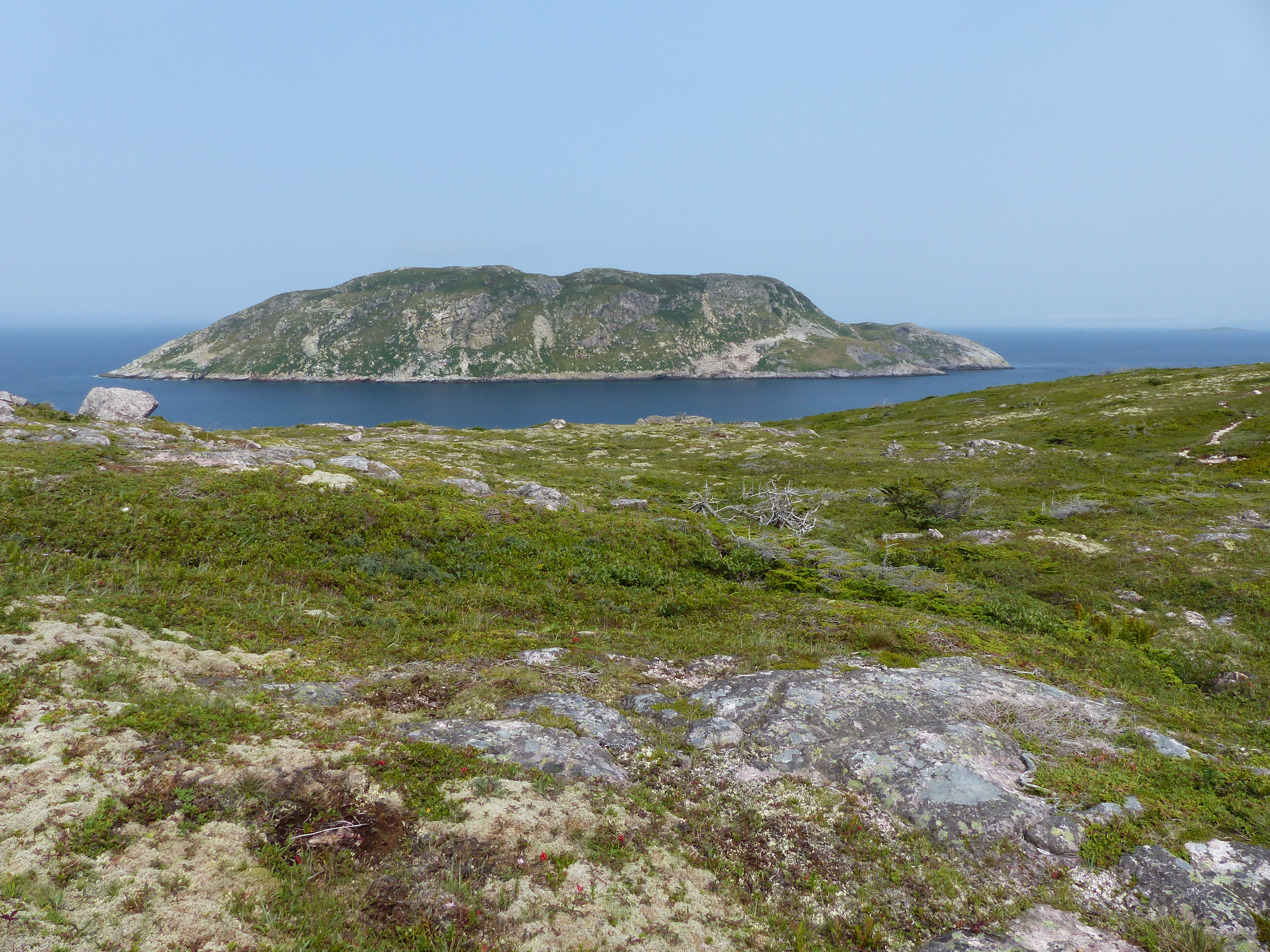
- Grand Colombier Island viewed from Saint-Pierre Island

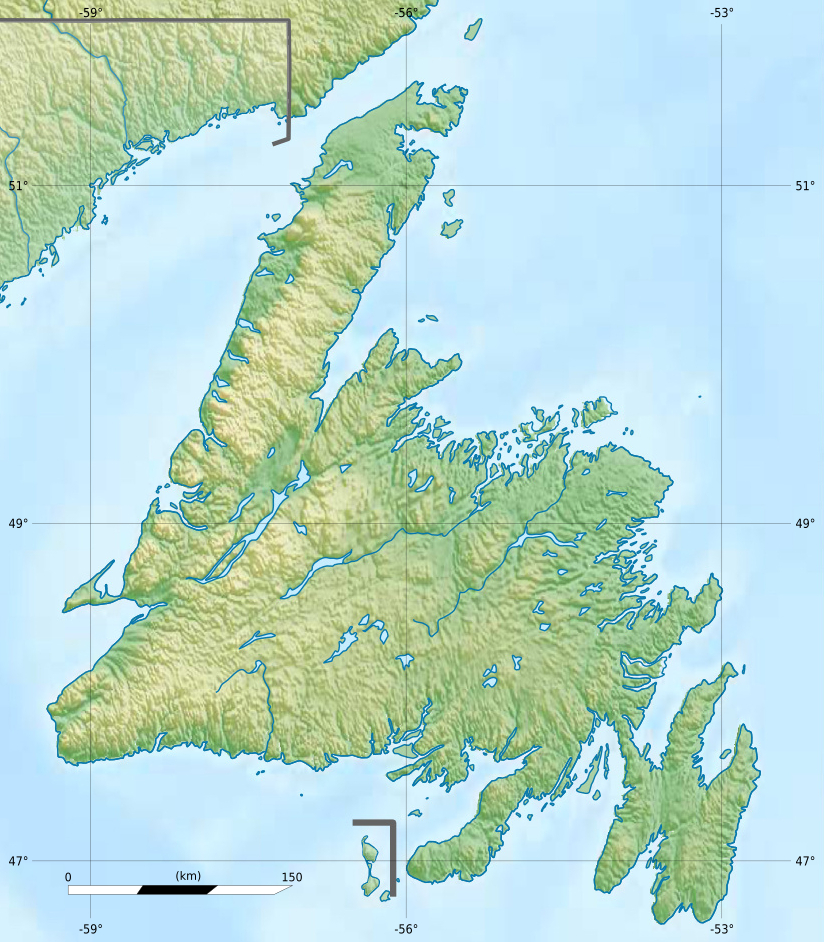
- Location within Newfoundland

Geography
- Archipelago: Saint Pierre and Miquelon
- Highest elevation: 150 m (490 ft)

Administration
- France

Demographics
- Population: 0

Grand Colombier is a small island in the French territory of Saint Pierre and Miquelon. The main type of vegetation on the island are ferns and graminoids. The island is a major breeding colony for birds, most predominantly the Leach's storm petrel, and was named due to its large bird population.

== Etymology ==
Grand Colombier has been noted for its large bird population since the 17th century and is named after the word colombier, a French term for a structure used to house pigeons or doves.

== Geography ==
Grand Colombier is one of the islands in the Saint Pierre and Miquelon archipelago and is 0.5 kilometres north of Saint Pierre Island. The island has a surface area of around 480,000 square metres. The island is a central plateau surrounded by slopes and cliffs. There is one pond on the island.

== Ecology ==
BirdLife International designated the island as an Important Bird Area.

There are no trees on the island. Ferns and graminoids are the main type of vegetation on the island and empetrum nigrum is also present. The eastern meadow vole is the only mammal on the island. Atlantic puffins and Leach's storm petrels use Grand Colombier for breeding.

The number of breeding pairs for the Atlantic Puffin rose from 400 in 1974, to over 1,000 in 2004, and between 7,000 and 12,000 in 2008. No common murre breeding pairs were reported before 2008, when at least three were estimated.

Petrels come to the island in May and lay their egg in June; these eggs hatch in July and fledge in September. Colonization of Saint Pierre and Miquelon after 1816 resulted in a decline of the petrel population. The breeding pair population of petrels on Grand Colombier was estimated to be around 178,000 in the 1980s, and 143,000 in 2004. A survey of the 2008 breeding season estimated that Grand Colombier had between 295,000 and 430,000 breeding pairs of petrel and was one of the largest petrel colonies in the northwestern Atlantic Ocean. The 2008 survey estimated that around 6% of the North Atlantic breeding population of petrels use Grand Colombier. A 2011 survey estimated that the breeding pair population was around 146,000. The petrel carrying capacity on Grand Colombier is esimated to be around 1.29 million breeding pairs.

== See also ==
- Geography of Saint Pierre and Miquelon
- List of Saint Pierre and Miquelon-related topics
- Miquelon Island (Northeast Coast) Important Bird Area

== Works cited ==
=== Journals ===
- Birks, John, ed. (2020). "Linking 19th century European settlement to the disruption of a seabird's natural population dynamics". Proceedings of the National Academy of Sciences of the United States of America. 117 (51). National Academy of Sciences: 1–9. doi:10.2307/27005818. JSTOR 27005818.
- Lormée, Herve; Delord, Karine; Letournel, Bruno; Barbraud, Christophe (2012). "Population Survey of Leach's Storm-Petrels Breeding At Grand Colombier Island, Saint-Pierre and Miquelon Archipelago". The Wilson Journal of Ornithology. 124 (2). Wilson Ornithological Society: 245–252. doi:10.2307/41480739. JSTOR 41480739.

=== Web ===
- "Grand Colombier Island (NF036)". BirdLife International. Archived from the original on 6 May 2026.
