= Russell Balda =

American ornithologist

Dr Russell P. Balda is an American ornithologist notable for his studies of the behavioral ecology of the pinyon jay as well as for his work on spatial cognition in seed-caching birds. He was the 1998 recipient of the Cooper Ornithological Society’s Loye and Alden Miller Research Award, which is given in recognition of lifetime achievement in ornithological research.
