= William Dawson (ornithologist) =

American ornithologist, zoologist, and professor (1927–2020)

William Ryan Dawson (24 August 1927 – 8 March 2020) was an American zoologist and ornithologist and emeritus professor of zoology at the University of Michigan. He is known in the field of ornithology for his comparative studies on desert and closely related non-desert birds in the south-western United States, Mexico and Australia.

== Early life and education ==
He was born in Los Angeles and graduated from the University of California at Los Angeles in 1949, was awarded Master of Arts in 1950 and a Ph.D. in 1953. He was later awarded Doctor of Science by the University of Western Australia in 1971.

== Career ==
He joined the faculty of zoology at the University of Michigan, Ann Arbor, where he worked from 1953 to 1994, being appointed professor in 1962 and D.E.S. Brown Professor of Biological Science in 1981. He was also director of the Museum of Zoology at the university from 1982 to 1993. He was emeritus professor at Michigan from 1994 onwards.

He was awarded a Guggenheim Fellowship in 1963. He took part in a number of expeditions, including the R/V Alpha Helix New Guinea Expedition in 1969, the R/V Dolphin Gulf of California Expedition in 1976 and the R/V Alpha Helix Galapagos Expedition of 1978.

As a keen ornithologist he was a member of the American Ornithological Union and the Cooper Ornithological Society. He was the 1996 recipient of the Cooper Ornithological Society’s Loye and Alden Miller Research Award, which is given in recognition of lifetime achievement in ornithological research.
