= Edward H. Burtt Jr. =

American ornithologist, writer, and educator

Edward "Jed" Howland Burtt Jr.
- Born: April 22, 1948; Waltham, Massachusetts
- Died: April 27, 2016 (aged 68)
- Occupations: Ornithologist, author
- Writing career
- Subject: Ornithology
- Notable work: Alexander Wilson: The Scot Who Founded American Ornithology

Edward "Jed" Howland Burtt Jr. (April 22, 1948 – April 27, 2016) was an American ornithologist, writer, and educator, and was responsible for many discoveries in ornithology.

== Background ==
Burtt was born in Waltham, Massachusetts to Edward H., an insurance salesman, and Barbara Burtt (née Pride), a schoolteacher. He began watching birds at the early age of six, which inspired him to pursue a career in ornithology. As a child, he enjoyed observing the behavior of birds, and visited various birdwatching hotspots around Massachusetts such as Parker River National Wildlife Refuge.

== Career ==
Jed Burtt obtained a bachelor's degree from Bowdoin College in 1970, and shortly thereafter attended graduate school. In 1977, he obtained his PhD from the University of Wisconsin with Jack P. Hailman, where he studied the evolution of color in wood-warblers (Parulidae). During his final year of graduate school he had a one-year term at University of Tennessee as a visiting instructor. Following this, in 1977, he joined the zoology department at Ohio Wesleyan University, and remained there until 2014.

Burtt is known among ornithologists worldwide as a leader in the study of evolution of avian color. He has published extensively on the coloration of wood-warblers, the evolutionary pressure of bacteria on the coloration of feathers, sunlight as a selection pressure on the coloration of bills, among many other works.

Burtt has been president of multiple ornithological organizations, including the American Ornithologists' Union and the Wilson Ornithological Society.

== Honors ==
Throughout his successful career, Burtt has involved undergraduates heavily in his research. To recognize this rare accomplishment, in 2015 the Wilson Ornithological Society established the Jed Burtt Mentoring Grants, which funds research and travel to meetings for professor and undergraduate teams. In addition, the Carnegie Foundation for the Advancement of Education and the Council for the Advancement and Support of Education named Burtt as Ohio Professor of the Year in 2011.

In 2013, the Wilson Ornithological Society recognized Burtt's dedication to ornithology with the society's most prestigious award, the Margaret Morse Nice Medal.

== Publications ==
- Burtt, E. H. Jr. 1986. An analysis of physical, physiological and optical aspects of avian coloration with emphasis on Wood Warblers. Ornithol. Monogr. 38: x + 126 p.
- Burtt, E. H. Jr., M. R. Schroeder*, L. M. Smith*, J. E. Sroka, K. J. McGraw. 2011. Colourful parrot feathers resist bacterial degradation. Biol. Letters 7: 214–216 (doi: 10.1098/rsbl.2010.0716).
- Burtt, E.H. Jr. and J.M. Ichida. 1999. Occurrence of feather-degrading bacilli in the plumage of birds. Auk 116: 364–372.
- Burtt, E.H. Jr. and J.M. Ichida. 2004. Gloger's Rule, feather-degrading bacteria, and color variation among Song Sparrows. Condor 106: 681–686.
- Goldstein, G., K. Flory*, B.A. Browne*, S. Majid*, J.M. Ichida, and E.H. Burtt Jr. 2004. Bacterial degradation of black and white feathers. Auk 121: 656–659.
- Muza*, M.M., E.H. Burtt Jr., and J.M. Ichida. 2000. Distribution of bacteria on the feathers of eastern North American birds. Wilson Bull. 112: 432–435.
- Reneerkins, J., M.A. Versteegh†, A.M. Schneider*, T. Piersma, and E.H. Burtt Jr. 2008. Seasonally changing preen wax composition: Red Knots flexible defense against feather-degrading bacteria. Auk 125: 285–290.
- Ruiz-de-Castañeda†, R., E.H. Burtt Jr., S. González-Braojos and J. Moreno. 2012. Bacterial degradability of an intrafeather unmelanized ornament: a role for feather-degrading bacteria in sexual selection? Biol. J. Linn. Soc. 105: 409–419.
- Saranathan*, V. and E.H. Burtt Jr. 2007. Sunlight on feathers inhibits feather-degrading bacteria. Wilson J. Ornithol. 119: 239–245.
- Schreiber, R. W., E. A. Schreiber, A. M. Peele*, and E. H. Burtt Jr. 2006. Pattern of damage to albino Great Frigatebird flight feathers supports hypothesis of abrasion by airborne particles. Condor 108: 736–741.

== See also ==
- Ludlow Griscom Award
