= George A. Bartholomew =

American biologist

- Born: June 1, 1919; Independence, Missouri, U.S.
- Died: October 2, 2006 (aged 87)
- Awards: Guggenheim Fellowship for Natural Sciences, US & Canada
- Scientific career
- Workplaces: University of California, Los Angeles

George Adelbert "Bart" Bartholomew (June 1, 1919 – October 2, 2006) was an American biologist. He was born in Independence, Missouri and earned his B.A. and M.A. degrees from the University of California, Berkeley. During the Second World War he served as a physicist in the U.S. Naval Bureau of Ordnance. He earned his PhD at Harvard University, but was associated during the rest of his long career, until his retirement in 1989, with the University of California, Los Angeles (UCLA).

Bartholomew was elected a Fellow of the American Academy of Arts and Sciences in 1981 and a member of the National Academy of Sciences in 1985. Bartholomew was the inaugural (1993) recipient of the Cooper Ornithological Society’s Loye and Alden Miller Research Award, which is given in recognition of lifetime achievement in ornithological research.

Bartholomew is also recognized for the large number of prolific scientists that trained under his supervision. Specifically, 39 Ph.D. students, 5 postdoctoral researchers, and one Master’s student were trained in his lab at UCLA. These students went on to train their own students, and as of 2005 his lineage spanned a maximum of seven generations and included nearly 1,200 individuals. Bartholomew is so well respected among contemporary biologists that it is a source of pride to claim to be in the "Bartholomew Tree", which is to be an academic descendant of Bartholomew.
