= Loye and Alden Miller Research Award =

The Loye and Alden Miller Research Award, now known as the AOS Miller Award, was established in 1993 by the Cooper Ornithological Society (COS) to recognize lifetime achievement in ornithological research. The namesakes were Loye H. Miller and his son Alden H. Miller, both of whom focused largely on ornithology.

Since the merger of the Cooper Ornithological Society with the American Ornithologists' Union to form the American Ornithological Society in 2016 the award has been presented by the latter.

== Recipients of the award ==
Source: American Ornithological Society

Cooper Ornithological Society

- 1993 – George Bartholomew
- 1994 – Storrs Olson
- 1995 – Barbara De Wolfe
- 1996 – William Dawson
- 1997 – Robert Storer
- 1998 – Russell Balda
- 1999 – Gordon Orians
- 2000 – Ernst Mayr
- 2001 – Frank Pitelka
- 2002 – Richard Holmes
- 2003 – Peter and Rosemary Grant
- 2004 – Alexander Skutch
- 2005 – John Wiens
- 2006 – Robert Ricklefs
- 2007 – Robert Payne
- 2008 – Peter Marler
- 2009 – Frances James
- 2010 – Keith A. Hobson
- 2011 – Susan Haig
- 2012 – Thomas Martin
- 2013 – Trevor Price
- 2014 – Ellen Ketterson
- 2015 – Jerram Brown
- 2016 – Walter D. Koenig

American Ornithological Society

- 2017 – Carol Vleck
- 2018 – Janis Dickinson
- 2019 – A. Townsend Peterson
- 2020 – Erica Nol
- 2021 – Tony D. Williams
- 2022 – John Wingfield
- 2023 – Vicki Friesen
- 2024 – no award
- 2025 – Scott K. Robinson

== See also ==
- List of ornithology awards
