= Harrison B. Tordoff =

American ornithologist and conservationist (1923–2008)

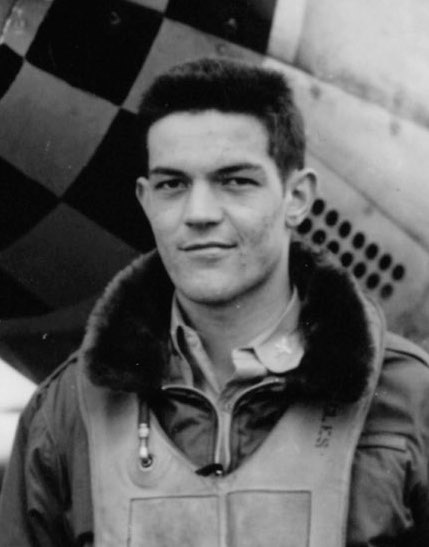
- Tordoff as a pilot during World War II
- Born: February 8, 1923; Mechanicville, New York
- Died: July 23, 2008 (aged 85); St. Paul, Minnesota
- Other name: "Bud"
- Citizenship: American
- Education: Cornell University (B.A.); University of Michigan (Ph.D.)
- Spouse: Jean Tordoff
- Children: 3
- Scientific career
- Fields: Ornithology
- Workplaces: University of Kansas; University of Michigan; University of Minnesota
- Thesis: Systematic Study of the Avian Family Fringillidae, Based on the Structure of the Skull (1950)
- Doctoral advisor: Josselyn Van Tyne
- Doctoral students: Frank Gill
- Military career
- Branch: United States Army Air Forces
- Service years: 1942–45
- Rank: Captain
- Unit: 352nd Fighter Squadron
- Conflicts: World War II: European Theater
- Awards: Distinguished Flying Cross

Harrison Bruce "Bud" Tordoff (February 8, 1923 – July 23, 2008) was an American ornithologist and conservationist. He was brought up in Mechanicville in upstate New York, hunting and fishing, and became interested in wildlife management and zoology. He studied as an undergraduate at Cornell University, returning to complete his degree after a period of military service during World War II. He had served as a fighter pilot in the United States Army Air Forces, and his five confirmed aerial victories qualified him as a fighter ace.

Tordoff completed his doctoral degree in ornithology at the University of Michigan. During his professional career, he worked as a faculty member and natural history museum curator at a number of public universities. Much of his career was spent at the University of Minnesota, where he served as director of the Bell Museum of Natural History from 1970 to 1983. He was active in ornithological and conservation organisations, and from 1978 to 1980 was president of the American Ornithologists' Union. Most of Tordoff's research was on the evolution of finches, and he is most remembered for his role in the reintroduction of the peregrine falcon in the upper Mississippi valley.

== Early life and education ==
Tordoff was born in Mechanicville, New York on February 8, 1923, the youngest and the only son among the six children of Harry and Ethel Tordoff. With his father, a stonemason, he learned to hunt and fish, and spent much of his free time observing birds and other wildlife, afield with his dog. He raised ring-necked pheasants for release, and started studying wildlife management, which he expected to be his career. He later said that shooting a black-throated blue warbler and admiring its unusual plumage sparked an interest in ornithology.

In 1940, Tordoff enrolled at Cornell University, where he found that his interest in the natural world could be pursued in a formal setting. While he was there, he met Robert M. Mengel (his lifelong best friend, later editor of the Auk), who encouraged his interest in ornithology, as did one of his professors, Arthur Augustus Allen. His studies were interrupted by his military service during World War II, although he managed to complete some courses while in the military. After the war, Tordoff resumed his studies and in 1946 he graduated with a B.A. degree in zoology. In graduate school at the University of Michigan from 1947 to 1950 he studied ornithology under Josselyn Van Tyne and George Miksch Sutton, earning a Ph.D. with a thesis on the systematics of finches.

== Military service ==
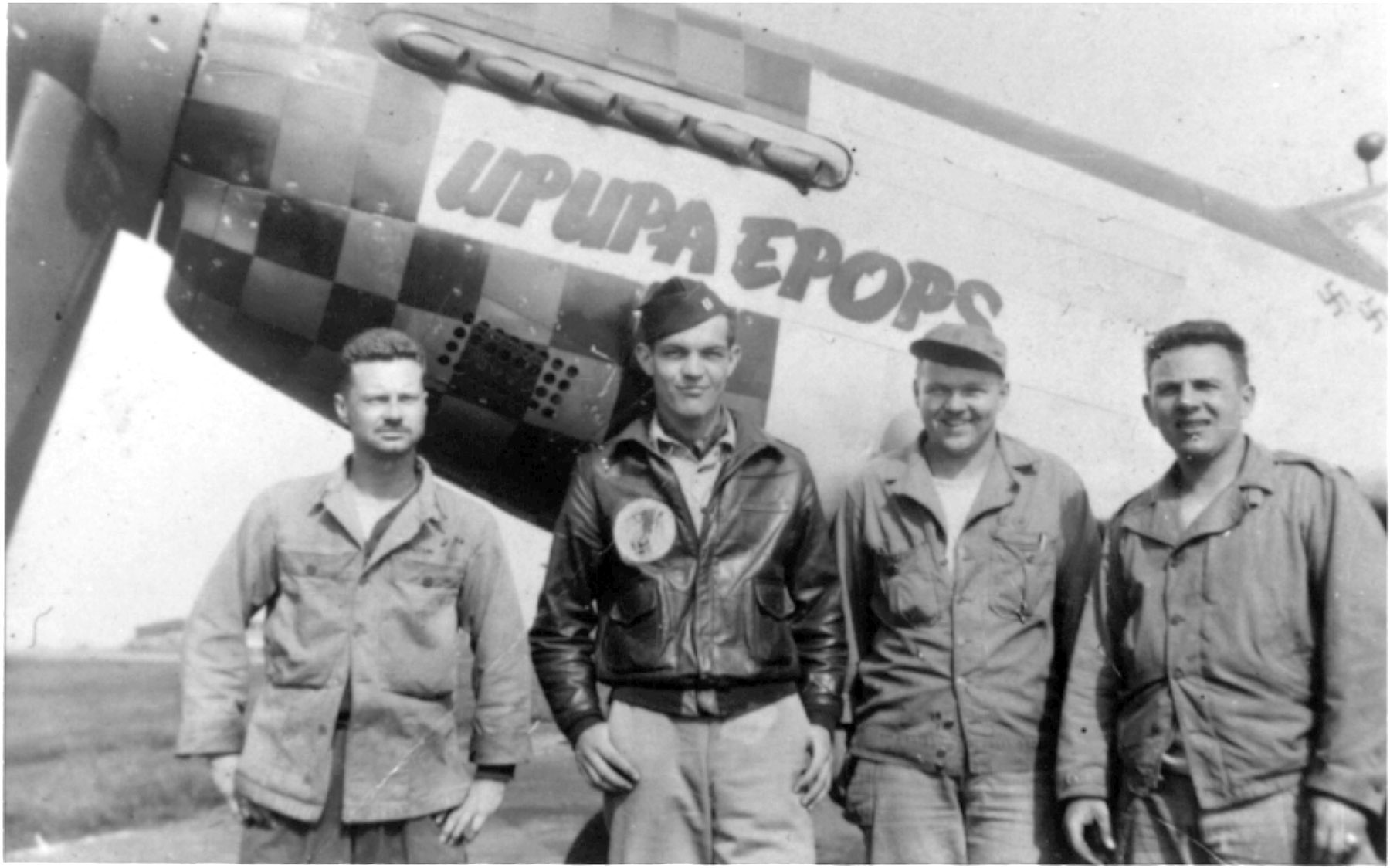
Tordoff (second from left) with ground crew in front of his P-51, Upupa Epops

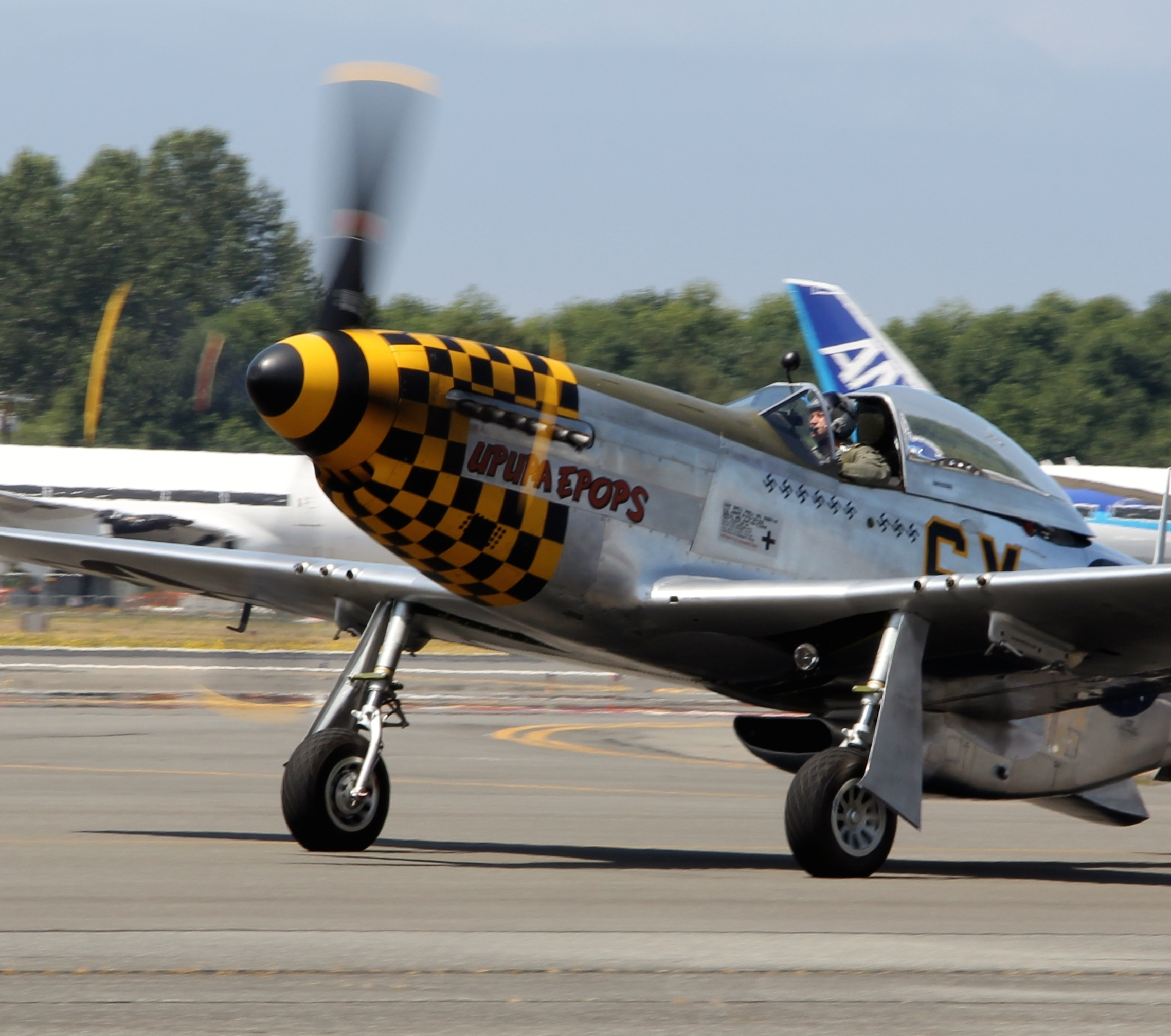
Tordoff's restored P-51 in 2013

In 1942, Tordoff enlisted in the U.S. Army Air Forces, and trained as a fighter pilot. He later recounted that he naively imagined flying as thrilling, and a way to avoid ground combat. His depth perception was low by Air Force standards, so he passed his vision test by watching another pilot candidate get tested, and figuring out how the settings worked on the apparatus that was used. In 1943 he earned his wings, and joined the 352nd Fighter Squadron, 353rd Fighter Group, 8th Air Force. He flew a total of 85 missions during the war, in support of the Allied bombing of Germany, and reached the rank of captain.

During his first missions, flown in a P-47 Thunderbolt he named Anne, he showed himself to have some ability and downed three Bf 109 fighters, two during the first mission in which he engaged in combat. Returning in March 1945 after a period of leave, he was assigned a new P-51D Mustang. At the time aircraft names were under heavy scrutiny due to Nazi propaganda over an American bomber named Murder Inc. He named the plane after the scientific name of the hoopoe—Upupa epops—for the name's "silliness". In the P-51, he shot down two more German aircraft—including one chance strike at a Me 262 jet fighter from long distance—and those five victories qualified him as a fighter ace. Upupa Epops is now restored as close as possible to its World War II condition, as part of the Flying Heritage Collection.

== Scientific career ==
From 1950 to 1957, Tordoff was a faculty member at the University of Kansas and a researcher at Kansas' Natural History Museum. While at Kansas, he collaborated with a number of other ornithologists, including Mengel, Glen Woolfenden, and Norman A. Ford; together, they are said to have raised standards for ornithological museum work. Tordoff edited The Wilson Bulletin, the journal of the Wilson Ornithological Society, from 1952 to 1954. During that time, he convinced a local printer, Ayle Allen, to print the journal, and their collaboration eventually grew into Allen Press, a prominent publisher of scientific journals and books. In 1957 Tordoff moved his family back to Ann Arbor where he replaced Van Tyne as a faculty member at the University of Michigan, becoming curator of birds at the Museum of Zoology. There he advised a number of graduate students who went on to have distinguished careers, among them Frank Gill.

In 1970, he was hired by the University of Minnesota, as a professor and director of the Bell Museum of Natural History. He headed the Bell Museum until 1983, and retired from the university in 1991. During his time at Minnesota, he helped build the new Department of Ecology, Evolution and Behavior, and raised a large endowment for graduate work in the biological sciences. Recognized as an expert on running natural history museums, in 1978 he was hired to advise the University of Oklahoma on turning around the Sam Noble Oklahoma Museum of Natural History. He was a member of the American Ornithologists' Union and served as its president from 1978 to 1980. He also helped start and raise funds for the Birds of North America encyclopedia project.

Tordoff's own research was largely on the systematics of cardueline finches such as crossbills, continuing from his doctoral thesis. Tordoff also collaborated with Alan Feduccia on the feather anatomy of Archaeopteryx.

== Conservation work ==
While at the University of Michigan, Tordoff worked with Harold Ford Mayfield and the Michigan Audubon Society to protect the rare Kirtland's warbler. From 1975 to 1977, he was the first chair of the Minnesota chapter of the Nature Conservancy. Together with Carrol Henderson, he developed the non-game wildlife program at the Minnesota Department of Natural Resources. As a conservationist, Tordoff was known for his ability to engage a wide public audience, including birders and sportsmen as well as academics.

Tordoff was especially passionate about peregrine falcons. He said this was because of his experience as a pilot, and that "his fighter was as close as a human could get to being a peregrine". Pat Redig, one of his collaborators and the founder of the Raptor Center in St. Paul, called Tordoff the "heart and soul" of the peregrine restoration effort. When he started his work, there were almost no breeding peregrines in the eastern United States, and the species was listed under the Endangered Species Act. As part of his work to reestablish peregrines, Tordoff raised funds for the Midwest Peregrine Restoration Project, and ringed hundreds of nestlings. As part of this project, 1286 peregrine chicks were hatched and by 2008 Tordoff and his colleagues had established a population of 128 breeding pairs and growing in the upper Mississippi region. A key part of their success arose from his idea to put peregrine nests on the top of skyscrapers in cities like Minneapolis. This not only increased the availability of nesting sites, but also drew the public's attention, since peregrines could be seen in cities and later on captured via webcams. Season after season, he tracked the success of peregrine falcons and created a large database to analyze the statistics of the growing population. During his retirement, he devoted much of his time to peregrine falcon work.

== Personal life ==
In 1946, he married Jean Van Nostrand, and they had three children, Jeffrey (died 2015), Judith (died 1970), and James. Tordoff continued his childhood pastimes of hunting and fishing throughout his life. He kept hunting dogs, especially English Setters, his companions whenever possible. In July 2008, Tordoff died at St. Joseph's Hospital in St. Paul at the age of 85, from the effects of Alzheimer's disease.

== Aerial victory credits ==
Date	#	Type	Location	Aircraft flown	Unit Assigned
August 4, 1944	2	Messerschmitt Bf 109	Bremen, Germany	P-47 Thunderbolt	352 FS, 353 FG
September 27, 1944	1	Bf 109	Hanau, Germany	P-47	352 FS, 353 FG
March 31, 1945	1	Messerschmitt Me 262	Dessau, Germany	P-51 Mustang	352 FS, 353 FG
April 7, 1945	1	Bf 109	Hamburg, Germany	P-51	352 FS, 353 FG

SOURCES: Air Force Historical Study 85: USAF Credits for the Destruction of Enemy Aircraft, World War II
