= John Wiens =

John A. Wiens is an American ecologist. His research has focused on birds and insects in semiarid environments on several continents, emphasizing community ecology and spatial relationships. He is a pioneer in the field of landscape ecology (encompassing geographic and land-use patterns in the study of ecosystems). John Wiens was the 2005 recipient of the Cooper Ornithological Society’s Loye and Alden Miller Research Award, which is given in recognition of lifetime achievement in ornithological research. He was Chief Conservation Science Officer at PRBO Conservation Science from 2008 - 2012.
