= Robert W. Storer =

American ornithologist (1914–2008)

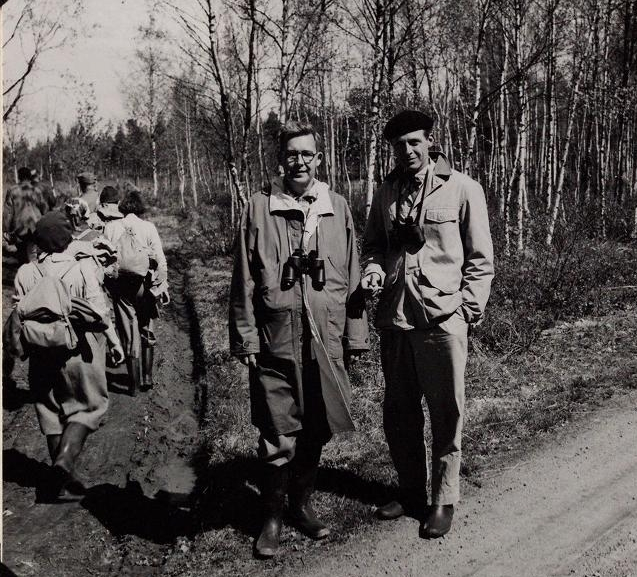
Robert W. Storer with George Merck at Pekori, Finland 14 June 1958

Robert Winthrop Storer (20 September 1914 – 14 December 2008) was an American ornithologist known for his work on avian systematics and evolution, especially of grebes. He was born in Pittsburgh, Pennsylvania. He was the 1997 recipient of the Cooper Ornithological Society’s Loye and Alden Miller Research Award, which is given in recognition of lifetime achievement in ornithological research.
