= James Van Remsen Jr. =

American ornithologist (born 1949)

James V. Remsen, Jr.
- Born: James Vanderbeek Remsen, Jr. September 21, 1949 (age 76); Newark, New Jersey, U.S.
- Education: Stanford University, University of California at Berkeley
- Known for: Founder of the South American Classification Committee of the American Ornithologists' Union
- Spouses: Catherine Lee Cummins (m. 1988–2010) Amy C. Shutt (m. 2010)
- Children: 3
- Awards: Brewster Medal (American Ornithologists' Union)
- Scientific career
- Fields: Ornithology
- Workplaces: Museum of Natural Science, Louisiana State University
- Thesis: Geographical ecology of Neotropical Kingfishers (1978)
- Doctoral advisor: Frank A. Pitelka
- Other academic advisors: Harold A. Mooney, Paul Ehrlich, and Ned K. Johnson
- Author abbrev. (zoology): Remsen

James Vanderbeek "Van" Remsen Jr. (born September 21, 1949) is an American ornithologist. His main research field is the Neotropical avifauna. In 1999, he founded the South American Classification Committee. In 2013, he was honored with the Brewster Medal of the American Ornithologists' Union.

== Career ==
In 1967, Remsen earned his high-school diploma at the Phillips Academy in Andover, Massachusetts. In summer 1968 he worked for the Denver Wildlife Research Center. In 1971, he graduated both to Master of Arts and Bachelor of Arts in biology at Stanford University. In 1978, he received his PhD in zoology at the University of California, Berkeley under the direction of Frank Pitelka with his dissertation "Geographical ecology of Neotropical Kingfishers", based on almost two years of fieldwork in Amazonian Colombia and Bolivia. In the same year he became a professor and curator of birds at Louisiana State University.

Remsen published his first scientific paper at age 20, and published other technical papers during his graduate student years, including the article "On taking field notes" in the journal American Birds which became much-noticed by field observers and American birders in the following decades.

While at LSU, Remsen spent a total of two years in the remote areas of the Amazon and the Andes, which became the basis for the book An Annotated List of the Birds of Bolivia (ISBN 978-0931130168), which was published in 1989 in collaboration with Melvin Alvah Traylor Jr. In 1991, Remsen published the monograph Community Ecology of Neotropical Kingfishers, and in 1997 produced the monograph "Studies in Neotropical Ornithology Honoring Ted Parker" "Ornithological Monographs"" No. 48: 1–917), a collection of 51 peer-reviewed papers. In 2007, he co-edited with Carla Cicero another monograph honoring the career of his mentor Ned K. Johnson: "Festschrift to Ned K. Johnson: Geographic Variation and Evolution in Birds.

To start a standardized classification and nomenclature of the Neotropical avifauna, Remsen sent a proposal to the American Ornithologists' Union in 1997 to create a South American counterpart to the already known AOU Check-list Committee which covered the avifauna of the Western Hemisphere from Panama and north to the Caribbean. In 1999, the proposal for the constitution of the South American Classification Committee (SACC) has been approved and in October 2000 the first classification on the split of the Huayco Tinamou (Rhynchotus maculicollis) from the Red-winged Tinamou (Rhynchotus rufescens) was available online. The system that Remsen invented for SACC was to place all proposals for change online and open access, as well as comments and votes concerning those proposals; thus, the system is completely transparent and qualified non-committee members are invited to contribute. Remsen is also a member (since 1984) of the American Ornithologists' Union's North American Classification Committee and thus co-author of the printed version of that classification.

In 1998, Remsen co-described (with Robb Thomas Brumfield) the subspecies Cinnycerthia fulva gravesi and Cinnycerthia fulva fitzpatricki of the fulvous wren. In 2003, he wrote the 196-page chapter of the family of ovenbirds (Furnariidae) in the eighth volume of the Handbook of the Birds of the World and in collaboration with Edward C. Dickinson he was co-author of the third edition of the Howard and Moore Complete Checklist of the Birds of the World. In 2013, they collaborated again on the fourth edition of the Howard & Moore checklist on non-passerines.

In 2016, Remsen was one of the co-authors of the richly illustrated field guide Birds of Bolivia (ISBN 978-9990596182) along with Sebastian K. Herzog, Ryan S. Terrill, A. E. Jahn, O. Maillard Z., V. H. García-Solíz, R. MacLeod, A. Maccormick, and J. Q. Vidoz.

== Honors ==
In 2013, Remsen received the Brewster Medal of the American Ornithologists' Union for his contributions to the study, the taxonomy, and nomenclature of the South American avifauna. In 1994, he was commemorated with the species' epithet of the vulnerable chestnut-bellied cotinga (Doliornis remseni) which is found in Colombia, Ecuador, and Peru.
