= Margaret Morse Nice Medal =

Ornithological accolade

The Margaret Morse Nice Medal is an ornithological award made annually by the Wilson Ornithological Society (WOS). It was established in 1997 (29 years ago) and named in honour of ornithologist Margaret Morse Nice (1883–1974). The medal recipient is expected to give the plenary lecture at the WOS annual general meeting.

== Recipients ==
Source: Wilson Ornithological Society

- 1997 – Elsie Collias and Nick Collias (University of California, Los Angeles), "Seeking to understand the living bird"
- 1998 – Ellen Ketterson and Val Nolan (Indiana University), "Studying birds: one species at a time"
- 1999 – Frances C. James
- 2000 – Susan M. Smith
- 2001 – Glen E. Woolfenden
- 2002 – Richard T. Holmes
- 2003 – Robert E. Ricklefs
- 2004 – Stephen T. Emlen
- 2005 – Bridget J. M. Stutchbury and Eugene S. Morton
- 2006 – Gary Stiles
- 2007 – Patricia L. Schwagmeyer and Douglas Mock
- 2008 – Jerome Jackson
- 2009 – Sidney A. Gauthreaux (Clemson University), "Bird movements in the atmosphere: discoveries from radar and visual studies"
- 2010 – Robert B. Payne and Laura Payne (University of Michigan), "Brood parasitism in cuckoos, cowbirds, and African finches"
- 2011 – Richard N. Conner (USDA-Forest Service (retired)), "The ecology of the Red-cockaded Woodpecker, by necessity a multidiscipline study"
- 2012 – Peter R. Grant & B. Rosemary Grant (Princeton University), "A long-term study of Darwin's Finches"
- 2013 – Edward Burtt, Jr. (Ohio Wesleyan University), "From passion to science to the evolution of avian color"
- 2014 – Don Kroodsma (University of Massachusetts-Amherst), "Birdsong: the hour before dawn"
- 2015 – Erica H. Dunn (Environment Canada}, "Bird observatories: Diversity and opportunity"
- 2016 – John C. Wingfield (Department of Neurobiology, Physiology and Behavior University of California), "Nomads, pioneers and fugitives: on the move in a capricious world"
- 2017 – Frank R. Moore (University of Southern Mississippi), "Stopover biology of migratory songbirds: challenges, consequences and connections"
- 2018 – Reed Bowman (Archbold Biological Station), "Change on the long-term study of the Florida Scrub-Jay: A fifty-year perspective"
- 2019 – Robert L. Curry (Villanova University), "Transformation of familiar birds into model organisms: what chickadees can teach us"
- 2020 – Bette A. Loiselle (University of Florida) "Three decades of studying Neotropical birds: lessons learned along the way"
- 2021 – Ellen Ketterson (Indiana University) "Long term research on an ordinary extraordinary songbird: the dark-eyed junco"
- 2022 – Chris Rimmer (Executive Director, Vermont Center for Ecostudies) "Bicknell’s Thrush: Scientific surprises and conservation connections across the hemisphere"
- 2023 - Scott Edwards (Alexander Agassiz Professor of Zoology and Curator of Ornithology in the Museum of Comparative Zoology, Harvard University) “Linking Micro- and Macroevolution: Exploring divergence, innovation and adaptation in birds”
- 2024 - Ron Mumme (Professor Emeritus of Biology, Allegheny College) “A tale of the tail in Hooded Warblers: Foraging performance, uniparental desertion, and stabilizing selection”
- 2025 - Sara Morris (Executive Director, Shoals Marine Laboratory) “Lessons from Appledore: Insights into migration and stopover ecology from a long-term banding station”

== See also ==
- List of ornithology awards
