= Frank Pitelka =

American ornithologist

Frank Alois Pitelka
- Born: March 27, 1916; Chicago, Illinois, U.S.
- Died: October 10, 2003 (aged 87)
- Education: University of Illinois (B.S., 1939); University of California, Berkeley (Ph.D., 1946)
- Scientific career
- Fields: Ornithology
- Workplaces: University of California, Berkeley
- Doctoral advisor: Alden Miller
- Doctoral students: Van Remsen

Frank Alois Pitelka (27 March 1916 – 10 October 2003) was an American ornithologist. He was the 2001 recipient of the Cooper Ornithological Society’s Loye and Alden Miller Research Award, which is given in recognition of lifetime achievement in ornithological research. In 1992, Dr. Pitelka received the Eminent Ecologist Award from the Ecological Society of America.
