= Miquelon Island (Northeast Coast) Important Bird Area =

Important Bird Area in Saint Pierre and Miquelon

Coordinates: 47°05′24″N 56°19′12″W

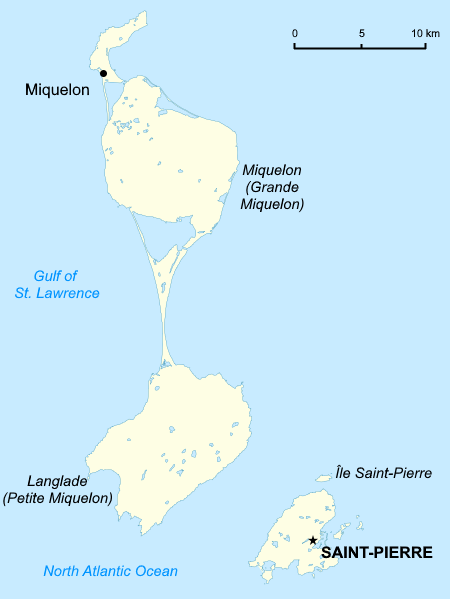

The Miquelon Island (Northeast Coast) Important Bird Area is an area of open sea immediately off the coast of Miquelon-Langlade in the small French archipelago of Saint Pierre and Miquelon off the southern coast of Newfoundland in the North Atlantic Ocean. The 4000 ha site lies off the north and east sides of the island from the waters around Cape Miquelon to the eastern side of La Dune isthmus. It has been identified as an Important Bird Area (IBA) by BirdLife International because it supports a wintering population of red-necked grebes.

== Description ==
Saint Pierre and Miquelon is an overseas collectivity of France in the North Atlantic Ocean, off the southern coast of the province of Newfoundland and Labrador in Canada. The Miquelon Island (Northeast Coast) Important Bird Area was first recognized in 2008. The IBA consists of the waters immediately off the northern and eastern coasts of the island of Miquelon-Langlade, the larger of the two islands in the collectivity. The IBA stretches from the Isthmus of Langlade north to Cape Miquelon; its total area is 346.76 km^{2}. The area comprises almost entirely of open marine waters. The site is threatened by hunting and oil pollution. Placentia Bay is home to the Come By Chance Refinery and the IBA is close to shipping lanes used by tankers to transport oil there. Common eiders are especially threatened by hunting.

=== Fauna ===
The IBA hosts populations of red-necked grebes, common eiders, and piping plovers. The site was recognized as an IBA due to its importance to red-necked grebes; the population in the region each winter from 1985 to 1999 was estimated to number between 450 and 800 individuals. A 1995 survey estimated the total wintering population of common eiders in the IBA to number around 4,000 individuals.

== See also ==
- Grand Colombier
