= Clifton F. Hodge =

American naturalist and professor (1859–1949)

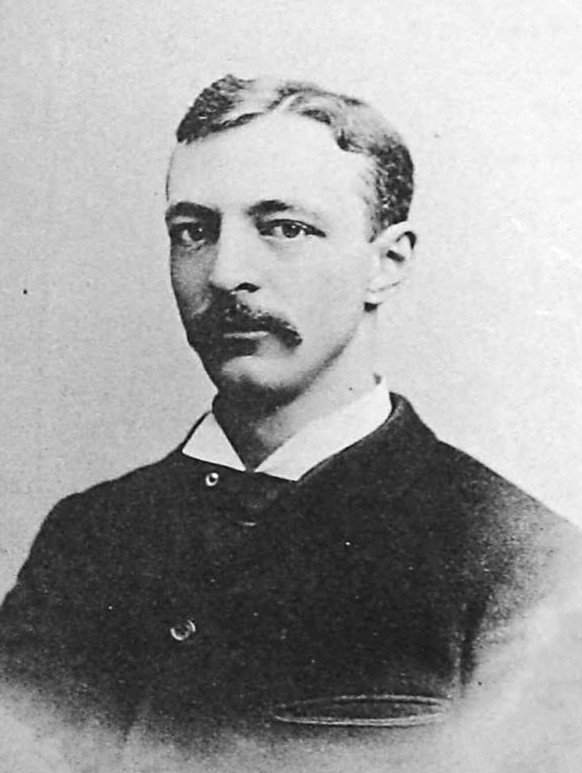
Hodge c. 1893

Clifton Fremont Hodge (16 October 1859 – 1949) was an American professor of physiology who worked at Clark University. An educator and a keen experimental biologist, he took great interest in natural history, animal behavior, and public understanding of biology, taking an active role in public debates on vivisection, experimentation on animals, conservation, and evolution. He opposed a bounty offered for specimens of the last few passenger pigeons which was eventually withdrawn. His textbook Civic Biology (1919) was the last biology text dealing with evolution before the anti-evolution movement began in 1920.

== Biography ==
Hodge was born in Janesville, Wisconsin on 16 October 1859 to Mary (Merrill) and Nelson Wellington. He graduated with a BA from Ripon College in 1882, and worked as a civil engineer in Montana and Wyoming before joining Johns Hopkins University in 1886. Receiving a Ph.D. in 1889 he also worked in the university museum as a curator and was a fellow in biology. He worked as a naturalist on the USFC Fish Hawk and then joined Clark University where he worked on neurobiology while also promoting biological education at all levels including sex education in high schools. He demonstrated fatigue in nerve cells by continuous stimulation of sympathetic and spinal ganglia of frogs. He conducted experiments on the effect of alcohol to rats, cats and dogs as part of the Committee of Fifty and its subcommittee on physiology under H. P. Bowditch of Harvard, J. S. Billings, R. H. Chittenden and W. H. Welch. His students worked on a variety of topics including a study of crayfish by Floyd Chidester and fungi by W. A. Matheny. He then moved to the University of Wisconsin. From 1913 he served as professor of biology at the University of Oregon. He studied problems related to nuisance insects and worked on efficient traps.

Hodge was an advocate of animal experiments and opposed the arguments of anti-vivisectionists. In 1896, he commented that "after conscientiously reading their literature for the past five years I feel warranted in saying that science has little to fear from the efforts of the antivivisection societies." His textbook Civic Biology (1919) coauthored with Jean Dawson (who was later his wife) was among the last pro-evolution texts to be published prior to the 1920s anti-Darwinian movement.

He became a professor of extension at the University of Florida around 1919, taking an interest in applied biology, including local problems relating to flies and mosquitoes.

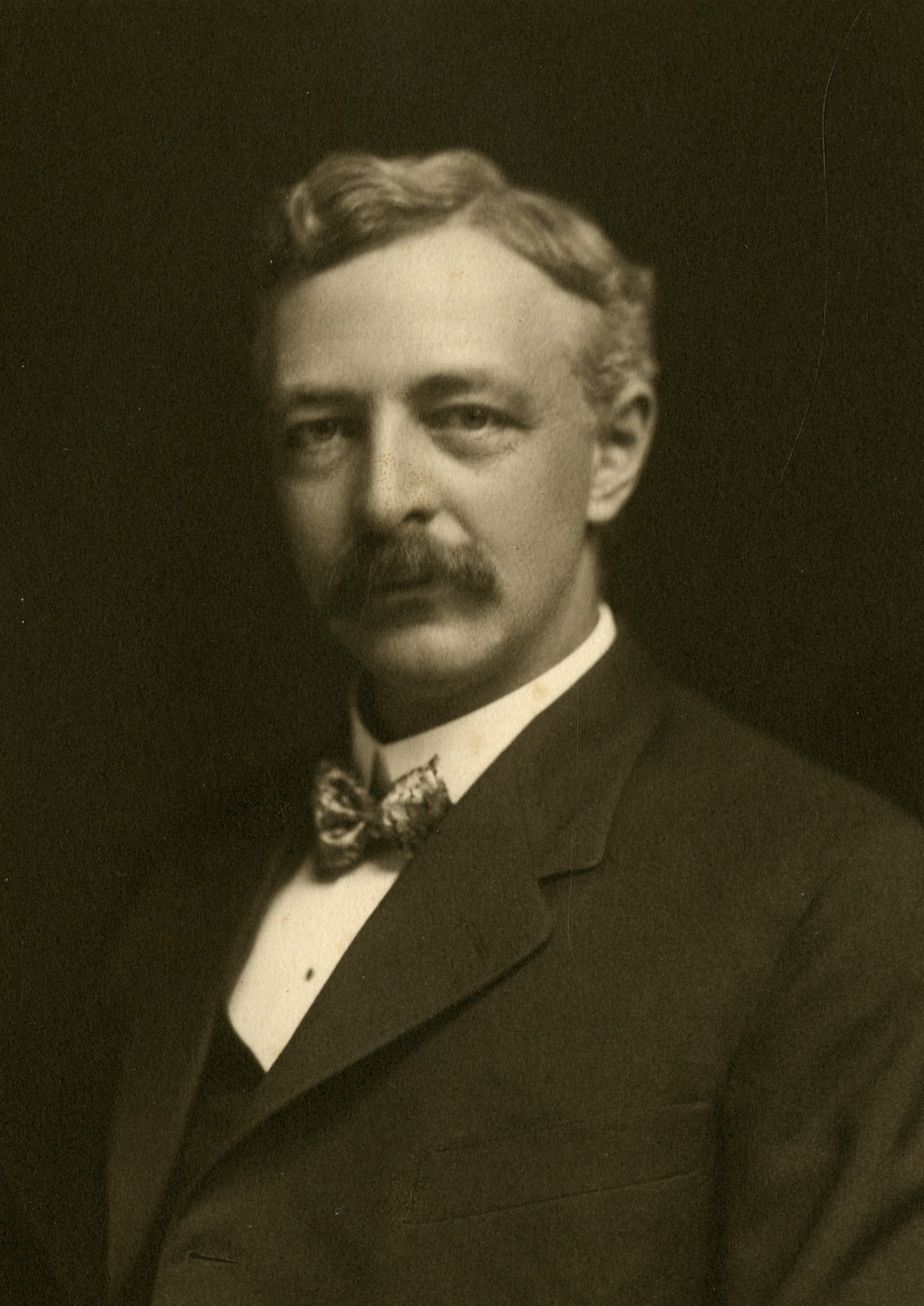
Undated portrait from the Smithsonian Institution Archives

Hodge was a keen naturalist, outdoors educator, and a member of the American Ornithologists' Union (AOU). At the 1909 meeting of the AOU he raised issue with the $100 reward being offered by Colonel Anthony Kuser for fresh specimens of the passenger pigeon and stated that he would not shoot a pigeon for even $1000. Kuser subsequently changed the reward to $300 for evidence of breeding. Hodge was also interested in animal as well as human behavior and introduced the idea of the ball and field test which was developed by his student Lewis M. Terman more formally and used in psychology studies. He examined how animals navigated their habitat and was critical of any suggestions of unknown senses and suggested rigorous experimental approaches. He wrote that "All animals, from amoeba to man, spend a good share of their time searching for something or other. May there not be a fundamental logic of search as universal as the search itself?. . . What is the path or curve of logical search?" and experimented on animal and human search strategies. Hodge examined homing pigeons and noted that there was learning involved in their homing. He also attempted to domesticate ruffed grouse and raised bobwhite quails. He influenced the ornithologist Margaret Morse Nice.

Photographs by Hodge on nature education

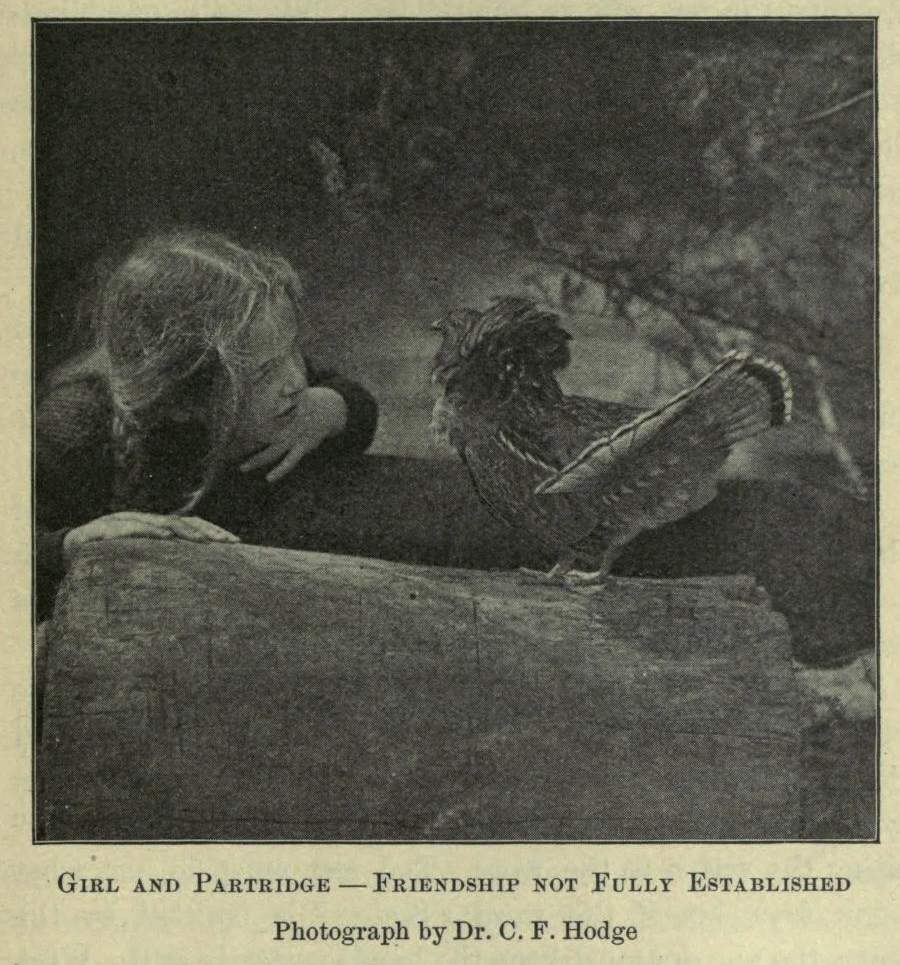

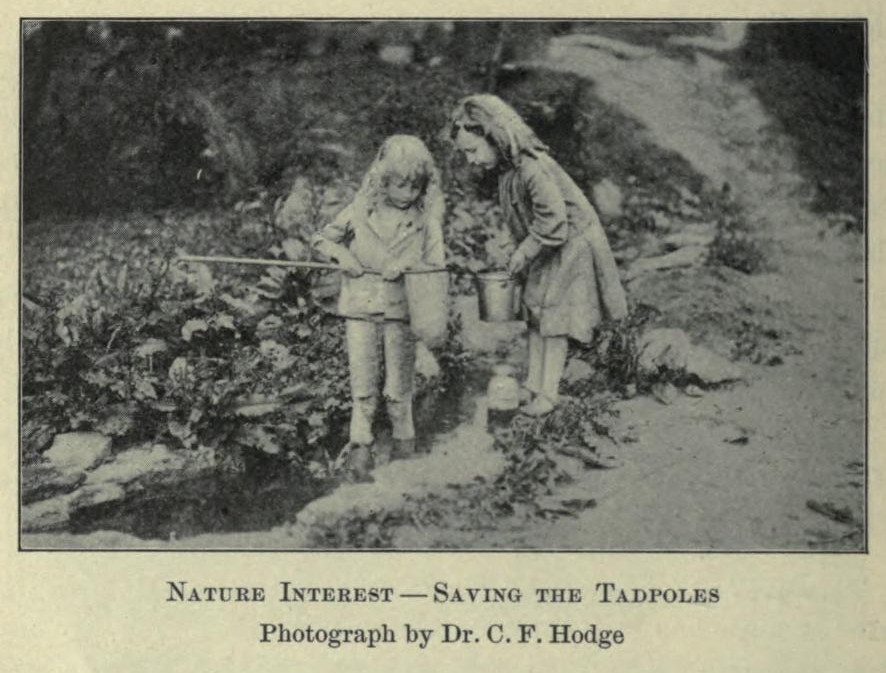

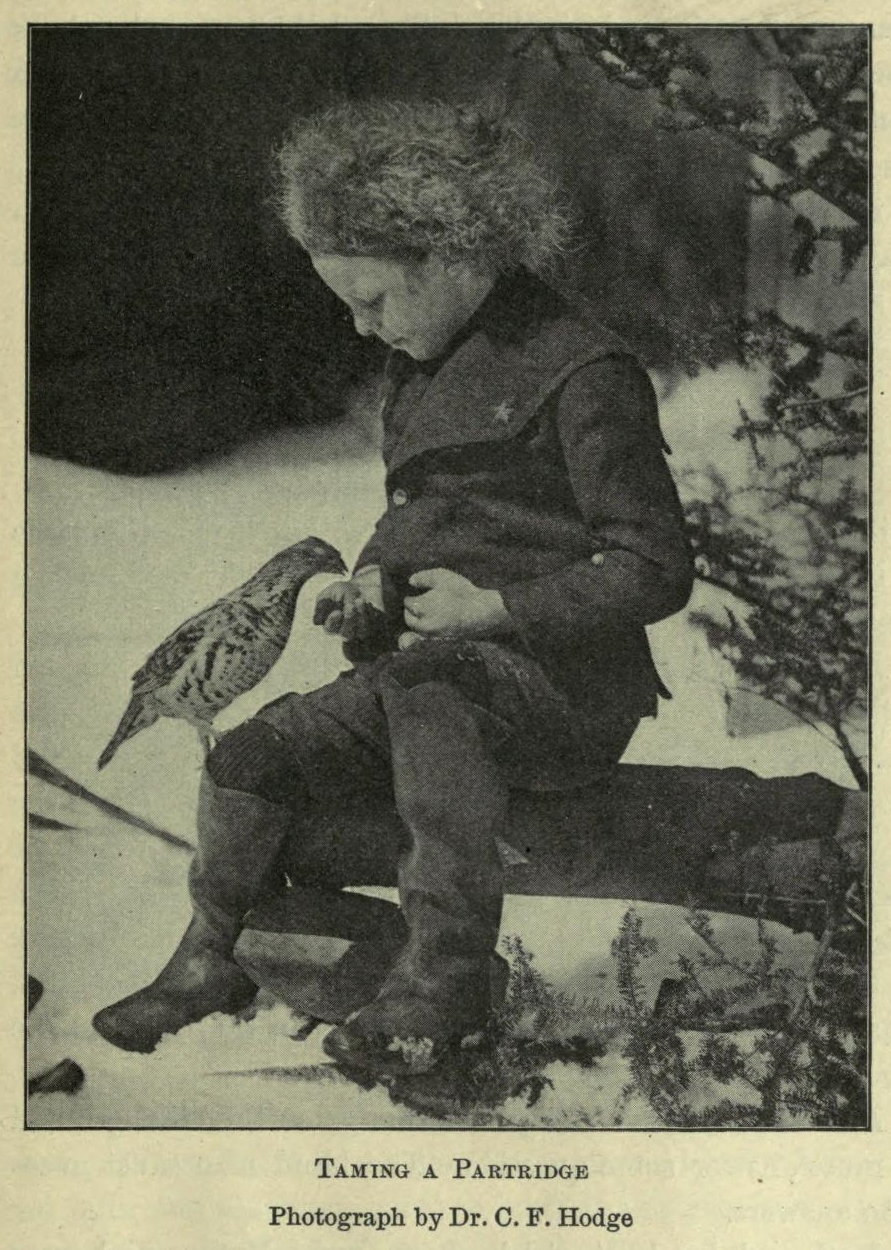

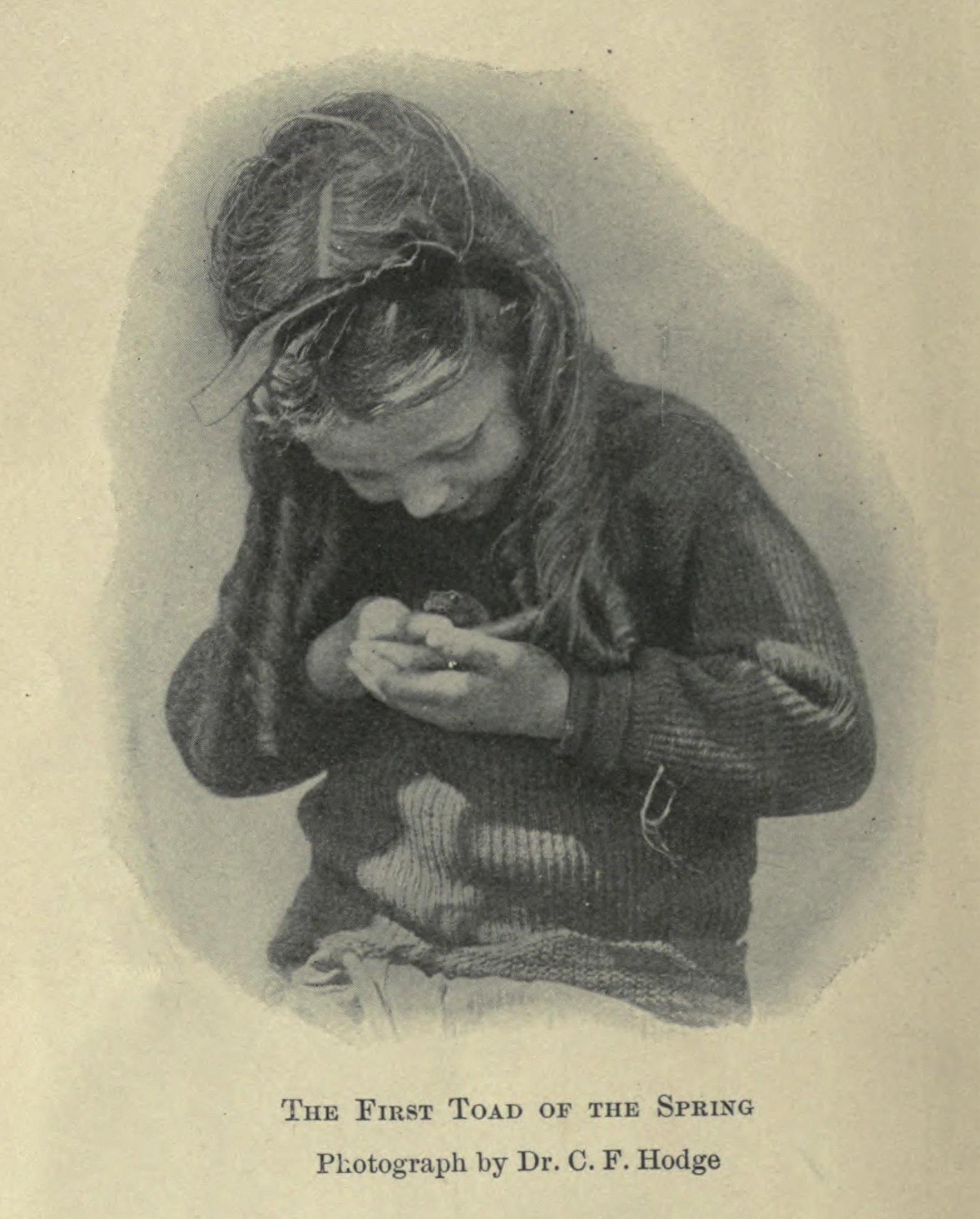

== Personal life ==
He married Thekla Johanna Eversz (1858–1930), of Wesel, Germany in 1888 and they had two children. He married Jean Dawson (1872-24 April 1928) in 1915 and settled in Sebring, Florida where he died.

== Selected publications ==
- The Bobwhite (1890)
- A Microscopical Study of Changes Due to Functional Activity in Nerve Cells (1892)
- The Vivisection Question (1896)
- Experiments on the Physiology of Alcohol Made Under the Auspices of the Committee of Fifty (1897)
- Nature Study. Our Common Birds. (1899)
- Nature Study and Life (1902)
- Civic Biology (1918)
