= Frances James (ecologist) =

American ecologist

Frances Crews James (born September 29, 1930) is an American ecologist who served as a Professor of Biological Sciences at Florida State University.

James studied geographic variation in the size and shape of birds, leading to transplant experiments with red-winged blackbirds and to tests of the theoretical assumptions underlying selection models. She is a member of the American Academy of Arts and Sciences. James, originally from Philadelphia, Pennsylvania, was immersed in the stream of biology at an early age being involved in the Academy of Natural Sciences Expeditions for Everyone.

In 1984 James was the first woman to become president of the American Ornithologists Union serving for two years until 1986. She was awarded the Eminent Ecologist Award in January 1997; in the same year she also received the Outstanding Leadership Award from the American Institute of Biological Sciences. She was awarded the 1999 Margaret Morse Nice Medal by the Wilson Ornithological Society. She has served on The Nature Conservancy Board of Governors and the Board of Directors for the World Wildlife Fund. She was one of the inaugural Fellows of the Ecological Society of America in 2012.

== Academic career ==
James completed her A.B. (Bachelor of Arts) in zoology at Mount Holyoke College and went on to do her M.S. (Master of Science) at Louisiana State University. She then finished her Ph.D. in Zoology from the University of Arkansas in 1970 at the age of 40 after raising a family of three daughters with her then husband ornithologist Douglas A. James. Her dissertation involved observing patterns of intraspecific size variation in 12 species of birds found in areas of the United States. James looked specifically at Bergmann’s rule hypothesizing that temperature may not be the most important factor determining body size patterns across gradients.

In 1996 Frances James and her colleague at the University of Florida, statistician Charles McCulloch published an article titled: New Approaches to Population Trends in Land Birds. They proposed novel approaches to analyzing the data from the Breeding Bird Survey, data showed no general decline but significant declines in species from certain regions.

In 2009, with John Pourtless, she published an Ornithological Monograph entitled "Cladistics and the Origin of Birds: A Review and Two New Analyses". In this monograph they argue that both the “early-archosaur” and “crocodylomorph” hypotheses are at least as well supported as the BMT (birds are maniraptoran theropod dinosaurs) hypothesis. Also, the Kishino-Hasegawa tests they performed revealed no statistical difference between the hypothesis that birds were a clade nested within the Maniraptora and the hypothesis that core clades of Maniraptora (oviraptorosaurs, troodontids, and dromaeosaurs) were actually flying and flightless radiations within the clade bracketed by Archaeopteryx and modern birds (Aves). James and Pourtless concluded that because Aves might not belong within it, Theropoda as presently constituted might not be monophyletic. They further cautioned that a verificationist approach in the BMT literature may be producing misleading studies on the origin of birds.
