= Farmersburg Township, Clayton County, Iowa =

Township in Iowa, US

Farmersburg Township
- Township
- Location in Clayton County
- Coordinates: 42°56′56″N 091°18′21″W
- Country: United States
- State: Iowa
- County: Clayton

Area
  - Total: 36.32 sq mi (94.08 km^{2})
  - Land: 36.31 sq mi (94.05 km^{2})
  - Water: 0.0077 sq mi (0.02 km^{2}) 0.02%
- Elevation: 1,060 ft (323 m)

Population (2000)
  - Total: 605
  - Density: 17/sq mi (6.4/km^{2})
- GNIS feature ID: 0467822

Farmersburg Township is a township in Clayton County, Iowa, United States. As of the 2000 census, its population was 605.

== History ==
Farmersburg Township was first settled in 1846. The pioneering ornithologist Althea Sherman, who made the first detailed study of chimney swifts was from Farmersburg Township.

== Geography ==
Farmersburg Township covers an area of 36.32 square miles (94.1 km^{2}) and contains one incorporated settlement, Farmersburg. According to the USGS, it contains three cemeteries: Giard, National and Winkawitsch.
