= Bette A. Loiselle =

American ornithologist and ecologist

Bette Ann Loiselle (born July 5, 1957, in Burlington, Vermont) is an American neotropical ornithologist, neotropical ecologist, and conservation biologist.

== Education and career ==
At the University of Illinois Urbana-Champaign she graduated in 1979 with a B.A. in biology and in 1981 with an M.S. in biology. In 1987 she received her Ph.D. in zoology (with a minor in botany) from the University of Wisconsin–Madison. Her Ph.D. thesis in entitled Birds and plants in a neotropical rain forest: seasonality and interactions. From 1987 to 1990 she was a naturalist for Betchart Expeditions in Cupertino, California. From 1988 to 1990 she was an adjunct research associate at the Natural Resources Institute at the University of Minnesota, Duluth. In the department of biology at the University of Missouri–St. Louis, she was from 1990 to 1996 an assistant professor, from 1996 to 2005 an associate professor, and from 2005 to 2010 a full professor, as well as from 1997 to 2003 the director of the International Center for Tropical Ecology, University of Missouri–St. Louis. From 2006 to 2008 she was on a 2-year leave of absence to work as a program officer for the Division of Environmental Biology, National Science Foundation, Washington, D.C. At the University of Florida, since 2011 she has been a professor in the Department of Wildlife Ecology and Conservation, as well as the director of the Tropical Conservation and Development Program at the University of Florida's Center for Latin American Studies.

Loiselle is the author or coauthor of more than 110 peer-review articles on the ecology and conservation of birds. She has mentored many graduate students and postdoctoral students from Latin America, including many women students. She has done research on "the use of GIS methods in species distribution mapping, the ecological role of animals as seed dispersers, mating systems and life histories of tropical birds, and the potential effects of global change on the distribution of birds and their plant foods in tropical systems of the Western Hemisphere." She has done extensive research in Brazil, Costa Rica, and Ecuador.

She was awarded in 2018 the Brewster Medal and in 2020 the Margaret Morse Nice Medal. In connection with the 2020 medal, at the Wilson Ornithological Society's annual meeting she gave the plenary lecture Three decades of studying Neotropical birds: lessons learned along the way.

== Selected publications ==
- Loiselle, Bette A.; Blake, John G. (1991). "Temporal Variation in Birds and Fruits Along an Elevational Gradient in Costa Rica". Ecology. 72 (1): 180–193. doi:10.2307/1938913. JSTOR 1938913.
- Loiselle, Bette A.; Sork, Victoria L.; Nason, John; Graham, Catherine (November 1995). "Spatial genetic structure of a tropical understory shrub, PSYCHOTRIA OFFICINALIS (RuBIACEAE)". American Journal of Botany. 82 (11): 1420–1425. doi:10.1002/j.1537-2197.1995.tb12679.x.
- Loiselle, Bette A.; Howell, Christine A.; Graham, Catherine H.; Goerck, Jaqueline M.; Brooks, Thomas; Smith, Kimberly G.; Williams, Paul H. (2003). "Avoiding Pitfalls of Using Species Distribution Models in Conservation Planning". Conservation Biology. 17 (6): 1591–1600. doi:10.1111/j.1523-1739.2003.00233.x. S2CID 34443911.
- Elith, Jane; H. Graham, Catherine; P. Anderson, Robert; Dudík, Miroslav; Ferrier, Simon; Guisan, Antoine; J. Hijmans, Robert; Huettmann, Falk; R. Leathwick, John; Lehmann, Anthony; Li, Jin; G. Lohmann, Lucia; A. Loiselle, Bette; Manion, Glenn; Moritz, Craig; Nakamura, Miguel; Nakazawa, Yoshinori; McC. M. Overton, Jacob; Townsend Peterson, A.; J. Phillips, Steven; Richardson, Karen; Scachetti-Pereira, Ricardo; E. Schapire, Robert; Soberón, Jorge; Williams, Stephen; S. Wisz, Mary; E. Zimmermann, Niklaus (April 2006). "Novel methods improve prediction of species' distributions from occurrence data". Ecography. 29 (2): 129–151. doi:10.1111/j.2006.0906-7590.04596.x. S2CID 8667013.
- Loiselle, Bette A.; Jørgensen, Peter M.; Consiglio, Trisha; Jiménez, Iván; Blake, John G.; Lohmann, Lúcia G.; Montiel, Olga Martha (2008). "Predicting species distributions from herbarium collections: Does climate bias in collection sampling influence model outcomes?". Journal of Biogeography. 35 (1): 105–116. doi:10.1111/j.1365-2699.2007.01779.x. S2CID 85852403.
