= Lynds Jones =

American naturalist and ornithologist

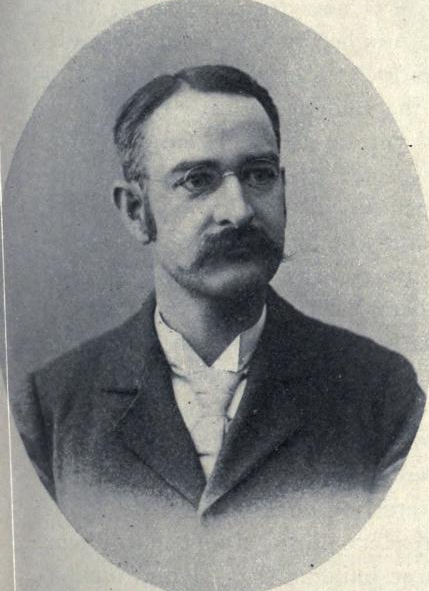
Portrait from Bird Lore (1903)

Lynds Jones (5 January 1865 – 11 February 1951) was an American naturalist, professor and a pioneer in the field of animal ecology. He introduced academic courses in ornithology and ecology at Oberlin College where he taught for many years. Jones was also the founding editor of the Wilson Bulletin produced by the Wilson Ornithological Club of which he was a member from its inception in 1888.

== Life and work ==
Jones was born to Millwright Publius Virgilius and Lavinia Burton Jones in Jefferson, Ohio. The family moved to Grinnell, Iowa where Jones developed an interest in the birds of the region. Along with a neighbor who sold wild bird eggs, he learned to collect them. An interest in nature was also supported by a teacher George W. Tallmon who set up a chapter of the Louis Agassiz Association supported by St. Nicholas Magazine. He studied at Grinnell College and moved to Oberlin College in 1890 obtaining an A.B. in 1892 and an M.S. in 1895. He then moved to Chicago to study under Henry C. Cowles and V.E. Shelford, obtaining a Ph.D. in 1905 with a dissertation on the development of nestling feathers. His thesis was on the development of feathers in nestlings. Jones returned to Oberlin College and taught zoology apart from serving as a curator at the natural history museum of the college. Jones was the first to offer a course in ornithology in 1895 and one on ecology.

Jones was a founding member of the Wilson Ornithological Club in 1888 and served as the founding editor for its journal, the Wilson Bulletin (initially issued under other titles). Jones maintained records of arrivals and departures of migrating birds and organized count and censuses before the Christmas bird counts were established. At Oberlin, he attempted to inculcate field work as part of ecology but this was disapproved initially. From 1908 Jones was the head of a division of animal ecology and a full professor by 1922. His classes were popular, with 150 students a year.

According to "The Pettingell Report," published by the American Birding Association in 1974, Jones and bird-watcher W.L. Dawson, were the first people known to have identified over 100 species of birds in a single day. Dawson and Jones identified 102 species on 17 May 1898, in Lorain County, Ohio. On 19 May 1900, Jones became the first solo bird-watcher to identify 100 species in a single day, a feat which he also accomplished in Lorain County, with a total of exactly 100. These "big days" culminated in Jones and two other bird-watchers finding 144 species in Erie County, Ohio, on 13 May 1907, a record which stood until 1929.

Lynds married Clara Mabelle Tallmon, daughter of an older neighbour in Iowa who taught him collection and taxidermy, in 1892.
