= Hernandez Reservoir =

Artificial lake in California

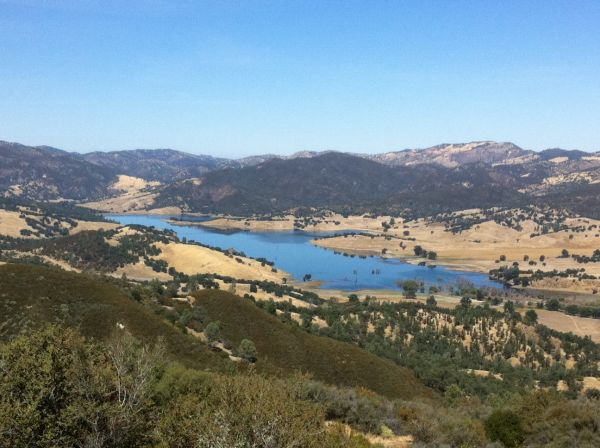
- View of Hernandez Reservoir from Laguna Mountain

- Location within California Location within the United States
- Location: Diablo Range; San Benito County, California
- Coordinates: 36.3838°N 120.8236°W
- Type: Reservoir
- Primary inflows: San Benito River; Laguna Creek
- Primary outflows: San Benito River
- Catchment area: 85 square miles (220 km^{2})
- Basin countries: United States
- Managing agency: San Benito County Water District
- Surface area: 590 acres (240 ha)
- Water volume: 18,000 acre-feet (22,000,000 m^{3})
- Surface elevation: 735 m (2,411 ft)
- References: U.S. Geological Survey Geographic Names Information System: Hernandez Reservoir

Hernandez Reservoir is an artificial lake created in by impounding water from the San Benito River in the Diablo Mountain Range of San Benito County, California, United States.

== See also ==
- List of dams and reservoirs in California
- List of lakes in California
