= Margaret Morse Nice =

American ornithologist (1883–1974)

- Nice studying a nest of baby field sparrows (1956)
- Born: December 6, 1883; Amherst, Massachusetts
- Died: June 26, 1974 (aged 90); Chicago, Illinois
- Education: Mount Holyoke College (BA); Clark University (MA)
- Spouse: Leonard Blaine Nice
- Scientific career
- Fields: Ornithology; ethology; psychology

Margaret Morse Nice (December 6, 1883 – June 26, 1974) was an American ornithologist, ethologist, and child psychologist who made an extensive study of the life history of the song sparrow and was author of Studies in the Life History of the Song Sparrow (1937). She observed and recorded hierarchies in chickens about three decades ahead of Thorleif Schjelderup-Ebbe, who coined the term "pecking order". After her marriage, she made observations on language learning in her children and wrote numerous research papers.

== Early life ==
Nice was born on December 6, 1883, in Amherst, Massachusetts. The daughter of Anson D. Morse, professor of history at Amherst College, and Margaret Duncan (Ely), she was the fourth child, with two older brothers, Ely and William; an elder sister Sarah; a younger sister, Katherine; and two younger brothers, Harold and Edward.

As a child, she took an interest in nature; her mother, who had studied botany at Mount Holyoke College when it was Mount Holyoke Female Seminary, taught her the names of wildflowers. Her first book dealing with birds was Jenny and the Birds (1860) by Lucy Guernsey, which was read out by her mother. She later came across John B. Grant's Our Common Birds and How to Know Them (1891). In her posthumously published autobiography Research Is a Passion With Me (1979), she wrote that "the most cherished Christmas present of my life came in 1895. Mabel Osgood Wright's Bird-Craft." This book had color illustrations of birds and it guided her to keep notes on local birds when she was twelve years old. With careful note-making she was even able to use her notes taken when she was 13 years old to compare the rates of fledgling success of young American robins, chipping sparrows, and least flycatchers then and 61 years later.

She received her B.A. in psychology from Mount Holyoke College in 1906 and her M.A. in biology from Clark University in Worcester, Massachusetts in 1915. At Clark University she was only one of two women graduate students.

While at Clark she was greatly influenced by G. Stanley Hall and Clifton Fremont Hodge. Hall would spark her later interest in child psychology while Hodge encouraged her work in conservation. Hodge had notably persuaded Anthony R. Kuser to withdraw a $100 reward for passenger pigeon specimens and instead offer a $300 reward for allowing them to nest undisturbed. Hodge kept bobwhite quails at home and Margaret looked after them when Hodge was traveling. For her MA she produced the first comprehensive study on the diet of the northern bobwhite (Colinus virginianus).

== Later life ==
Margaret met Leonard Blaine Nice, commonly referred to by his middle name, at Clark University; they married in 1908. Blaine served as an instructor in physiology at Harvard Medical School for two years, following which the family moved to Norman, Oklahoma, where Blaine had accepted a faculty position in physiology and pharmacology at the university. They had five children, Constance, born 1911; Marjorie, 1912; Barbara, 1916; Eleanor, 1918; and Janet, born 1922. Eleanor died of pneumonia at age nine in Columbus, Ohio.

From 1913 to 1927 she studied the birds of Oklahoma, finally publishing her research in "Birds of Oklahoma" in 1931. During her time in Oklahoma, she also became very interested in child psychology, concerning which she published 18 articles.

She studied her own children, their vocabulary, sentence length, and speech development. Constance was the subject of her first study as part of her M.A. thesis "Development of a Child's Vocabulary in Relation to Environment" (1915). Nice published Marjorie and Eleanor's vocabularies in the Proceedings of the Oklahoma Academy of Sciences (1927). She noted that 19 three-year-old children averaged vocabularies of 910 words and reaching 3000 by six years. This contradicted an old idea that a laborer had a vocabulary of less than 300 words.

She also studied mourning doves and wrote about them in several pieces. She attended meetings of the National Association of Audubon Societies and came to know many ornithologists in the region. Ornithologist Althea Sherman, 30 years older than Nice, served as a mentor for Nice early in her career.

In 1927 she moved to Columbus, Ohio, where Blaine had accepted a professorship at the Ohio State University. This move gave her an opportunity to meet more ornithologists in the vicinity. At an American Ornithologists’ Union (AOU) meeting in 1927, she was greeted as "Mrs Mourning Dove Nice" by Florence Merriam Bailey. Here she carried out a study of song sparrows that established her as one of the leading ornithologists in the world, recording the behavior of individual birds over a long period of time. She initially studied two banded pairs of birds, named Uno and 4M, and later 69 banded pairs. Beginning in 1929, she spent eight years studying these birds and focused on interactions, breeding, territoriality, learning, instinct and song.

In 1931 she met Ernst Mayr at a meeting of the AOU. He was delighted to meet an American who was "interested in more than faunistic records and pretty pictures", encouraged her to write, and arranged the publication of the results of her studies. Nice was subsequently elected the first woman president of the Wilson Club and became the fifth woman to receive membership in the AOU, followed by a fellowship in 1934.

In 1932 the family went to Europe to attend the International Physiological Congress in Rome. In 1938 she spent two months studying the habits of captive birds with Konrad Lorenz in Austria. After the family moved to Chicago in 1936, she later became the vice-president of the Chicago Ornithological Society and the director of the Illinois Audubon Society. She wrote two popular books on her studies, The Watcher at the Nest (1939) and The Behavior of the Song Sparrow (1943).

Towards the end of the Second World War, she worked along with Joseph Hickey and others to help European ornithologists. As a supporter of wildlife and conservation, Nice fought to preserve the Wichita Mountains Wildlife Refuge, the Dinosaur National Monument, and the California redwoods, among other projects.

Like her mentor Althea Sherman, most of Nice's scientific endeavors were self-funded, which was important because of widespread gender discrimination in scientific circles at the time.

Margaret Morse Nice died in Chicago on June 26, 1974, from arteriosclerosis, two months after the death of her husband.

== Contributions to ornithology ==
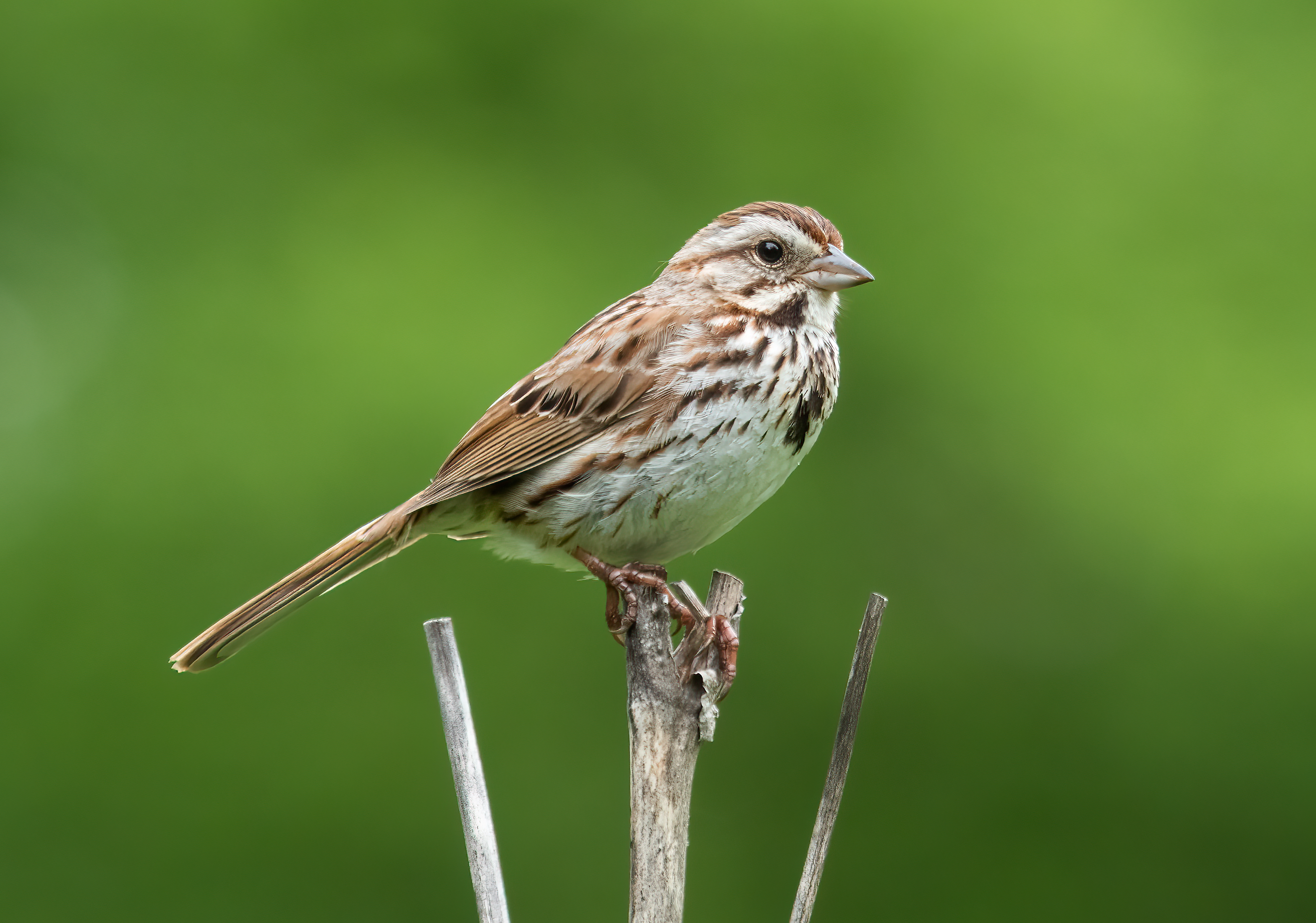
Song sparrow

Nice worked on the life-histories of birds at a time when most of the focus was on collection, description and geographic listing. Her work on the song sparrow in particular is considered a landmark, and her work in general was considered "so vast and difficult that the mind boggles at the time and patience required". Ernst Mayr wrote that Nice "almost single-handedly initiated a new era in American ornithology and the only effective counter movement against the list-chasing movement." Her first research paper was published with the help of Mayr and Erwin Stresemann in the German Journal für Ornithologie in 1933 and 1934 because American journals would not accept such long articles.

Nice wrote nearly 250 papers on birds, 3,000 book reviews and several books, including the Birds of Oklahoma (1924, 1931), The Watcher at the Nest (1939) and her autobiography. Her autobiography was published posthumously with a preface by Konrad Lorenz.

== Honors ==
Nice was made an honorary member of the British, Finnish, German, Dutch, and Swiss ornithological societies. She received the AOU's Brewster Medal in 1942 for her studies of the song sparrow, becoming the second woman to receive it after Florence Merriam Bailey. She received two honorary doctorates, one from Mount Holyoke College during a class reunion (1955) and another from Elmira College (1962). Dean Richard Bond of Elmira College said about her:

She used the outdoors near her home as her laboratory and common species of birds as her subject. In so doing, she joined the ranks of the eminent ornithologists of all time, who saw so much in what appeared common to so many

— Nice 1979:262–263

Ornithologist Robert Dickerman named a Mexican subspecies of song sparrow (Melospiza melodia niceae) after her.

In 1997 the Wilson Ornithological Society established the Margaret Morse Nice Medal for work in ornithology.

== Selected publications ==
- Nice, M. M. 1910. Food of the bobwhite. J. Econ. Ent. 3:295–313.
- Nice, M. M. 1930. Observations at a nest of Myrtle Warblers. Wilson Bull. 42:60–61.
- Nice, M. M. 1931. The birds of Oklahoma. Revised edition. Publ. Okla. Biol. Survey 3:1–224.
- Nice, M. M. 1937. Studies in the life history of the Song Sparrow. I. A population study of the Song Sparrow. Trans. Linn. Soc. N.Y. 4:1–247.
- Nice, M. M. 1939a. The social kumpan and the Song Sparrow. Auk 56:255–262. PDF
- Nice, M. M. 1939b. The watcher at the nest. Macmillan, New York.
- Nice, M. M. 1941. The role of territory in bird life. Am. Midl. Nat. 26:441–487.
- Nice, M. M. 1943. Studies in the life history of the Song Sparrow. II. The behavior of the Song Sparrow and other passerine birds. Trans. Linn. Soc. N.Y. 6:1–328.
- Nice, M. M. 1954. Problems of incubation periods in North American birds. Condor 56: 173–197.
- Nice, M. M. 1962. Development of behavior in precocial birds. Trans. Linn. Sot. N.Y. 8: l-211.
- (with L. B. Nice) (1914) A city kept awake by the honking of migrating geese. Bird-Lore 16 : 119.
- A third Christmas census. Proceedings of the Oklahoma Academy of Science 2 (1922):31–32.
- Nesting records from 1920 to 1922 from Norman, Oklahoma. University of Oklahoma Bulletin 3 (1923): 61–67.
- Extension of range of the robin and Arkansas kingbird in Oklahoma. Auk 41 (1924): 565–568.
- (with L. B. Nice) The birds of Oklahoma. University of Oklahoma Bulletin n.s. (286) (1924): 1–122.
- Observations on shorebirds in central Oklahoma in 1924. Wilson Bulletin 37 (1925): 199–203.
- The bird life of a forty acre tract in central Oklahoma. University of Oklahoma Bulletin. Proceedings of the Oklahoma Academy of Science 7 (1927): 75–93.
- New nesting records in Cleveland County in 1925 and 1926. University of Oklahoma Bulletin. Proceedings of the Oklahoma Academy of Science 7 (1927): 72–74.
- Pileated woodpeckers wintering in Cleveland County, Oklahoma. Auk 44 (1927): 103.
- Seasonal fluctuations in bird life in central Oklahoma. Condor 29 (1927): 144–149.
- Late nesting of indigo bunting and field sparrow in southeastern Ohio. Auk 45 (1928): 102.
- Magnolia warblers in Pelham, Massachusetts in 1928. Wilson Bulletin 40 (1928): 252–253.
- The morning twilight song of the crested flycatcher. Wilson Bulletin 40 (1928): 225.
- Adventures at a window shelf. Oologist 46 (1929): 161–163.
- Domestic pigeons nest hunting on a mountain top. Auk 46 (1929): 543–544.
- Eight-mile censuses in 1927. Condor 31 (1929): 79.
- The Harris sparrow in central Oklahoma. Condor 31 (1929): 57–61.
- A hawk census from Arizona to Massachusetts. Wilson Bulletin 41 (1929): 93–95.
- Vocal performances of the rock wren in Oklahoma. Condor 31 (1929): 248–249.
- American egret and anhinga nesting in Oklahoma. Auk 55 (1930): 121–122.
- A list of the birds of the campus of the University of Oklahoma. Publications of the University of Oklahoma Biological Survey 2 (1930): 195–207.
- The Birds of Oklahoma. Rev. ed. Norman: University of Oklahoma Press, 1931.
- Notes on the twilight songs of the scissor-tailed and crested flycatchers. Auk 48 (1931): 123–124.
- Measurements of the white-throated and other sparrows to determine sex. Bird-Banding 3 (1932): 30–31.
- Female quail 'Bob-whiting.' Auk 50 (1933): 97.
- Locating returned song sparrows as nestlings. Bird-Banding 4 (1933): 51–52.
- Robins and Caroline chickadees remating. Bird-Banding 4 (1933): 157.
- Zur Naturgeschichte des Singammers. Journal fu¨r Ornithologie 81 (1933): 552–595.
- Zur Naturgeschichte des Singammers. Journal fu¨r Ornithologie 82 (1934): 1–96.
- The Eighth International Ornithological Congress. Bird-Banding 6 (1935): 29–31.
- Some ornithological experiences in Europe. Bird-Banding 4 (1935): 147–154.
- Storks in trees. Wilson Bulletin 47 (1935): 270–271.
- (with L. B. Nice and R. M. Kraft) Erythrocytes and hemoglobin in the blood of some American birds. Wilson Bulletin 47 (1935): 120–124.
- Late nesting of myrtle and black-throated green warblers in Pelham, Massachusetts. Auk 53 (1936): 89.
- Curious ways of the cowbird. Bird-Lore 39 (1937): 196–201.

=== Child psychology ===
- The Development of a Child's Vocabulary in Relation to Environment. Master's thesis, Clark University, 1915. Published in Pedagogical Seminary 22 (1915): 35–64.
- The speech of a left-handed child. Psychological Clinic 9 (1915): 115–117.
- The speech development of a child from eighteen months to six years. Pedagogical Seminary 24 (1917): 204–243.
- Ambidexterity and delayed speech development. Pedagogical Seminary 25 (1918):141–162.
- Concerning all day conversations. Pedagogical Seminary 27 (1920): 166–177.
- A child and nature. Pedagogical Seminary 28 (1921): 22–39.
- A child that would not talk. Proceedings of the Oklahoma Academy of Science 2 (1922): 108–111.
- Handedness and speech. Proceedings of the Oklahoma Academy of Science 2 (1922):10.

== See also ==
- Ornithologist Amelia Laskey, one of her scientific collaborators.
- Ornithologist Althea Sherman, a mentor for Nice early in her career.

== Other sources ==
- Ogilvie, Marilyn Bailey (2018). For the Birds: American Ornithologist Margaret Morse Nice. Norman, Oklahoma: University of Oklahoma Press. ISBN 978-0-8061-6069-6
- Burkhardt Jr., Richard W. (1970–1980). "Nice, Margaret Morse". Dictionary of Scientific Biography. Vol. 23. New York: Charles Scribner's Sons. pp. 277–280. ISBN 978-0-684-10114-9.
- Dunlap, Julie. "Birds in the Bushes: A Story About Margaret Morse Nice." Illustrated by Ralph L. Ramstad. 1996. Carolrhoda Books, Inc., Minneapolis, MN. +63 pp. ISBN 1-57505-006-4.
- Nice, M. M. 1979. "Research is a passion with me." Consolidated Amethyst Publications, Toronto.
