= Laguna Mountain Recreation Area =

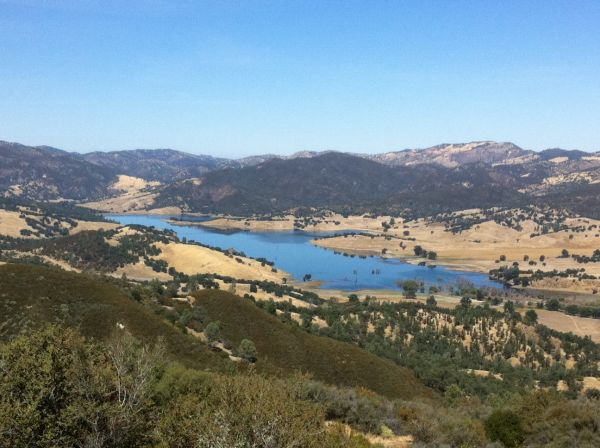
- View of Hernandez Reservoir from Laguna Mountain

- Location within California Location within the United States
- Location: San Benito County, California
- Nearest city: King City, California
- Coordinates: 36°20′53″N 120°51′02″W
- Governing body: Bureau of Land Management
- Website: www.blm.gov/visit/laguna-mountain

The Laguna Mountain Recreation Area is a park located in San Benito County, California, and administered by the Bureau of Land Management.

The recreation area encompasses 4,462-foot (1,360 m) Laguna Mountain of the Diablo Range, and is adjacent to Hernandez Reservoir.

The area consists of somewhat rugged terrain with rolling hills covered in dense brush. The area's vegetation is characterized by classic chaparral habitat, oak forests, and grassy meadows. Laguna Creek flows through the area most of the year, accompanied by a series of scenic waterfalls in the Laguna Creek gorge.

The recreation area features two campgrounds and three trailheads, among other recreation opportunities.

== See also ==
- Parks in San Benito County, California
- Bureau of Land Management areas in California
