= Robert Loftin =

American environmentalist, ornithologist, and philosopher

- Born: Robert Wayne Loftin; 1938
- Died: August 13, 1993 (aged 54–55)
- Education: Oglethorpe University; Florida State University
- Scientific career
- Fields: Ornithology; Philosophy
- Institutions: University of North Florida
- Thesis: The Problem of Explanation in History (1969)
- Doctoral advisor: W. H. Werkmeister

Robert Wayne Loftin (1938–1993) was an American environmentalist, ornithologist, and philosopher. He was a professor at the University of North Florida, where he founded the Sawmill Slough Conservation Club and designed the campus's nature trails. The trails on UNF's campus were subsequently renamed the Robert Loftin Nature Trails in his memory on August 31, 1993.

Loftin received his B.A. in humanities from Oglethorpe University and his M.A. and Ph.D. degrees from Florida State University. In 1988, he received the University of North Florida's Distinguished Professor Award. He died of cancer on August 13, 1993, at the age of 54.

Brian G. Norton, Michael Hutchins, Elizabeth F. Stevens, and Terry L. Maple dedicated the edited volume entitled, Ethics on the Ark: Zoos, Animal Welfare, and Wildlife Conservation (1995), published by Smithsonian Institution Press, to the memory of Robert W. Loftin. In his own posthumous article in this volume, entitled, "Captive Breeding of Endangered Species," Loftin concluded that, "animals should be taken out of the wild for captive breeding programs only if there is no alternative to extinction"; otherwise, "the priorities should be on maintaining the species intact in the wild and correcting the causes of endangerment in the first place."
