= The Wilson Journal of Ornithology =

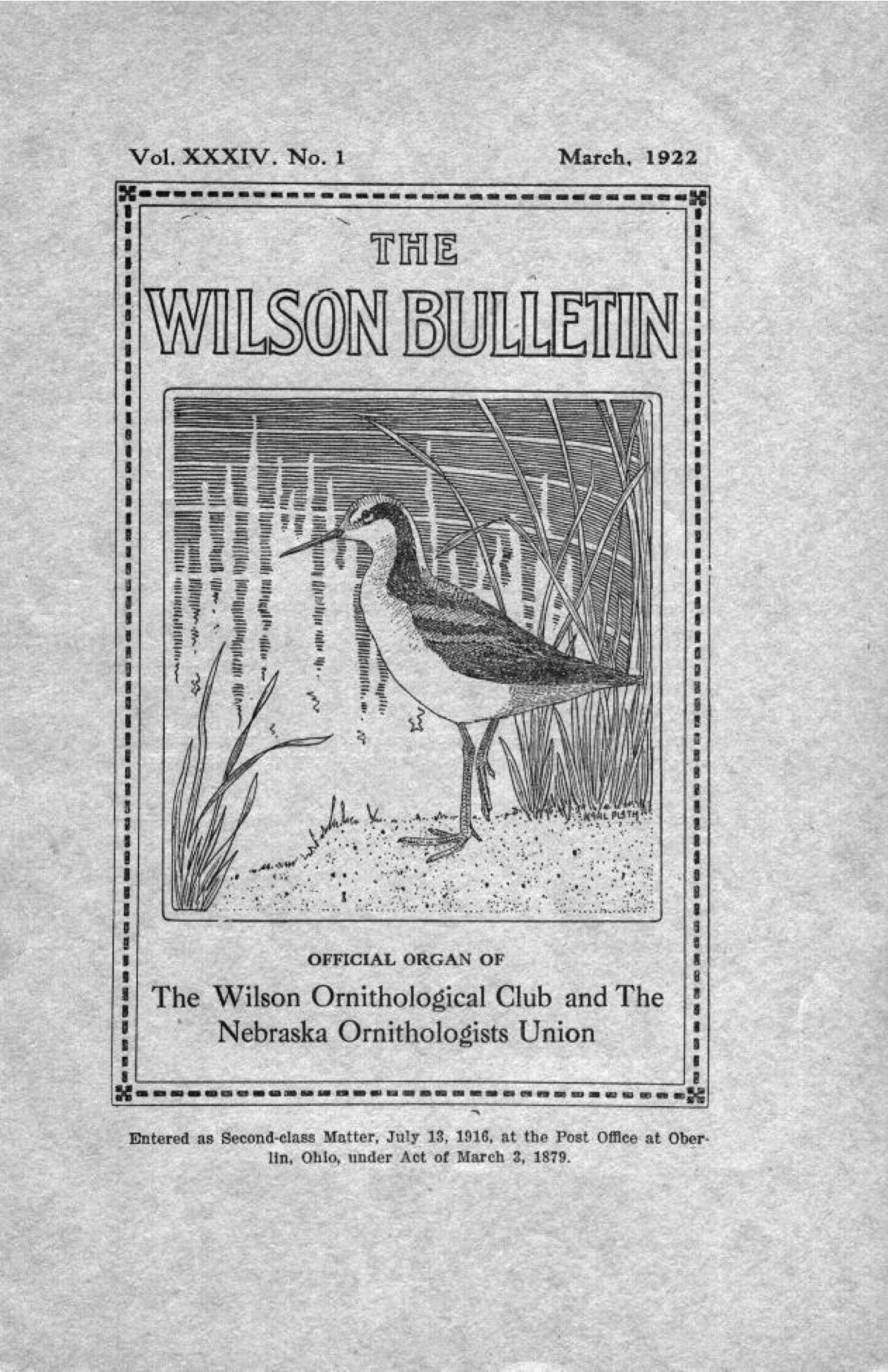
- 1922 cover
- Discipline: Ornithology
- Language: English

Publication details
- Former name: The Wilson Bulletin
- History: 1889–present
- Publisher: Wilson Ornithological Society (United States)
- Frequency: Quarterly
- Impact factor: 0.574 (2019)

Standard abbreviations
- ISO 4: Wilson J. Ornithol.

Indexing
- ISSN: 1559-4491 (print); 1938-5447 (web)

Links
- Journal homepage

The Wilson Journal of Ornithology (until 2006 The Wilson Bulletin) is a quarterly peer-reviewed scientific journal published by the Wilson Ornithological Society. Both the society and its journal were named after American ornithologist Alexander Wilson.

The journal consists of ornithological studies, short communications on bird observations, and book reviews. Most of the work disseminated through the journal is conducted in the Western Hemisphere.

== Abstracting and indexing ==
The journal is abstracted and indexed in:

- Science Citation Index Expanded
- Scopus
- Academic Search Ultimate
- BIOSIS
- GEOBASE
- CAB Abstracts

== See also ==
- List of ornithology journals
