= Wilson Ornithological Society =

US-based learned society

- Formation: December 1888; 137 years ago
- Type: Nonprofit
- Tax ID no.: 37-6026846
- Legal status: 501(c)(3)
- Location: United States
- Products: Wilson Journal of Ornithology
- President: Timothy J. O’Connell
- Website: wilsonsociety.org
- Formerly called: Young Ornithologists’ Association; Wilson Ornithological Chapter of the Agassiz Association; Wilson Ornithological Club

The Wilson Ornithological Society (WOS) is an ornithological organization that was formally established in 1886 as the Wilson Ornithological Chapter of the Agassiz Association. It is based at the Museum of Zoology, University of Michigan, Ann Arbor, United States. It was named after Alexander Wilson, a prominent early American ornithologist. The name of the group later evolved through being generally known as the Wilson Ornithological Club (or just the Wilson Club) until it became the WOS in 1955. It publishes the Wilson Journal of Ornithology (previously the Wilson Bulletin). It is a member of the Ornithological Council.

== Awards ==
The premier award made by WOS is the Margaret Morse Nice Medal, first awarded in 1997, commemorating notable ornithologist Margaret Morse Nice. The recipient gives the Plenary lecture at the WOS Annual Meeting. Additional awards from WOS are William and Nancy Klamm Service Award, Edwards Prize, Olson Prize, Early Professional Avian Conservation and Community Impact Award, and Student Presentation Awards (Alexander Wilson Prize, Lynds Jones Prize, and Nancy Klamm Undergraduate Presentation Awards).
