= Cooper Ornithological Society =

American ornithological society

The Cooper Ornithological Society (COS), formerly the Cooper Ornithological Club, was an American ornithological society. It was founded in 1893 in California and operated until 2016. Its name commemorated James Graham Cooper, an early California biologist. It published the ornithological journal The Condor and the monograph series Studies in Avian Biology (formerly Pacific Coast Avifauna). It presented the annual Loye and Alden Miller Research Award, which is given for lifetime achievement in ornithological research and was a member of the Ornithological Council.

The aims of the Cooper Ornithological Society were the scientific study of birds, the dissemination of ornithological knowledge, the encouragement and spread of interest in the study of birds, and the conservation of birds and wildlife in general.

In October 2016 the Cooper Ornithological Society merged with the American Ornithologists' Union to form the American Ornithological Society, based in Chicago, Illinois. The combined society continues to present the Loye and Alden Miller Research Award.
