= Hochbaum =

Hochbaum is a surname. Notable people with the surname include:

- Dorit S. Hochbaum, American mathematician and professor
- Friedrich Hochbaum (1894–1955), German general
- Tama Hochbaum (born 1953), American artist and photographer
- Werner Hochbaum (1899–1946), German screenwriter, film producer and director
- Hans Albert Hochbaum (1911–1988), American artist, writer and scientist
- Robert Hochbaum (born 1954), German politician
