= D. Frank McKinney =

Frank McKinney
- Born: 23 October 1928; Ballymena, Northern Ireland
- Died: 12 June 2001 (aged 72); Saint Paul, Minnesota
- Education: University of Oxford; University of Bristol
- Awards: Brewster Medal (1994)
- Scientific career
- Fields: Avian ethology
- Workplaces: Delta Waterfowl Foundation (Manitoba); University of Minnesota

David Frank McKinney (cited as Frank McKinney) (1928–2001) was a British-born ornithologist and ethologist, who worked in Canada and the USA and specialized in the social behavior of waterfowl.

== Biography ==
Frank McKinney graduated in 1949 with a bachelor's degree in zoology from the University of Oxford. He received his PhD in 1953 from the University of Bristol. His 227-page doctoral dissertation is titled "Studies of the behaviour of the Anatidae". As a postdoc in 1953 he worked with Nikolaas Tinbergen at the Wildfowl & Wetlands Trust in Slimbridge. From 1953 to 1963 he worked as a deputy director at the Delta Waterfowl Research Center in Manitoba. In 1963 he moved to the James Ford Bell Museum of Natural History in Minneapolis. He was appointed a curator for ethology and became a professor in the Faculty of Ecology, Evolution and Behavioral Science at the University of Minnesota. He held both positions until his retirement in 2000.

In the 1950s and 1960s, his research focused on the macroevolutionary aspects of social signals and other behavior patterns in ducks. The 1972 book "Sexual Selection and the Descent of Man: The Darwinian Pivot" edited by Bernard Grant Campbell (1930-2017) stimulated McKinney's interest in gender conflict and raised his doubts about older theories of pair bonding. McKinney changed his thinking on "three-bird-chase" behavior, as well as the focus of his research. During the last 20 years of his career, his research dealt with sperm competition, partner switching, and related topics.

His most important publications include "Behavioral Specializations for River Life in the African Black Duck (Anas sparsa Eyton)" (1978), "Rape Among Mallards" (1979), "Forced Copulation in Captive Mallards I. Fertilization of Eggs" (1980), "Forced copulation in captive mallards (Anas platyrhynchos): II. Temporal factors" from 1982 and "Forced Copulation in Captive Mallards III. Sperm Competition" (1983). At the University of Minnesota, he lectured on 48 different academic topics. As a professor, he supervised more than 30 students for MS or PhD theses. He served on more than 150 PhD He supervised almost 50 undergraduate research projects on animal behavior, including fish, iguanas, and primates.

He was elected in 1975 a Fellow of the American Ornithologists’ Union (A.O.U.) and in 1994 was awarded the A.O.U.'s Brewster Medal for his research on the social behavior of waterfowl. He was personally acquainted with all of the most important ethologists in the decades of the 20th century after WW II.

In 1963 McKinney married D. Meryl Morris (1924–2007). When he retired in 2000, he intended to write a comprehensive book on the social behavior of ducks. However, he suffered a severe heart attack on Christmas Day of 2000. After he slowly recovered, he and his wife wanted to move to another house to make life easier. While on an errand to get packing boxes, he suffered a second heart attack and quickly died, leaving Meryl McKinney a widow after 38 years of marriage.

== Selected publications ==
- "An Observation on Redhead Parasitism" (PDF). The Wilson Bulletin. 66 (2): 146–148. 1954.
- McKinney, F. (1961). "An analysis of the displays of the European eider Somateria mollissima mollissima (Linnaeus) and the Pacific eider Somateria mollissima v. nigra Bonaparte". Behaviour. Supplement. 7 (7): 111–125. JSTOR 30039137.
- McKinney, F. (1965). "The Spring Behavior and Wild Steller Eiders" (PDF). The Condor. 67 (4): 273–290. doi:10.2307/1365576. JSTOR 1365576.
- "Spacing and chasing in breeding ducks". The Wildfowl Trust. 16: 92–106. 1965.
- "The Displays of the American Green-Winged Teal" (PDF). The Wilson Bulletin. 77 (2): 112–121. 1965.
- "Displays of four species of Blue-winged Ducks". Living Bird. 9: 29–64. 1970. ISSN 0459-6137.
- Farner, Donald Sankey, ed. (1973). "Ecoethologigical aspects of reproduction by F. McKinney". Breeding biology of birds : proceedings. Washington: National Academy of Sciences. pp. 6–21. ISBN 0-309-02109-X.
- Baerends, Gerard; Beer, Colin; Manning, Aubrey, eds. (1976). "The Evolution of duck displays by F. McKinney". Function and Evolution in Behaviour: Essays in Honour of Professor Niko Tinbergen. Oxford: Oxford University Press. pp. 331–357. ISBN 0-19-857382-0.
- Rosenblatt, Jay Seth; Hinde, Robert Aubrey; Beer, Colin; Busnel, Marie-Claire, eds. (1978). "Comparative Approaches to Social Behavior in Closely Related Species of Birds by F. McKinney". Advances in the Study of Behavior. Vol. 8. New York: Academic Press. pp. 1–38. doi:10.1016/S0065-3454(08)60130-8. ISBN 0-12-004508-7.
- with Walter Roy Siegfried, Irvin Joseph Ball, Jr., & Peter Graham Hyde Frost (1978). "Behavioral Specializations for River Life in the African Black Duck (Anas sparsa Eyton)". Zeitschrift für Tierpsychologie. 48 (4): 349–400. doi:10.1111/j.1439-0310.1978.tb00266.x.
- with Julie Barrett & Scott Richard Derrickson (1979). "Rape Among Mallards". Science. 201 (4352): 281–282. doi:10.1126/science.201.4352.281. PMID 17778661.
- with Peter Graham Hyde Frost, Irvin Joseph Ball Jr., & Walter Roy Siegfried (1979). "Sex Ratios, Morphology and Growth of the African Black Duck". Ostrich. 50 (4): 220–233. Bibcode:1979Ostri..50..220F. doi:10.1080/00306525.1979.9634117.
- with Kimberly Ming Tak Cheng, & Jeffrey Thomas Burns (1980). "Forced Copulation in Captive Mallards I. Fertilization of Eggs" (PDF). The Auk. 97 (4): 875–879.
- with Kimberly Ming Tak Cheng & Jeffrey Thomas Burns (1982). "Forced copulation in captive mallards (Anas platyrhynchos): II. Temporal factors" (PDF). Animal Behaviour. 30 (3): 695–699. doi:10.1016/S0003-3472(82)80140-1. S2CID 54298162.
- with Pierre Mineau & Scott Richard Derrickson (1983). "Forced Copulation in Waterfowl". Behaviour. 86 (3/4): 250–294. doi:10.1163/156853983X00390. JSTOR 4534287.
- with Kimberly Ming Tak Cheng & Jeffrey Thomas Burns (1983). "Forced Copulation in Captive Mallards III. Sperm Competition" (PDF). The Auk. 100 (2): 302–310. doi:10.1093/auk/100.2.302.
- with Kimberly Ming Tak Cheng, & David John Bruggers (1984). "Sperm Competition in Apparently Monogamous Birds". In Smith, Robert Lincoln (ed.). Sperm Competition and the Evolution of Avian Mating Systems. Orlando, Florida/London: Academic Press Inc. pp. 523–545. ISBN 0-12-412398-8. 2012 pbk reprint
- Rubinstein, Daniel Ian; Wrangham, Richard Walter, eds. (1984). "Ecological Factors Influencing the Social Systems of Migratory Dabbling Ducks by F. McKinney". Ecological Aspects of Social Evolution: Birds and Mammals. Princeton, N.J.: Princeton University Press. pp. 53–171. ISBN 0-691-08440-8. 2014 pbk reprint
- Gowaty, Patricia Adair; Mock, Douglas Wayne, eds. (1985). "Chapter 6. Primary and Secondary Male Reproductive Strategies of Dabbling Ducks by F. McKinney" (PDF). Avian Monogamy (PDF). Ornithological Monographs. Vol. 37. pp. 68–82.
- with Gwen Brewer (1989). "Parental Attendance and Brood Care in Four Argentine Dabbling Ducks" (PDF). The Condor. 91 (1): 131–138. doi:10.2307/1368156. JSTOR 1368156.
- with Lisa Guminski Sorenson & Mark Hart (1990). "Multiple Functions of Courtship Displays in Dabbling Ducks (Anatini)" (PDF). The Auk. 107 (2): 189–191.
- Bell, Ben Dean, ed. (1991). "Male parental care in Southern Hemisphere dabbling ducks by F. McKinney". Acta XX Congressus Internationalis Ornithologici: Christchurch, New Zealand, 2–9 December 1990. Wellington, New Zealand: Ornithological Congress Trust Board. pp. 868–875. ISBN 0-9597975-3-X.
- Batt, Bruce Duncan John; Afton, Alan Daynne; Anderson, Michael George; Ankney, Claude Davison; Johnson, Douglas Hamilton; Kadlec, John Adolph; Krapu, Gary Lee, eds. (1992). "Courtship, pair formation, and signal systems by F. McKinney". Ecology and Management of Breeding Waterfowl. Minneapolis, London: University of Minnesota Press. pp. 214–250. ISBN 0-8166-6832-9.
- with Susan Evarts (1998). "Chapter 8. Sexual Coercion in Waterfowl and Other Birds". In Parker, Patricia Gail; Burley, Nancy Tyler (eds.). Avian Reproductive Tactics: Female and Male Perspectives (PDF). Ornithological Monographs. American Ornithologists' Union. pp. 163–195. doi:10.2307/40166723. JSTOR 40166723.
