= Allan Baker =

Allan Baker may refer to:

- Allan Baker (born 1948), Australian rapist and double murderer
- Allan J. Baker (1943–2014), Canadian ornithologist
