= Adriaan Joseph van Rossem =

American ornithologist

- Born: December 17, 1892; Chicago, Illinois, United States
- Died: September 4, 1949 (aged 56); Los Angeles, California, United States
- Awards: Brewster Medal
- Scientific career
- Fields: Ornithology

Adriaan Joseph van Rossem (December 17, 1892 – September 4, 1949) was an American ornithologist of Dutch ancestry. Born in Chicago, Van Rossem came from an affluent family where his father died very early in his life. Van Rossem went on to attend both public and private schools. In his teens he became influenced by Joseph Grinnell who led him into ornithology. He later did much work with Donald Ryder Dickey and shared the 1941 Brewster Medal with him. He was curator of the Donald Ryder Dickey Collection (first housed at the California Institute of Technology and later at the University of California Los Angeles) from 1912 until his death in 1949. He was a 1939 Guggenheim Fellow and received an honorary doctorate from Occidental College in 1948.
