= Delta Marsh =

Marsh in Manitoba, Canada

Coordinates: 50°11′55″N 98°12′17″W

Designations

Ramsar Wetland
- Official name: Delta Marsh
- Designated: 24 May 1982
- Reference no.: 238

Location of Delta Marsh in Manitoba

Delta Marsh consists of an extensive open marsh located near the south shore of Lake Manitoba, approximately 24 km north of the town of Portage la Prairie, Manitoba. The marsh extends for nearly 30 km along the shore of the lake, and has a breadth of up to 4 km. The marsh consists of a network of interconnected shallow bays separated from Lake Manitoba by a wooded barrier dune ridge of 300m to 600m width.

Despite its name, Delta Marsh is no longer a river delta. However, it was originally the delta of the Assiniboine River, which flowed into Lake Manitoba from the southwest until approximately 2,500 years ago. (The current course of the river continues east past Lake Manitoba until it intersects the Red River in Winnipeg).

The marsh is situated in the northern part of the Rural Municipality of Portage la Prairie.

== Flora and fauna ==
Delta Marsh is a wildlife breeding and migration staging area of major importance. Waterfowl and songbirds are especially abundant in the marsh, either as breeding residents or seasonal migrants. The wooded dune ridge is also migratory pathway for passerine birds.

Hunting is permitted in a portion of the marsh in the autumn by sportsmen, and by First Nations year round, under the auspices of the Delta Marsh Wildlife Management Area, which controls hunting pressure and safeguards the marsh environment. Canada geese, mallard ducks, and snow geese are the three primary bird species hunted, both in the marsh itself and in nearby grain fields, where these birds feed on autumn days. Of these, Canada geese and mallards breed in the marsh, while snow geese are strictly seasonal migrants. Hunting of waterfowl contributes in a significant way to the local economy. Other game, including white-tailed deer, are also hunted in and around the marsh, and beaver and other fur bearing mammals are commercially trapped.

== Climate ==
Climate data for Delta Marsh CS (1981-2010)
Month	Jan	Feb	Mar	Apr	May	Jun	Jul	Aug	Sep	Oct	Nov	Dec	Year
Record high °C (°F)	7.5 (45.5)	11.5 (52.7)	18.3 (64.9)	34 (93)	37.5 (99.5)	37 (99)	36 (97)	37.5 (99.5)	35 (95)	31 (88)	22.8 (73.0)	11.1 (52.0)	37.5 (99.5)
Mean daily maximum °C (°F)	−10.7 (12.7)	−7.6 (18.3)	−0.8 (30.6)	8.6 (47.5)	16.8 (62.2)	22.4 (72.3)	25.1 (77.2)	24.2 (75.6)	18.2 (64.8)	10.4 (50.7)	−0.2 (31.6)	−8.1 (17.4)	8.2 (46.8)
Daily mean °C (°F)	−16.2 (2.8)	−13.6 (7.5)	−6.4 (20.5)	2.9 (37.2)	10.9 (51.6)	16.8 (62.2)	19.3 (66.7)	18.1 (64.6)	12.3 (54.1)	4.9 (40.8)	−4.9 (23.2)	−13.0 (8.6)	2.6 (36.7)
Mean daily minimum °C (°F)	−21.7 (−7.1)	−19.4 (−2.9)	−11.9 (10.6)	−2.9 (26.8)	4.9 (40.8)	11.2 (52.2)	13.5 (56.3)	11.9 (53.4)	6.3 (43.3)	−0.7 (30.7)	−9.5 (14.9)	−17.8 (0.0)	−3.0 (26.6)
Record low °C (°F)	−41 (−42)	−41.5 (−42.7)	−36.7 (−34.1)	−29.5 (−21.1)	−8.5 (16.7)	−1 (30)	4.5 (40.1)	−0.5 (31.1)	−7.1 (19.2)	−20.5 (−4.9)	−36 (−33)	−37.2 (−35.0)	−41.5 (−42.7)
Average precipitation mm (inches)	22.3 (0.88)	16.0 (0.63)	27.3 (1.07)	31.9 (1.26)	57.3 (2.26)	86.4 (3.40)	76.6 (3.02)	59.8 (2.35)	50.4 (1.98)	38.1 (1.50)	31.3 (1.23)	28.4 (1.12)	525.7 (20.70)
Source: Environment Canada

== Human use ==
Much of the marsh is still quite pristine. The barrier dune ridge has however been settled with cottages, and Delta Beach, on the lake-side of the ridge, is a popular swimming beach in summer. The access road to the beach does however cross the marsh along a relatively dry path, and so disruption to the marsh habitat is minimal.

A more obvious man-made disruption of the marsh is the Assiniboine River Floodway, which crosses the marsh near its west end. This floodway diverts Assiniboine River floodwater northwards from just upstream of the town of Portage la Prairie directly into Lake Manitoba, thus protecting the town and the city of Winnipeg from spring flooding. Controversy continues to surround the issue of the environmental impact of the floodway upon the marsh.

The Delta Waterfowl Research Station was established in 1938 east of Delta Beach to carry out waterfowl research. In 1966, the University of Manitoba leased lands at the west end of the marsh from the Province of Manitoba and developed the Delta Marsh Field Station (University of Manitoba) as a teaching and research centre. The field station closed in 2011 after massive flooding of Lake Manitoba caused some damage to the buildings. The Delta Waterfowl Foundation is an international research and conservation organization inspired by and named for Delta Marsh. Delta Marsh is listed as a Wetland of International Importance under the Ramsar Convention.

== Gallery ==
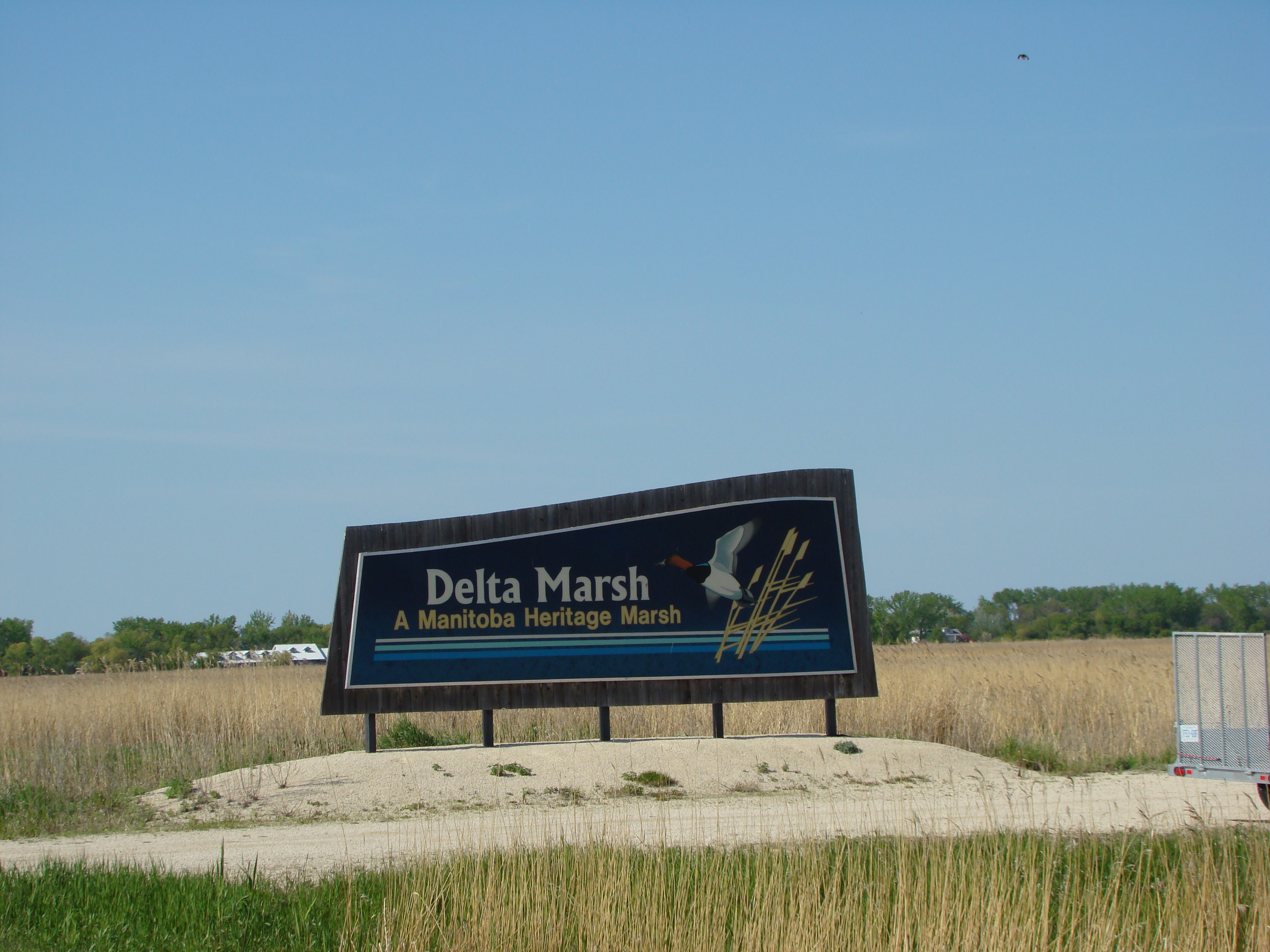
Delta Marsh

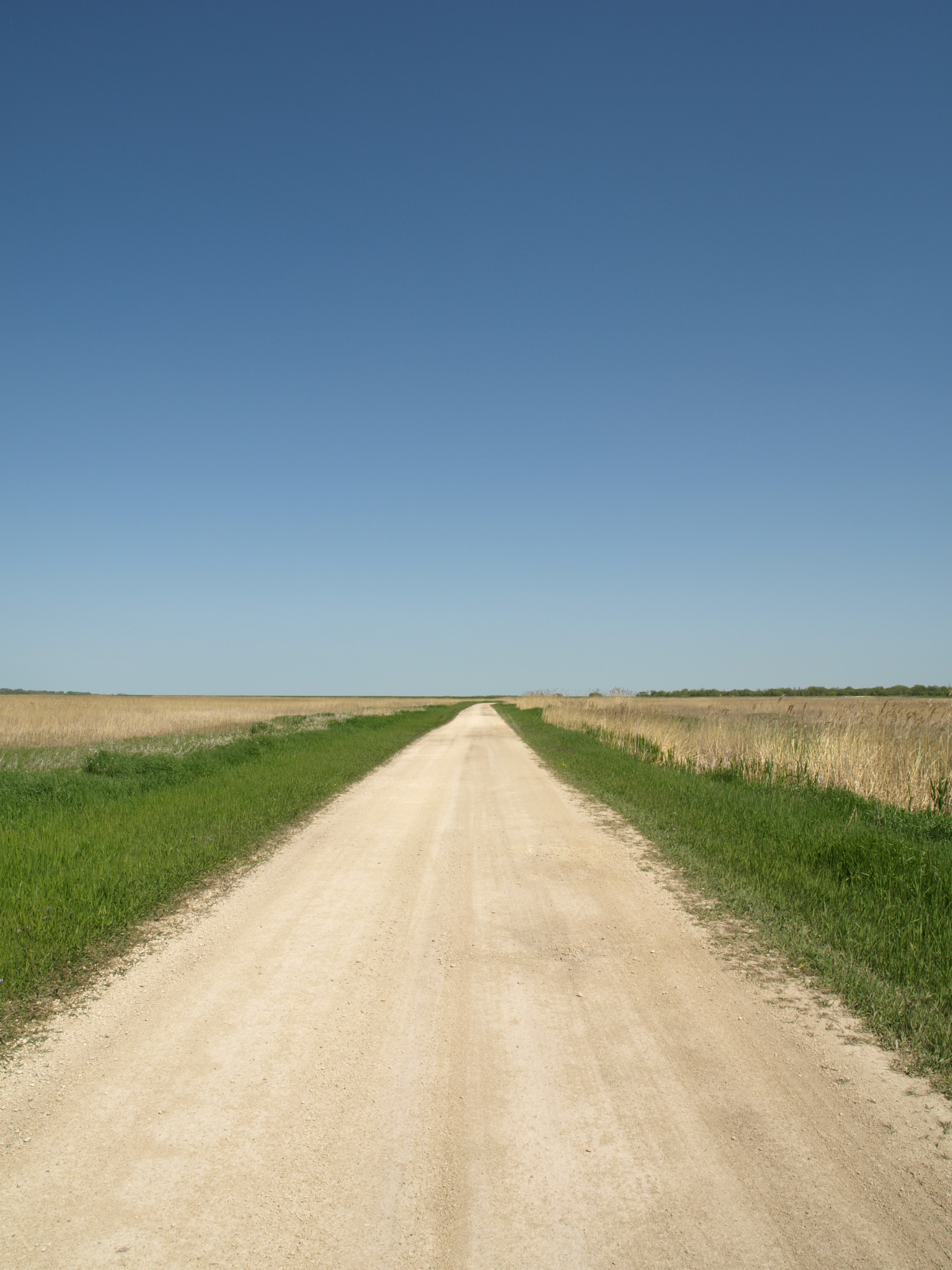
Delta Marsh

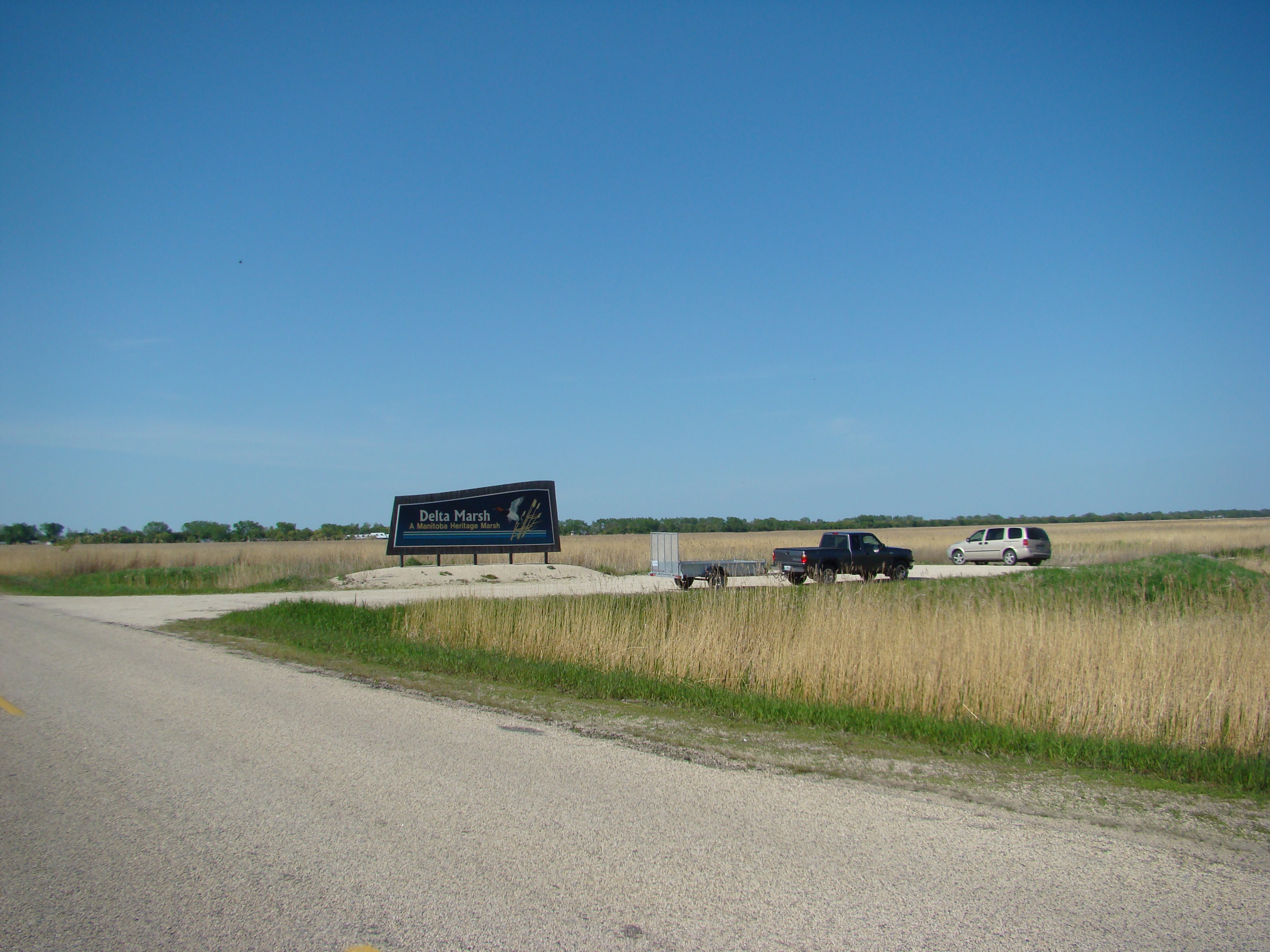
Delta Marsh

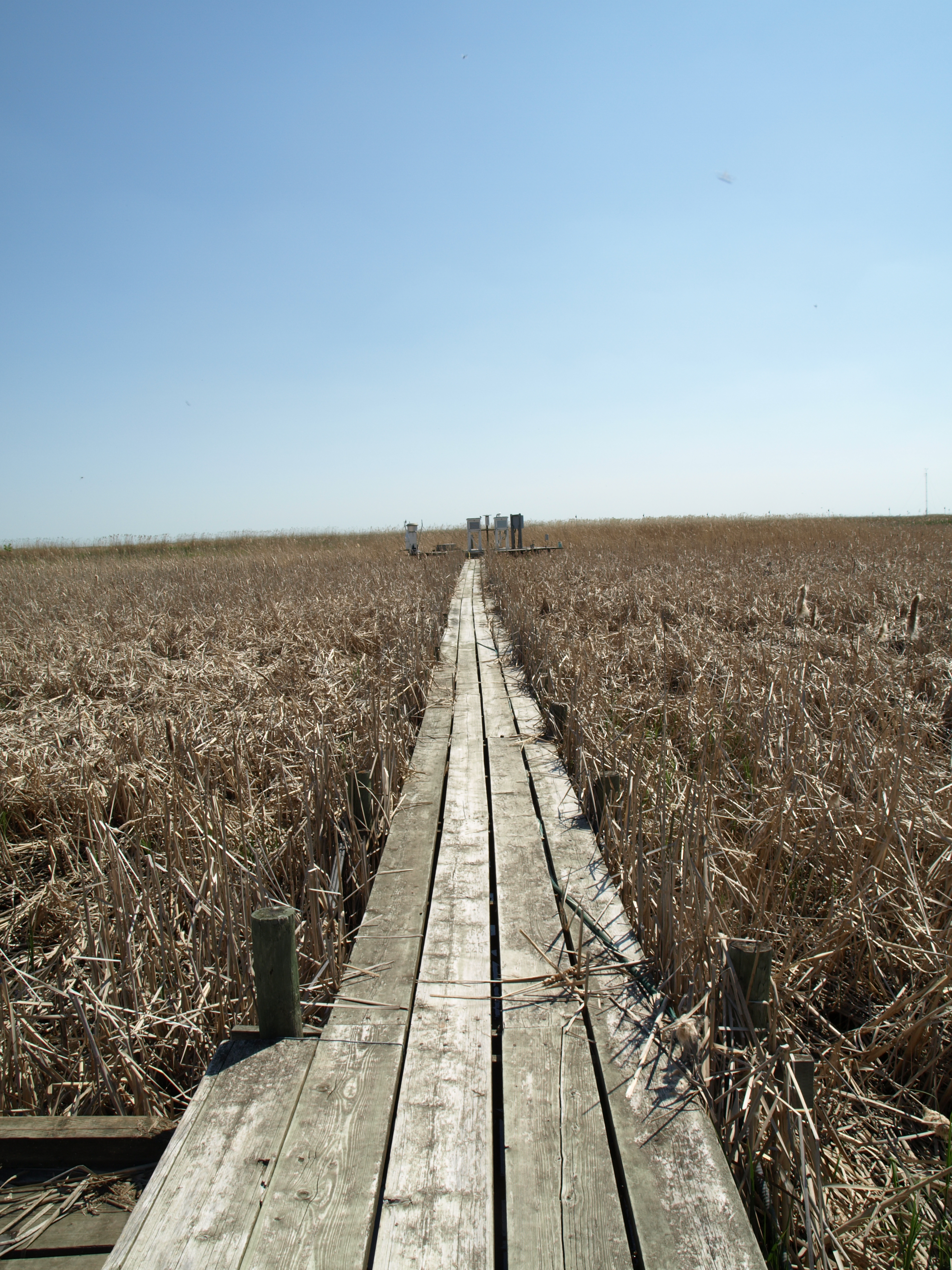
Delta Marsh

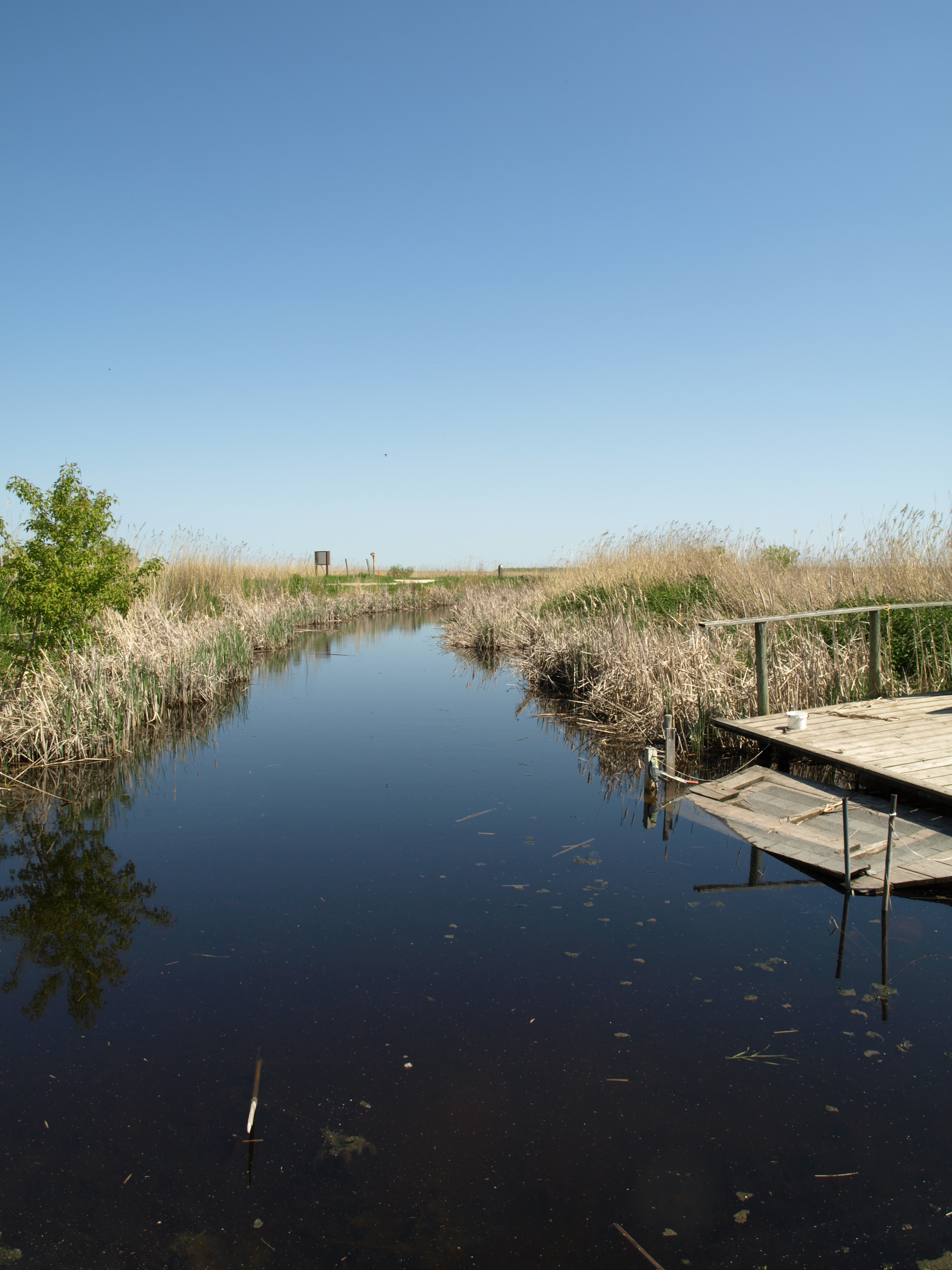
Delta Marsh

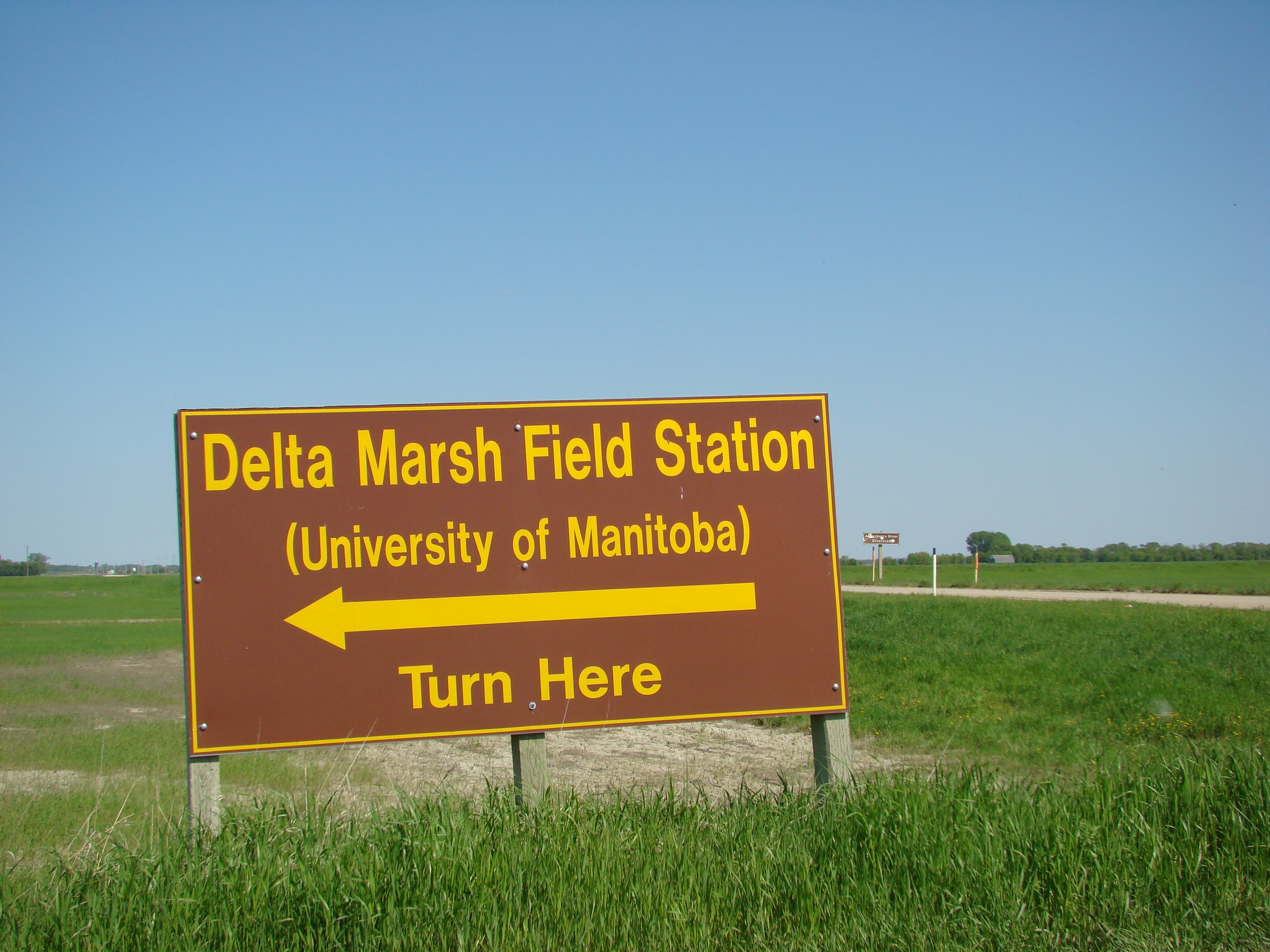
Delta Marsh Field Station

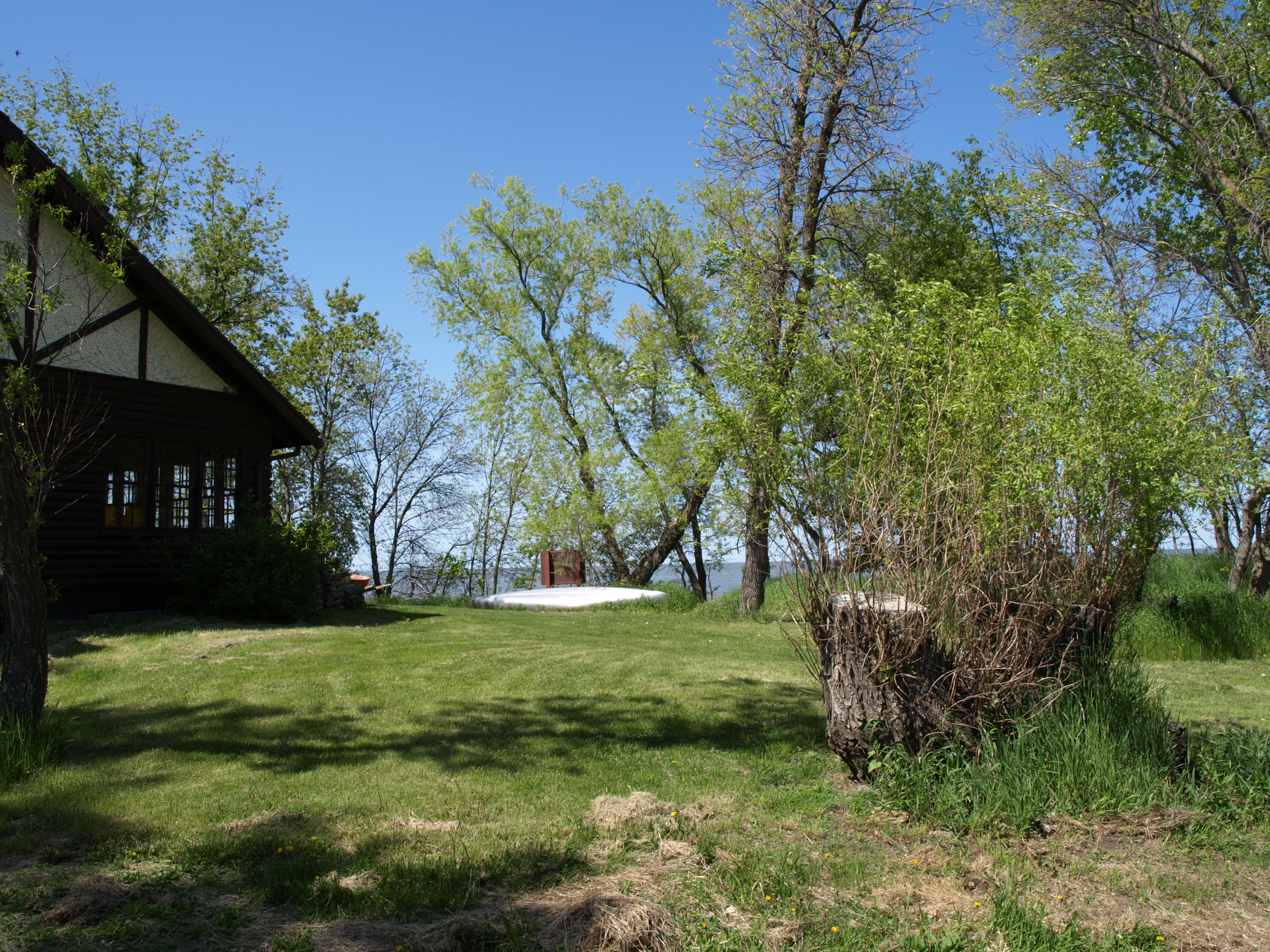
Delta Marsh Field Station

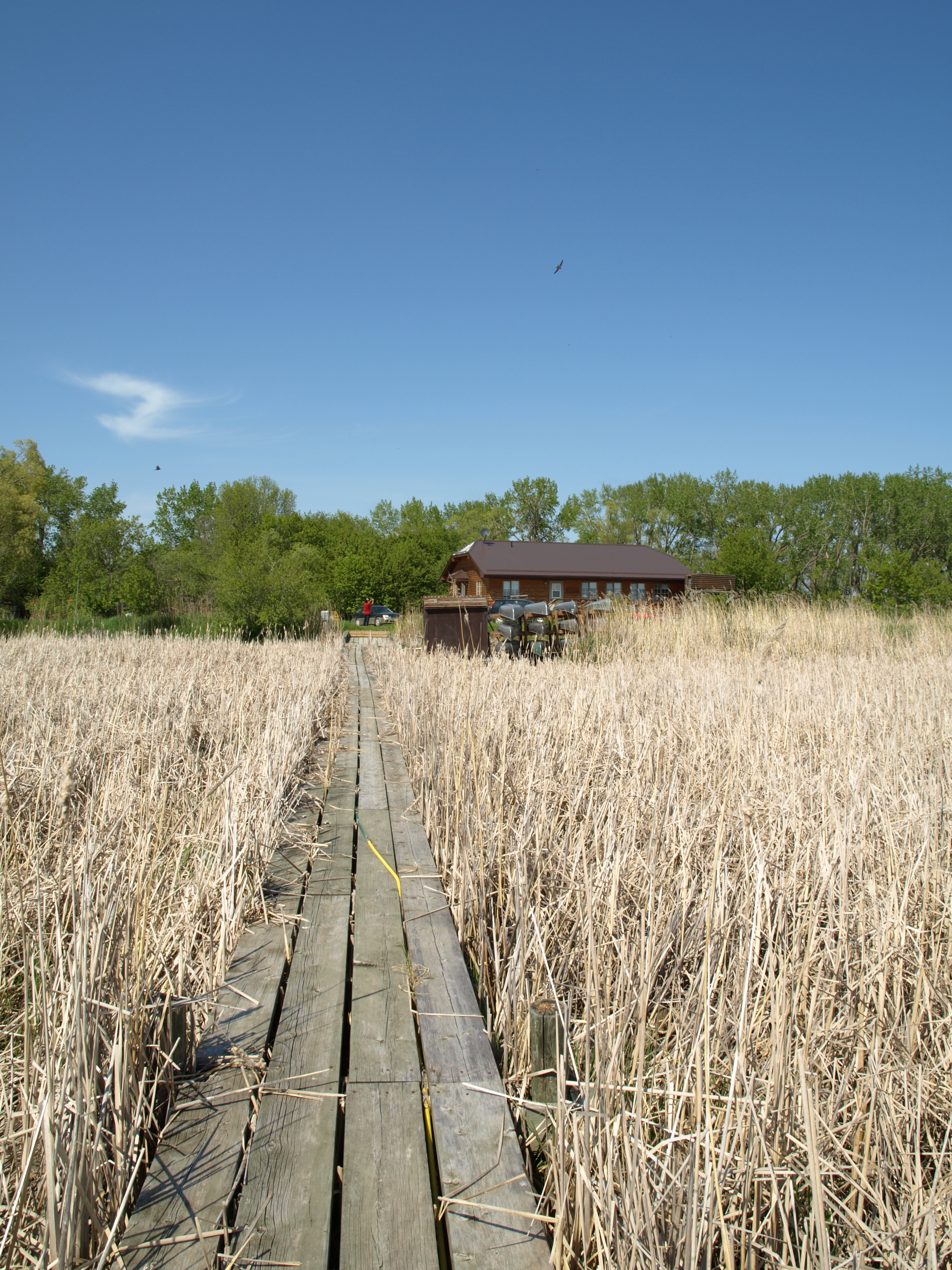
Delta Marsh Field Station

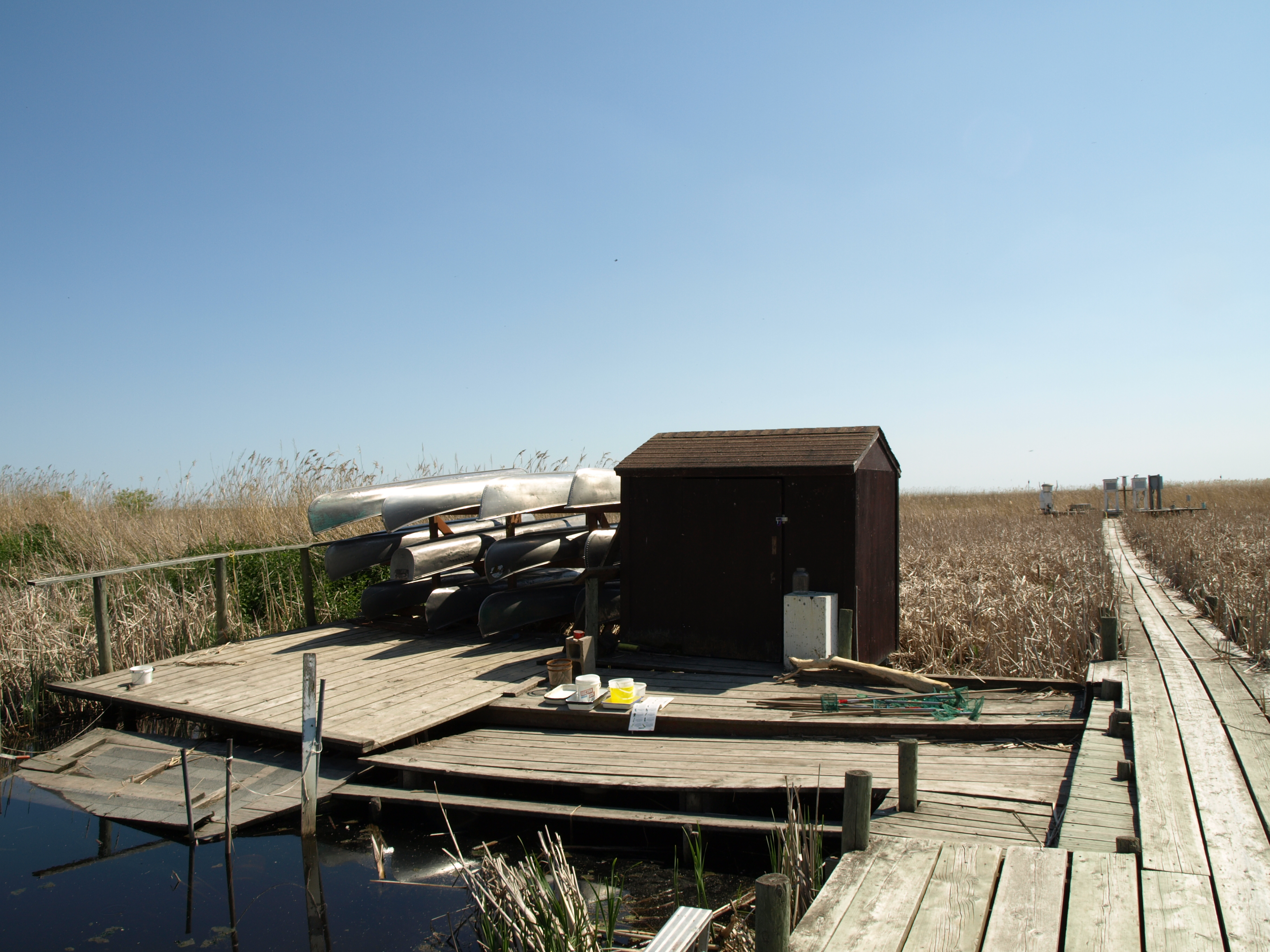
Delta Marsh Field Station

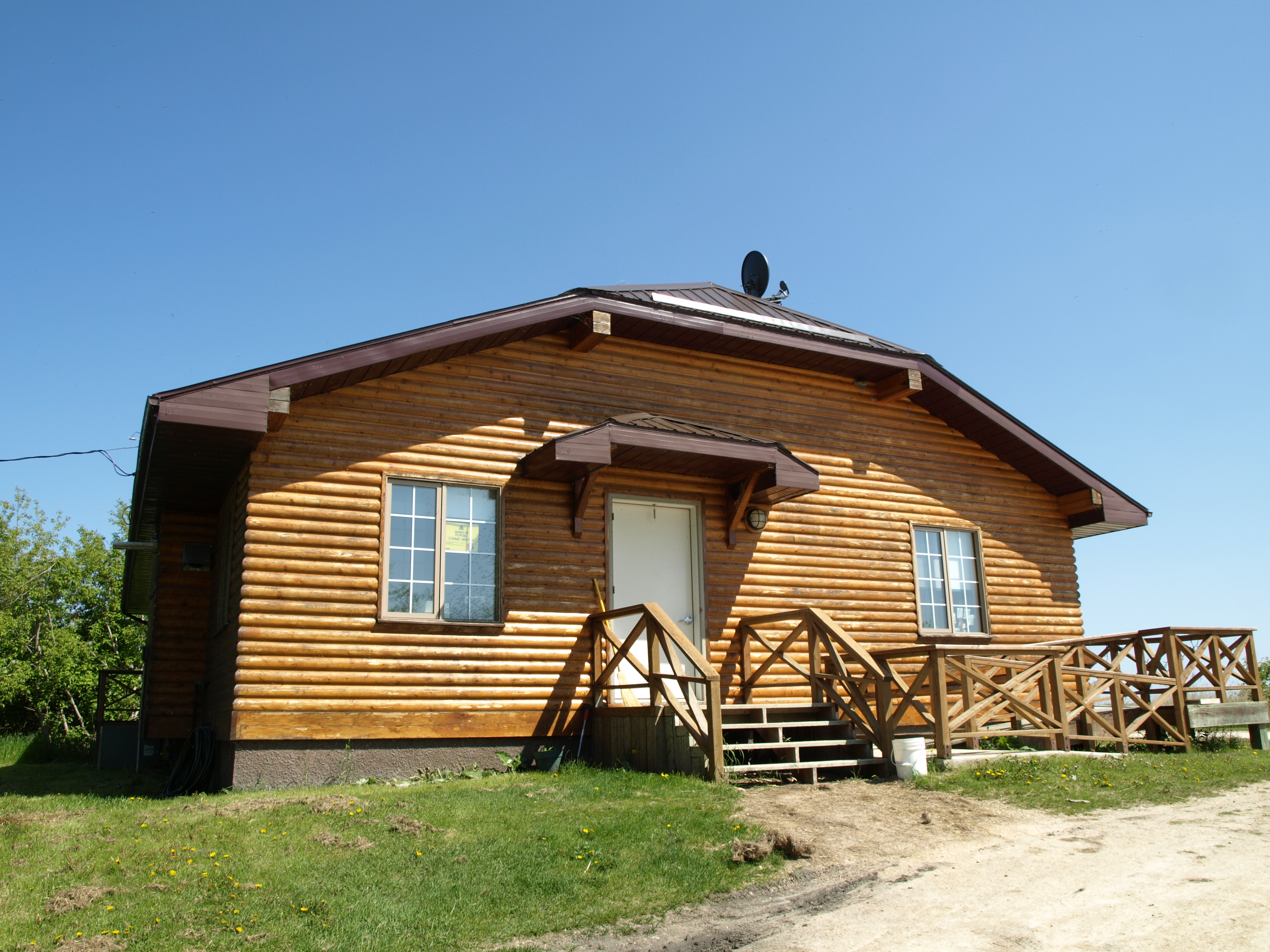
Delta Marsh Field Station

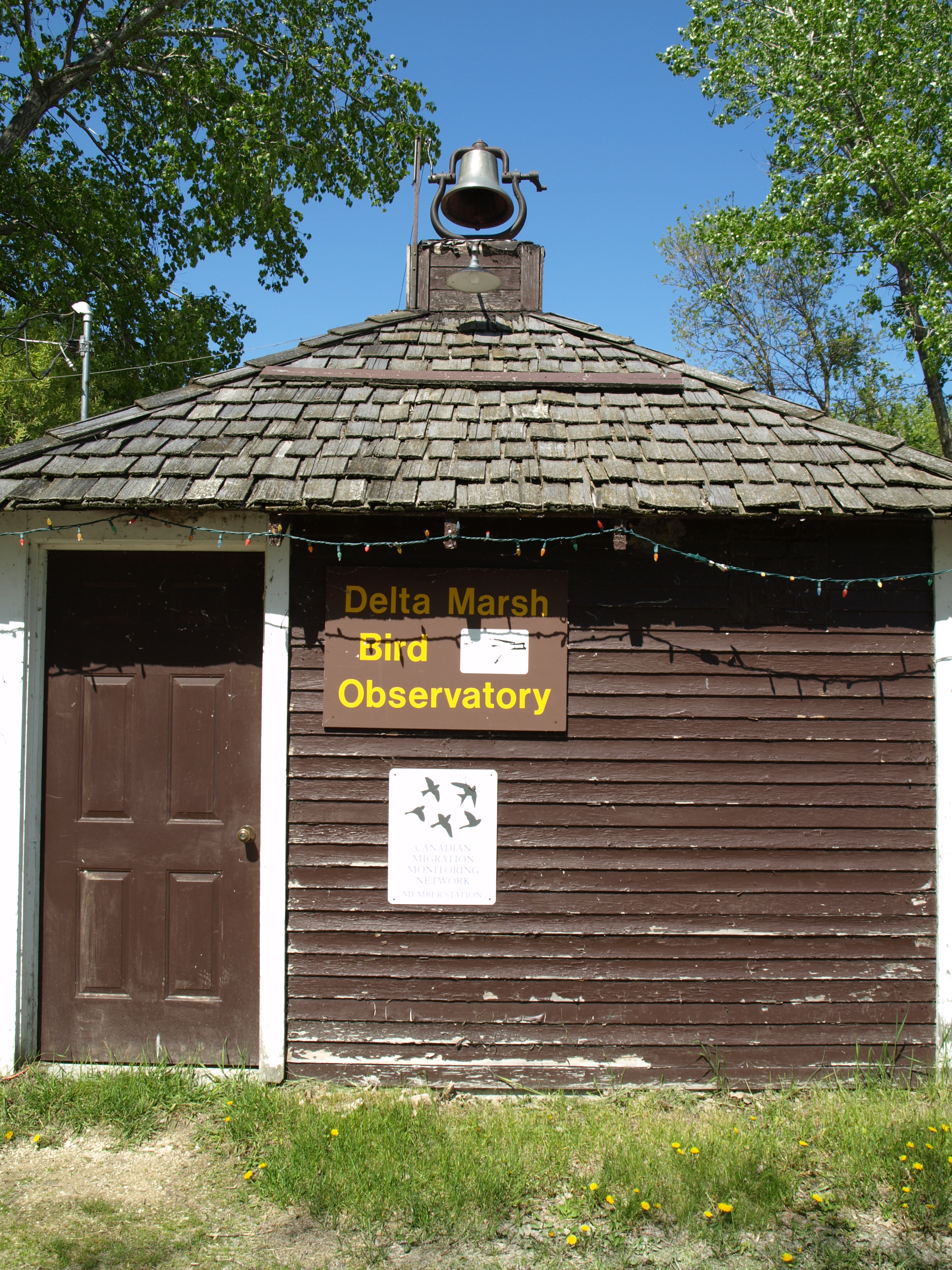
Delta Marsh Field Station

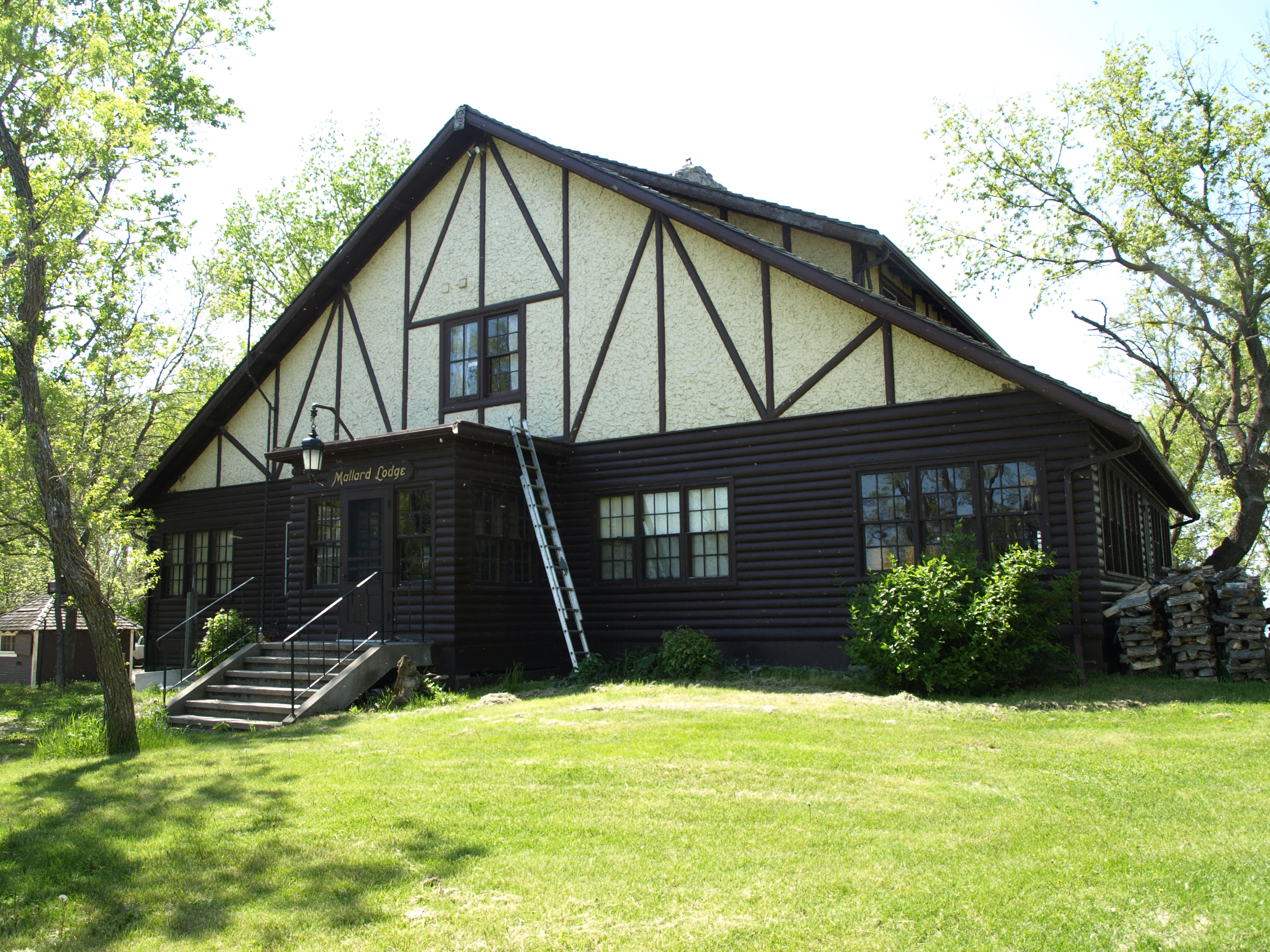
Delta Marsh Field Station

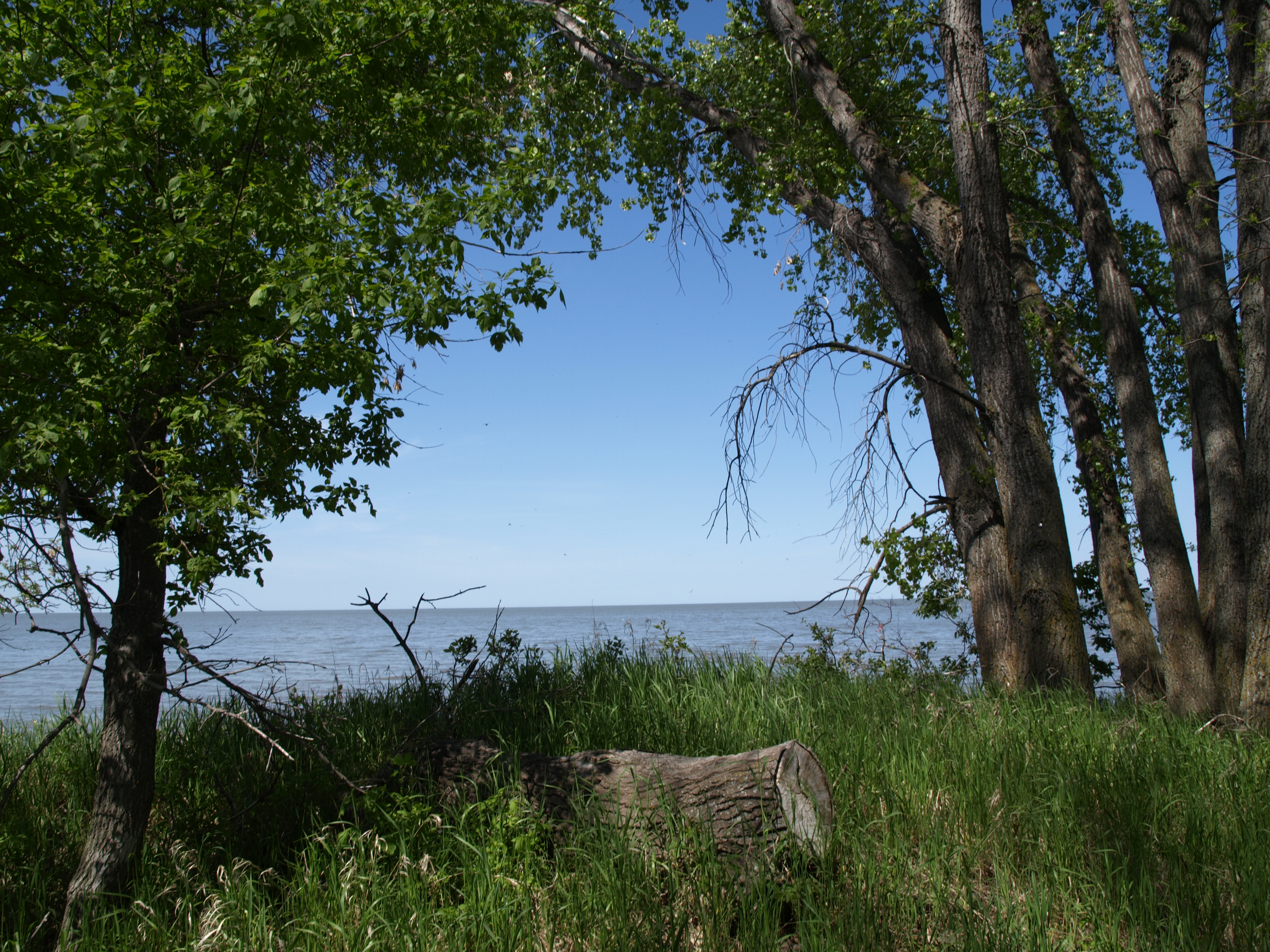
Lake Manitoba From Delta Marsh Field Station
