= James Roger King =

American ornithologist

- Born: March 11, 1927; San Jose, California, US
- Died: April 7, 1991 (aged 64); Pullman, Washington, US
- Education: San Jose State College; Washington State University
- Known for: co-editorship of series Avian Biology 1971–1993; 9 vols., Academic Press
- Awards: Brewster Medal (1974)
- Scientific career
- Workplaces: Washington State University
- Academic advisors: Donald S. Farner

James Roger King (1927–1991) was an American ornithologist, specializing in avian physiology.

== Biography ==
After graduating from Santa Clara High School, King served in the U.S. Army from 1945 to 1946. He then matriculated at San Jose State College, where he graduated in 1950 with a B.A. in biological and physical sciences. King became a graduate student at Washington State College, where he graduated in zoology with an M.A. in 1953 and a Ph.D. in 1957. His doctoral thesis, supervised by Donald S. Farner, dealt with "premigratory adiposity in the White-crowned Sparrow". From 1957 to 1960 King was an assistant professor in experimental biology at the University of Utah. In the zoology department Washington State University, he was from 1960 to 1962 an assistant professor, from 1962 to 1967 an associate professor, and from 1967 until his death a full professor. He was the chair of the department from 1972 to 1978.

King was the editor-in-chief of The Condor from 1965 to 1968 and, for the last 20 years of his life, was the co-editor, with Donald S. Farner, of the multi-volume series Avian Biology. Washington State University's Department of Zoology annually awards a James R. King Memorial Fellowship for graduate students.

He married Eleanor Porter (1928–2006) in 1950. Upon his death he was survived by his widow, a son, two daughters, and a granddaughter.

== Awards and honors ==
- 1969 — Guggenheim Fellowship
- 1974 — Brewster Medal of the American Ornithologists' Union
- 1977–1978 — President of the Council of the Cooper Ornithological Society
- 1978 — Fellow of the American Association for the Advancement of Science
- 1979 — Washington State University Distinguished Faculty Award
- 1980–1982 — President of the American Ornithologists' Union

== Selected publications ==
- Farner, Donald S.; Mewaldt, L. R.; King, James R. (1954). "The diurnal activity patterns of caged migratory white-crowned sparrows in late winter and spring". Journal of Comparative and Physiological Psychology. 47 (2): 148–153. doi:10.1037/h0057401. PMID 13152231.
- King, James R. (1955). "Notes on the Life History of Traill's Flycatcher (Empidonax traillii) in Southeastern Washington". The Auk. 72 (2): 148–173. doi:10.2307/4081421. JSTOR 4081421.
- King, J. R.; Farner, D. S. (1956). "Bioenergetic Basis of Light-induced Fat Deposition in the White-crowned Sparrow". Experimental Biology and Medicine. 93 (2): 354–359. doi:10.3181/00379727-93-22755. PMID 13379510. S2CID 35714571.
- King, James R.; Mewaldt, Richard; Farner, Donald S. (1960). "The Duration of Postnuptial Metabolic Refractoriness in the White-Crowned Sparrow". The Auk. 77 (1): 89–92. doi:10.2307/4082396. JSTOR 4082396.
- King, James R.; Farner, Donald S. (1959). "Premigratory Changes in Body Weight and Fat in Wild and Captive Male White-Crowned Sparrows". The Condor. 61 (5): 315–324. doi:10.2307/1365124. JSTOR 1365124.
- Matsuo, Shinichi; Vitums, Arturs; King, James R.; Farner, Donald S. (1969). "Light-microscope studies of the cytology of the adenohypophysis of the white-crowned sparrow, Zonotrichia leucophrys gambelii". Zeitschrift für Zellforschung und Mikroskopische Anatomie. 95 (1): 143–176. doi:10.1007/BF00319274. PMID 4183639. S2CID 20241498. 1969
- King, James R. (2010). "Variation in the Song of the Rufous-Collared Sparrow, Zonotrichia capensis, in Northwestern Argentina". Zeitschrift für Tierpsychologie. 30 (4): 344–373. doi:10.1111/j.1439-0310.1972.tb00863.x. 1972
- Kern, Michael D.; De Graw, William A.; King, James R. (1972). "Effects of gonadal hormones on the blood composition of white-crowned sparrows". General and Comparative Endocrinology. 18 (1): 43–53. doi:10.1016/0016-6480(72)90078-0. PMID 5009677.
- Kern, Michael D.; King, James R. (1972). "Testosterone-Induced Singing in Female White-Crowned Sparrows". The Condor. 74 (2): 204–209. doi:10.2307/1366289. JSTOR 1366289.
- Webb, D.R.; King, J.R. (1983). "Heat-transfer relations of avian nestlings". Journal of Thermal Biology. 8 (4): 301–310. Bibcode:1983JTBio...8..301W. doi:10.1016/0306-4565(83)90013-X.
- King, James R.; Murphy, Mary E. (1985). "Periods of Nutritional Stress in the Annual Cycles of Endotherms: Fact or Fiction?". American Zoologist. 25 (4): 955–964. doi:10.1093/icb/25.4.955.
- Murphy, Mary E.; King, James R. (1986). "Composition and Quantity of Feather Sheaths Produced by White-Crowned Sparrows during the Postnuptial Molt". The Auk. 103 (4): 822–825. JSTOR 4087197.
- Webster, Marcus D.; King, James R. (1987). "Temperature and humidity dynamics of cutaneous and respiratory evaporation in pigeons, Columba livia". Journal of Comparative Physiology B. 157 (2): 253–260. doi:10.1007/BF00692370. PMID 3571575. S2CID 19375343.
- Murphy, Mary E.; King, James R. (1992). "Energy and Nutrient Use during Moult by White-Crowned Sparrows Zonotrichia leucophrys gambelii". Ornis Scandinavica (Scandinavian Journal of Ornithology). 23 (3): 304–313. doi:10.2307/3676654. JSTOR 3676654.

=== As editor ===
- Farner, Donald S.; King, James R.; Parkes, Kenneth C., eds. (2 December 2012). Avian Biology. Vol. 7. Academic Press. ISBN 978-0-323-14002-7; 1st edition, 1983
