= Patricia G. Parker =

American biologist

- Occupations: Evolutionary biologist; professor
- Title: Des Lee Professor of Zoological Studies
- Awards: Brewster Medal (2016)

Academic background
- Education: University of North Carolina at Chapel Hill (B.S., Ph.D.)

Patricia G. Parker is a North American evolutionary biologist who uses molecular techniques to assess social structures, particularly in avian populations. Her interests have shaped her research in disease transmission and population size, particularly in regard to bird conservation. She received her B.S. in Zoology in 1975 and her Ph.D. in Behavioral Ecology in 1984, both from the University of North Carolina at Chapel Hill. From 1991 to 2000, Parker was an Assistant and Associate Professor in the Department of Evolution, Ecology, and Organismal Biology at Ohio State University. From 2000 to 2022, she was the Des Lee Professor of Zoological Studies at the University of Missouri–St. Louis.

Parker's research focused on disease transmission in birds, their susceptibility and how they achieve protection from such diseases. Her efforts were in the context of conservation of birds in the Galapagos Islands. Parker's lab collaborated with the St. Louis Zoo's Wildcare Institute to further this research.

In 2016 she was awarded the Brewster Medal from the American Ornithologist's Union for her work as an author.

== Honors ==
- Fellow, Animal Behavior Society, 2003
- Fellow, American Association for the Advancement of Science, 2006
- Fellow, St. Louis Academy of Science, 2003 & 2006
- Inducted as Member, American Academy of Arts and Sciences, 2021

== Bibliography ==
- Whiteman, N. K.; Santiago-Alarcon, D.; Johnson, K. P.; Parker, P. G. (2004). "Differences in straggling rates between two genera of dove lice (Insecta: Phthiraptera) reinforce population genetic and cophylogenetic patterns". International Journal for Parasitology. 34 (10): 1113–1119. doi:10.1016/j.ijpara.2004.06.003. PMID 15380682.
- Santiago-Alarcon, D.; Outlaw, D. C.; Ricklefs, R. E.; Parker, P. G. (2010). "Phylogenetic relationships of haemosporidian parasites in New World Columbiformes, with emphasis on the endemic Galapagos dove". International Journal for Parasitology. 40 (4): 463–470. doi:10.1016/j.ijpara.2009.10.003. PMID 19854196.
- Levin, I. I.; Valkiūnas, G.; Santiago-Alarcon, D.; Cruz, L. L.; Iezhova, T. A.; O'Brien, S. L.; Hailer, F.; Dearborn, D.; Schreiber, E. A.; Fleischer, R. C.; Ricklefs, R. E.; Parker, P. G. (2011). "Hippoboscid-transmitted Haemoproteus parasites (Haemosporida) infect Galapagos Pelecaniform birds: Evidence from molecular and morphological studies, with a description of Haemoproteus iwa". International Journal for Parasitology. 41 (10): 1019–1027. doi:10.1016/j.ijpara.2011.03.014. PMID 21683082.
- Bataille, A.; Fournié, G.; Cruz, M.; Cedeño, V.; Parker, P. G.; Cunningham, A. A.; Goodman, S. J. (2012). "Host selection and parasite infection in Aedes taeniorhynchus, endemic disease vector in the Galápagos Islands". Infection, Genetics and Evolution. 12 (8): 1831–41. doi:10.1016/j.meegid.2012.07.019. PMID 22921730.
- Bollmer, J. L.; Kimball, R. T.; Whiteman, N. K.; Sarasola, J. H. N.; Parker, P. G. (2006). "Phylogeography of the Galápagos hawk (Buteo galapagoensis): A recent arrival to the Galápagos Islands". Molecular Phylogenetics and Evolution. 39 (1): 237–247. doi:10.1016/j.ympev.2005.11.014. PMID 16376110.
- Parker, P. G.; Tang-Martinez, Z. (2005). "Bateman Gradients in Field and Laboratory Studies: A Cautionary Tale". Integrative and Comparative Biology. 45 (5): 895–902. doi:10.1093/icb/45.5.895. PMID 21676840.
- Hoeck, P. E. A.; Bollmer, J. L.; Parker, P. G.; Keller, L. F. (2010). "Differentiation with drift: A spatio-temporal genetic analysis of Galapagos mockingbird populations (Mimus spp.)". Philosophical Transactions of the Royal Society B: Biological Sciences. 365 (1543): 1127–38. doi:10.1098/rstb.2009.0311. PMC 2830237. PMID 20194174.
- Hull, J. M.; Savage, W. K.; Bollmer, J. L.; Kimball, R. T.; Parker, P. G.; Whiteman, N. K.; Ernest, H. B. (2008). "On the origin of the Galápagos hawk: An examination of phenotypic differentiation and mitochondrial paraphyly". Biological Journal of the Linnean Society. 95 (4): 779–789. doi:10.1111/j.1095-8312.2008.01082.x. S2CID 32572659.
- Kümmerli, R.; Keller, L. (2007). "Contrasting population genetic structure for workers and queens in the putatively unicolonial ant Formica exsecta" (PDF). Molecular Ecology. 16 (21): 4493–4503. doi:10.1111/j.1365-294X.2007.03514.x. PMID 17868291. S2CID 2612556.
- Duffie, C. V.; Glenn, T. C.; Vargas, F. H.; Parker, P. G. (2009). "Genetic structure within and between island populations of the flightless cormorant (Phalacrocorax harrisi)". Molecular Ecology. 18 (10): 2103–2111. doi:10.1111/j.1365-294X.2009.04179.x. PMID 19635072. S2CID 13257466.
- Bollmer, J. L.; Hull, J. M.; Ernest, H. B.; Sarasola, J. H.; Parker, P. G. (2011). "Reduced MHC and neutral variation in the Galápagos hawk, an island endemic". BMC Evolutionary Biology. 11: 143. doi:10.1186/1471-2148-11-143. PMC 3118149. PMID 21612651.
- Parker, P. G.; Buckles, E. L.; Farrington, H.; Petren, K.; Whiteman, N. K.; Ricklefs, R. E.; Bollmer, J. L.; Jiménez-Uzcátegui, G. (2011). Davis, Todd (ed.). "110 Years of Avipoxvirus in the Galapagos Islands". PLOS ONE. 6 (1) e15989. Bibcode:2011PLoSO...615989P. doi:10.1371/journal.pone.0015989. PMC 3020966. PMID 21249151.
- Jones, T. C.; Parker, P. G. (2008). "First male sperm precedence in multiply-mated females of the cooperative spider Anelosimus studiosus (Araneae, Theridiidae)". Journal of Arachnology. 36 (3): 527–532. doi:10.1636/St06-63.1. S2CID 9606511.
- Parker, P. G.; Whiteman, N. K.; Miller, R. E. (2006). "Conservation Medicine on the Galápagos Islands: Partnerships Among Behavioral, Population, and Veterinary Scientists". The Auk. 123 (3): 625–638. doi:10.1642/0004-8038(2006)123[625:CMOTGI]2.0.CO;2. PMC 7109894. PMID 32287336.
- Whiteman, N. K.; Dosanjh, V. S.; Palma, R. L.; Hull, J. M.; Kimball, R. T.; Sánchez, P.; Sarasola, J. H. N.; Parker, P. G. (2009). "Molecular and Morphological Divergence in a Pair of Bird Species and Their Ectoparasites". Journal of Parasitology. 95 (6): 1372–1382. doi:10.1645/GE-2009.1. hdl:11336/81708. PMID 19655998. S2CID 8696374.
- Siers, S.; Merkel, J.; Bataille, A.; Vargas, F. H.; Parker, P. G. (2010). "Ecological Correlates of Microfilariae Prevalence in Endangered Galápagos Birds". Journal of Parasitology. 96 (2): 259–272. doi:10.1645/GE-2070.1. PMID 19954259. S2CID 1705840.
- Levin, I. I.; Valkiūnas, G.; Iezhova, T. A.; O'Brien, S. L.; Parker, P. G. (2012). "Novel Haemoproteus Species (Haemosporida: Haemoproteidae) from the Swallow-Tailed Gull (Lariidae), with Remarks on the Host Range of Hippoboscid-Transmitted Avian Hemoproteids". Journal of Parasitology. 98 (4): 847–854. doi:10.1645/GE-3007.1. PMID 22324933. S2CID 5732594.
- Levin, I. I.; Parker, P. G. (2012). "Prevalence of Hemoproteus iwa in Galapagos Great Frigatebirds (Fregata minor) and Their Obligate Fly Ectoparasite (Olfersia spinifera)". Journal of Parasitology. 98 (5): 924–929. doi:10.1645/GE-3027.1. PMID 22509857. S2CID 37699075.
- Whiteman, N. K.; Sánchez, P.; Merkel, J.; Klompen, H.; Parker, P. G. (2006). "Cryptic Host Specificity of an Avian Skin Mite (Epidermoptidae) Vectored by Louseflies (Hippoboscidae) Associated with Two Endemic Galápagos Bird Species". Journal of Parasitology. 92 (6): 1218–1228. doi:10.1645/GE-918R.1. PMID 17304798. S2CID 35011679.
- Baião, P. C.; Parker, P. G. (2009). "No Evidence of Extra-Pair Fertilization in Red-footed Boobies(Sula sula)". Waterbirds. 32: 179–182. doi:10.1675/063.032.0122. S2CID 83735321.
- Santiago-Alarcon, D.; Tanksley, S. M.; Parker, P. G. (2006). "Morphological Variation and Genetic Structure of Galapagos Dove (Zenaida Galapagoensis) Populations: Issues in Conservation for the Galapagos Bird Fauna". The Wilson Journal of Ornithology. 118 (2): 194–207. doi:10.1676/05-010.1. S2CID 35184302.
- Dematteo, K. E.; Rinas, M. A.; Sede, M. M.; Davenport, B.; Argüelles, C. F.; Lovett, K.; Parker, P. G. (2009). "Detection Dogs: An Effective Technique for Bush Dog Surveys". Journal of Wildlife Management. 73 (8): 1436–1440. doi:10.2193/2008-545. S2CID 86160659.
- Wright, J.; Parker, P. G.; Lundy, K. J. (1999). "Relatedness and chick-feeding effort in the cooperatively breeding Arabian babbler". Animal Behaviour. 58 (4): 779–785. doi:10.1006/anbe.1999.1204. PMID 10512651. S2CID 36106980.
- Worden, B. D.; Parker, P. G.; Pappas, P. W. (2000). "Parasites reduce attractiveness and reproductive success in male grain beetles". Animal Behaviour. 59 (3): 543–550. doi:10.1006/anbe.1999.1368. PMID 10715176. S2CID 1005831.
- Huyvaert, K. P.; Anderson, D. J.; Jones, T. C.; Duan, W.; Parker, P. G. (2000). "Extra-pair paternity in waved albatrosses". Molecular Ecology. 9 (9): 1415–1419. doi:10.1046/j.1365-294x.2000.00996.x. PMID 10972780. S2CID 36426746.
- Padilla, L. R.; Huyvaert, K. P.; Merkel, J.; Miller, R. E.; Parker, P. G. (2003). "Hematology, plasma chemistry, serology, and Chlamydophila status of the waved albatross (Phoebastria irrorata) on the Galapagos Islands". Journal of Zoo and Wildlife Medicine. 34 (3): 278–283. doi:10.1638/02-076. PMID 14582791. S2CID 38571222.
- Padilla, L. R.; Santiago-Alarcon, D.; Merkel, J.; Miller, R. E.; Parker, P. G. (2004). "Survey for Haemoproteus spp., Trichomonas gallinae, Chlamydophila psittaci, and Salmonella spp. in Galapagos Islands columbiformes". Journal of Zoo and Wildlife Medicine. 35 (1): 60–64. doi:10.1638/03-029. PMID 15193075. S2CID 22944852.
- Whiteman, N. K.; Parker, P. G. (2004). "Effects of Host Sociality on Ectoparasite Population Biology". Journal of Parasitology. 90 (5): 939–947. doi:10.1645/GE-310R. PMID 15562590. S2CID 9238652.
- Mohanraj, R.; Parker, P. G.; Stephen, L. J.; Brodie, M. J. (2005). "Levetiracetam in refractory epilepsy: A prospective observational study". Seizure. 14 (1): 23–27. doi:10.1016/j.seizure.2004.02.006. PMID 15642496. S2CID 15520254.
- Dematteo, K. E.; Karagiannis, K. L.; Asa, C. S.; Macek, M. S.; Snyder, T. L.; Tieber, A. M.; Parker, P. G. (2004). "Semen collection and artificial insemination in the common piping guan (Pipile cumanensis cumanensis): Potential applications for Cracidae (Aves: Galliformes)". Journal of Zoo and Wildlife Medicine. 35 (4): 447–458. doi:10.1638/03-088. PMID 15732585. S2CID 11391692.
- McGlothlin, J. W.; Parker, P. G.; Nolan Jr, V.; Ketterson, E. D. (2005). "Correlational selection leads to genetic integration of body size and an attractive plumage trait in dark-eyed juncos". Evolution; International Journal of Organic Evolution. 59 (3): 658–671. doi:10.1554/04-163. PMID 15856707. S2CID 198158841.
- Thiel, T.; Whiteman, N. K.; Tirapé, A.; Baquero, M. I.; Cedeño, V.; Walsh, T.; Uzcátegui, G. J.; Parker, P. G. (2005). "Characterization of canarypox-like viruses infecting endemic birds in the Galápagos Islands". Journal of Wildlife Diseases. 41 (2): 342–353. doi:10.7589/0090-3558-41.2.342. PMID 16107669. S2CID 8194562.
- Whiteman, N. K.; Matson, K. D.; Bollmer, J. L.; Parker, P. G. (2006). "Disease ecology in the Galapagos Hawk (Buteo galapagoensis): Host genetic diversity, parasite load and natural antibodies". Proceedings of the Royal Society B: Biological Sciences. 273 (1588): 797–804. doi:10.1098/rspb.2005.3396. PMC 1560217. PMID 16618672.
- Reed, W. L.; Clark, M. E.; Parker, P. G.; Raouf, S. A.; Arguedas, N.; Monk, D. S.; Snajdr, E.; Nolan Jr, V.; Ketterson, E. D. (2006). "Physiological Effects on Demography: A Long‐Term Experimental Study of Testosterone's Effects on Fitness". The American Naturalist. 167 (5): 667–683. doi:10.1086/503054. PMID 16671011. S2CID 18375177.
- Travis, E. K.; Vargas, F. H.; Merkel, J.; Gottdenker, N.; Miller, R. E.; Parker, P. G. (2006). "Hematology, plasma chemistry, and serology of the flightless cormorant (Phalacrocorax harrisi) in the Galapagos Islands, Ecuador". Journal of Wildlife Diseases. 42 (1): 133–141. doi:10.7589/0090-3558-42.1.133. PMID 16699155. S2CID 19053223.
- Travis, E. K.; Vargas, F. H.; Merkel, J.; Gottdenker, N.; Miller, R. E.; Parker, P. G. (2006). "Hematology, serum chemistry, and serology of Galápagos penguins (Spheniscus mendiculus) in the Galápagos Islands, Ecuador". Journal of Wildlife Diseases. 42 (3): 625–632. doi:10.7589/0090-3558-42.3.625. PMID 17092893. S2CID 21900210.
- Bollmer, J. L.; Vargas, F. H. N.; Parker, P. G. (2007). "Low MHC variation in the endangered Galápagos penguin (Spheniscus mendiculus)". Immunogenetics. 59 (7): 593–602. doi:10.1007/s00251-007-0221-y. PMID 17457582. S2CID 22783121.
- Baiao, P. C.; Schreiber, E.; Parker, P. G. (2007). "The Genetic Basis of the Plumage Polymorphism in Red-Footed Boobies (Sula sula): A Melanocortin-1 Receptor (MC1R) Analysis". Journal of Heredity. 98 (4): 287–292. doi:10.1093/jhered/esm030. PMID 17602182.
- Merkel, J.; Jones, H. I.; Whiteman, N. K.; Gottdenker, N.; Vargas, H.; Travis, E. K.; Miller, R. E.; Parker, P. G. (2007). "Microfilariae in Galápagos Penguins (Spheniscus Mendiculus) and Flightless Cormorants (Phalacrocorax Harrisi): Genetics, Morphology, and Prevalence". Journal of Parasitology. 93 (3): 495–503. doi:10.1645/GE-1009R.1. PMID 17626340. S2CID 26053615.
- Whiteman, N. K.; Kimball, R. T.; Parker, P. G. (2007). "Co-phylogeography and comparative population genetics of the threatened Galápagos hawk and three ectoparasite species: Ecology shapes population histories within parasite communities". Molecular Ecology. 16 (22): 4759–4773. doi:10.1111/j.1365-294X.2007.03512.x. PMID 18028178. S2CID 26303088.
- Ryder, T. B.; McDonald, D. B.; Blake, J. G.; Parker, P. G.; Loiselle, B. A. (2008). "Social networks in the lek-mating wire-tailed manakin (Pipra filicauda)". Proceedings of the Royal Society B: Biological Sciences. 275 (1641): 1367–1374. doi:10.1098/rspb.2008.0205. PMC 2602714. PMID 18381257.
- Santiago-Alarcon, D.; Whiteman, N. K.; Parker, P. G.; Ricklefs, R. E.; Valkiūnas, G. (2008). "Patterns of Parasite Abundance and Distribution in Island Populations of Galápagos Endemic Birds". Journal of Parasitology. 94 (3): 584–590. doi:10.1645/GE-1351.1. PMID 18605785. S2CID 2147505.
- Gottdenker, N. L.; Walsh, T.; Jiménez-Uzcátegui, G.; Betancourt, F.; Cruz, M.; Soos, C.; Miller, R. E.; Parker, P. G. (2008). "Causes of mortality of wild birds submitted to the Charles Darwin Research Station, Santa Cruz, Galapagos, Ecuador from 2002-2004". Journal of Wildlife Diseases. 44 (4): 1024–1031. doi:10.7589/0090-3558-44.4.1024. PMID 18957662.
- Ryder, T. B.; Parker, P. G.; Blake, J. G.; Loiselle, B. A. (2009). "It takes two to tango: Reproductive skew and social correlates of male mating success in a lek-breeding bird". Proceedings of the Royal Society B: Biological Sciences. 276 (1666): 2377–2384. doi:10.1098/rspb.2009.0208. PMC 2690469. PMID 19324732.
- Duraes, R.; Loiselle, B. A.; Parker, P. G.; Blake, J. G. (2009). "Female mate choice across spatial scales: Influence of lek and male attributes on mating success of blue-crowned manakins". Proceedings of the Royal Society B: Biological Sciences. 276 (1663): 1875–1881. doi:10.1098/rspb.2008.1752. PMC 2674486. PMID 19324796.
- Hoeck, P. E. A.; Bollmer, J. L.; Parker, P. G.; Keller, L. F. (2010). "Differentiation with drift: A spatio-temporal genetic analysis of Galapagos mockingbird populations (Mimus spp.)". Philosophical Transactions of the Royal Society B: Biological Sciences. 365 (1543): 1127–38. doi:10.1098/rstb.2009.0311. PMC 2830237. PMID 20194174.
- Valkiūnas, G.; Santiago-Alarcon, D.; Levin, I. I.; Iezhova, T. A.; Parker, P. G. (2010). "A New Haemoproteus Species (Haemosporida: Haemoproteidae) from the Endemic Galapagos Dove Zenaida galapagoensis, with Remarks on the Parasite Distribution, Vectors, and Molecular Diagnostics". Journal of Parasitology. 96 (4): 783–792. doi:10.1645/GE-2442.1. PMID 20486741. S2CID 2124070.
- Deem, S. L.; Merkel, J.; Ballweber, L.; Vargas, F. H.; Cruz, M. B.; Parker, P. G. (2010). "Exposure to Toxoplasma gondii in Galapagos Penguins (Spheniscus mendiculus) and flightless cormorants (Phalacrocorax harrisi) in the Galapagos Islands, Ecuador". Journal of Wildlife Diseases. 46 (3): 1005–1011. doi:10.7589/0090-3558-46.3.1005. PMID 20688714. S2CID 19708122.
- Hailer, F.; Schreiber, E. A.; Miller, J. M.; Levin, I. I.; Parker, P. G.; Chesser, R. T.; Fleischer, R. C. (2010). "Long-term isolation of a highly mobile seabird on the Galapagos". Proceedings of the Royal Society B: Biological Sciences. 278 (1707): 817–825. doi:10.1098/rspb.2010.1342. PMC 3049043. PMID 20861041.
- Deem, S. L.; Parker, P. G.; Cruz, M. B.; Merkel, J.; Hoeck, P. E. (2011). "Comparison of blood values and health status of Floreana Mockingbirds (Mimus trifasciatus) on the islands of Champion and Gardner-by-Floreana, Galápagos Islands" (PDF). Journal of Wildlife Diseases. 47 (1): 94–106. doi:10.7589/0090-3558-47.1.94. PMID 21270000. S2CID 35779717.
- Peters, M. B.; Hagen, C.; Whiteman, N. K.; Parker, P. G.; Glenn, T. C. (2009). "Characterization of 10 microsatellite loci in an avian louse, Degeeriella regalis(Phthiraptera: Ischnocera: Philopteridae)". Molecular Ecology Resources. 9 (3): 882–884. doi:10.1111/j.1755-0998.2008.02363.x. PMID 21564777. S2CID 27380888.
- Peters, M. B.; Whiteman, N. K.; Hagen, C.; Parker, P. G.; Glenn, T. C. (2009). "Eight polymorphic microsatellite markers isolated from the widespread avian louseColpocephalum turbinatum(Phthiraptera: Amblycera: Menoponidae)". Molecular Ecology Resources. 9 (3): 910–912. doi:10.1111/j.1755-0998.2008.02473.x. PMID 21564787. S2CID 21961615.
- Dematteo, K. E.; Parker, P. G.; Eggert, L. S. (2009). "Characterization of dinucleotide microsatellite loci and confirmation of sexing primers for the bush dog (Speothos venaticus)". Molecular Ecology Resources. 9 (4): 1219–1220. doi:10.1111/j.1755-0998.2009.02603.x. PMID 21564882. S2CID 7683229.
- Gerlach, N. M.; McGlothlin, J. W.; Parker, P. G.; Ketterson, E. D. (2011). "Promiscuous mating produces offspring with higher lifetime fitness". Proceedings of the Royal Society B: Biological Sciences. 279 (1730): 860–866. doi:10.1098/rspb.2011.1547. PMC 3259935. PMID 21881136.
- Chaves, J. A.; Parker, P. G.; Smith, T. B. (2012). "Origin and population history of a recent colonizer, the yellow warbler in Galápagos and Cocos Islands". Journal of Evolutionary Biology. 25 (3): 509–521. doi:10.1111/j.1420-9101.2011.02447.x. PMID 22239606. S2CID 31797643.
- Deem, S. L.; Rivera-Parra, J. L.; Parker, P. G. (2012). "Health evaluation of Galapagos Hawks (Buteo galapagoensis) on Santiago Island, Galapagos". Journal of Wildlife Diseases. 48 (1): 39–46. doi:10.7589/0090-3558-48.1.39. PMID 22247372.
- Sari, E. H. R.; Parker, P. G. (2012). "Understanding the colonization history of the Galápagos flycatcher (Myiarchus magnirostris)". Molecular Phylogenetics and Evolution. 63 (2): 244–254. doi:10.1016/j.ympev.2011.10.023. PMID 22348940.
- Baiao, P. C.; Parker, P. G. (2012). "Evolution of the Melanocortin-1 Receptor (MC1R) in Boobies and Gannets (Aves, Suliformes)". Journal of Heredity. 103 (3): 322–329. doi:10.1093/jhered/esr151. PMID 22351934.
- Levin, I. I.; Parker, P. G. (2012). "Prevalence of Hemoproteus iwa in Galapagos Great Frigatebirds (Fregata minor) and Their Obligate Fly Ectoparasite (Olfersia spinifera)". Journal of Parasitology. 98 (5): 924–929. doi:10.1645/GE-3027.1. PMID 22509857. S2CID 37699075.
- Bataille, A.; Fournié, G.; Cruz, M.; Cedeño, V.; Parker, P. G.; Cunningham, A. A.; Goodman, S. J. (2012). "Host selection and parasite infection in Aedes taeniorhynchus, endemic disease vector in the Galápagos Islands". Infection, Genetics and Evolution. 12 (8): 1831–41. doi:10.1016/j.meegid.2012.07.019. PMID 22921730.
- Parker, P. G. (1973). "Fractures of the pelvis". Proceedings of the Mine Medical Officers' Association. 52 (415): 58–60. PMID 4779990.
- Strauss, R. P.; Claris, S. M.; Lindahl, R. L.; Parker, P. G. (1980). "Patients' attitudes toward quality of assurance in dentistry". The Journal of the American College of Dentists. 47 (2): 101–109. PMID 6929314.
- Peare, T.; Parker, P. G. (1996). "Local genetic structure within two rookeries of Chelonia mydas (the green turtle)". Heredity. 77 (6): 619–628. doi:10.1038/hdy.1996.189. PMID 8972082.
