= Sandra Vehrencamp =

American ornithologist

Sandra Lee Vehrencamp
- Born: February 11, 1948 (age 78); Glendale, California, U.S.
- Education: University of California at Berkeley, Cornell University
- Spouse: Jack Bradbury
- Children: Kristin Nobel (1975), Katrina Bradbury (1979)
- Scientific career
- Fields: Behavioral ecology
- Workplaces: University of California at San Diego, Cornell University

Sandra Lee Vehrencamp (born 11 February 1948) is an American behavioral ecologist known for her research on avian social behavior and communication, particularly among bird species in Costa Rica. She served as a faculty member of Cornell University's Lab of Ornithology and Department of Neurobiology and Behavior and taught graduate students while conducting research until retiring as of October 2010. She currently resides in Ithaca, New York, with her husband, Jack Bradbury.

== Education ==
She graduated from Crescenta Valley High School in La Crescenta, California, in 1965. She went on to receive her bachelor's degree in zoology with honors from the University of California at Berkeley in 1970, and her Ph.D. in animal behavior from Cornell University in 1976.

== Personal and early life ==
Vehrencamp grew up in La Crescenta, California, and attended Crescenta Valley High School. During the time period Sandra Vehrencamp was born, women's scientific talents were substantially under-appreciated. She received her high-school diploma in 1965 and went on to pursue a higher education from there. However, before 1950, women earned less than 10% of Bachelor's in the STEM fields and less than 5% of the PhDs in these fields. She grew up with this stigma surrounding her and still managed to attend the University of California at Berkeley for her bachelors and Cornell University for her doctorate. The percentages of women receiving bachelors and PhDs were steadily rising throughout her young life, although the year she graduated from Cornell University still less than 10% of doctorates were received by women. Scientific women of the time were quite rare, and this fact highlights her dedication and passion for science, as is noted by other scientists. While in the midst of her education at Cornell University, she met her spouse-to-be, Jack Bradbury. They had their first child in 1975, just a year before Vehrencamp received her PhD and started her career. Their second child was born in 1979, when Vehrencamp was just beginning to settle into a career path. These few starting years were hectic for Vehrencamp, and it has been noted how impressive it is that she managed to keep furthering her career the way she did. Her older daughter, Kristin Nobel, is currently married and has two kids, her family living in Maine. Her younger daughter, Katrina Bradbury, studied ethnobotany but died in 2015.

== Career ==
Since 1976 she worked with University of California at San Diego and Cornell University conducting intensive research about birds and their behavior, specifically song patterns and mating habits. She taught animal communication research methods in animal behavior to graduate students during her time at Cornell University, and currently holds a professor emerita position there. Vehrencamp is said to have been an outstanding mentor, teacher, and scientist by her graduate students. Additionally, she worked with the Laboratory of Ornithology Bioacoustics Research Program and contributed to the bird call section, specifically that of Costa Rican wrens; she still holds an emerita professor appointment there as well. Throughout her career she published over 75 papers, which have been cited more than 2,400 times, and wrote 19 book chapters. She collaborated with her husband, Jack Bradbury - a behavioral ecologist as well - consistently during her time as a scientist. They co-wrote a textbook, Principles of Animal Communication, published in 1998. It is a widely used work that combines physics, chemistry, neurobiology, cognitive science, evolutionary biology, behavioral ecology, and economics to delve deeply into animals and how they signal and communicate with one another. Its importance is highlighted by the fact that it has been cited more than 1,000 times. Together with Jack W. Bradbury, Vehrencamp co-authored Principles of Animal Communication, a textbook first published in 1998 that examines animal signalling and communication from several scientific perspectives.

=== Notable research ventures ===
- Veherncamp quantified the energetic cost of display in sage grouse. This study employed doubly labeled water to measure oxygen consumption for a period of about a week while observing the lek attendance and display rate of each male. The key findings were that 1) male display activity varied enormously, from zero to daily attendance with high display rate, 2) only the most active males achieved matings, and 3) more active males traveled further away from the lek each day to forage. The paper was touted as one of the first to test honest signaling theory using energetics.
- Vehrencamp studied the communal nesting behavior of the Groove-billed Ani in Costa Rica, and the conflict that occurs among the co-breeding pairs despite their overall cooperation. The egg-tossing behavior, which leads to a general advantage for the last-laying female, was a surprising finding at the time. In another study aimed at identifying the advantage to group as opposed to solitary pair breeding, she found that groups of two pairs had the highest fitness, benefitting from higher adult survival in groups while avoiding the excessive nestling competition and losses found in groups of 3 or more pairs. Based on these studies, Vehrencamp synthesized an optimization model that defined conditions under which group-living and cooperating individuals interact in a despotic versus and egalitarian manner.
- Vehrencamp's songbird communication work focused on species with male song repertoires and investigated why such repertoires should evolve and how they are used in communication. Her research group found that in both song sparrows and the banded wren, males shared some fraction of their song types with each of their neighbors, and strategically used song-type matching and switching between song types to signal different levels of aggressive escalation. The song sparrow study was among the first to employ interactive playback techniques to test the signaling function of song type matching, overlapping, and different switching patterns, as well as the significance of trill structure.

Vehrencamp spent decades of her life studying behavioral ecology, and retired fully accomplished in 2010. Her detailed work earned several awards soon after.

== Awards ==
- In 2004 she received the Faculty Research Mentor Award from Cornell University for her outstanding performance conducting research while mentoring graduate students on bird song in Costa Rica.
- She won the William Brewster Memorial Award in 2011 for her discoveries surrounding the reproductive ecology and competition of groove-billed anis and sage-grouse. This award is presented to an author or coauthors of an exceptional body of work on the birds of the Western Hemisphere. The American Ornithologists’ Union stated that they, “honored Dr. Sandra Vehrencamp for her thorough and insightful body of work on social evolution and animal communication”. The award means significantly more when the fact that the overwhelming majority of recipients have been male is considered: out of 83 years, only 7 recipients have been female.
- Vehrencamp and her husband co-received the Exemplar Award from the Animal Behavior Society, recognizing a “major long-term contribution in animal behavior,” in 2012. This is the second most prestigious award given out by the ABS, and Vehrencamp's success is highlighted by the fact that the organization has been giving out exemplar awards since 1993 but only 4 out of 18 awards have been presented to women contributors.
- She was elected to the American Academy of Arts and Sciences as a fellow in the Biological Sciences in 2013, recognized as “a founder of the field of behavioral ecology.” It is well known in the scientific community that being appointed a fellow in this organization is considered a great honor.

== Recent publications ==
- Hall, M.L.; Rittenbach, M.R.D.; Vehrencamp, S.L. (2015). "Female song and vocal interactions with males in a neotropical wren". Frontiers in Ecology and Evolution. 17: 12.
- Vehrencamp, S.L.; Ellis, J.M.; Cropp, B.F.; Koltz, J.M. (2014). "Negotiation of territory boundaries in a songbird". Behavioral Ecology. 25 (6): 1436–1450. doi:10.1093/beheco/aru135. PMC 4235583. PMID 25419086.
- Kovach, K.A.; Hall, M.L.; Vehrencamp, S.L.; Mennill, D.J. (2014). "Timing isn't everything: Responses of tropical wrens to coordinated duets, uncoordinated duets, and alternating solos". Animal Behaviour. 95: 101–109. doi:10.1016/j.anbehav.2014.06.012. S2CID 53167221.
- Bradbury, J.W.; Vehrencamp, S.L. (2014). "Complexity and behavioral ecology". Behavioral Ecology. 25 (3): 435–442. doi:10.1093/beheco/aru014.
- Vehrencamp, S.L.; Yantachka, J.; Hall, M.L.; de Kort, S.R. (2013). "Trill performance components vary with age, season, and motivation in the banded wren". Behavioral Ecology and Sociobiology. 67 (3): 409–419. doi:10.1007/s00265-012-1461-x. PMC 3608479. PMID 23543812.
- Sakata, J.T.; Vehrencamp, S.L. (2012). "Integrating perspectives on vocal performance and consistency". Journal of Experimental Biology. 215 (2): 201–209. doi:10.1242/jeb.056911. PMC 3244338. PMID 22189763.
- Shen, S-F.; Vehrencamp, S.L.; Johnstone, R.A.; Chen, H-C.; Chan, S-F.; Liao, W-Y.; Lin, K-Y.; Yuan, H-W. (2012). "Unfavorable environment limits social conflict in Yuhina brunneiceps". Nature Communications. 3: 885. Bibcode:2012NatCo...3..885S. doi:10.1038/ncomms1894. PMID 22673912.
