= Delta Waterfowl Foundation =

North American non-profit organization

- Founded: 1911
- Type: Habitat Conservation and Hunting
- Purpose: Waterfowl habitat conservation
- Location: Bismarck, North Dakota, Winnipeg, Manitoba
- Region served: North America
- Members: 62,000
- Key people: James Ford Bell, Aldo Leopold, Hans Albert Hochbaum
- Volunteers: 670
- Website: deltawaterfowl.org

Delta Waterfowl Foundation is a non-profit organization operating in Canada and in the United States that works on waterfowl conservation, research, and hunting related programs. In 2020, Charity Navigator had ranked it among the top 10 conservation groups promoting the protection of wildlife and game lands for hunters and fishermen.

== History ==
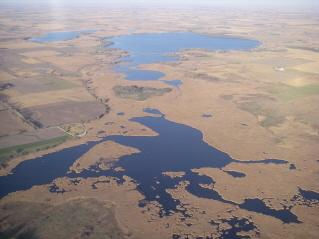
Barringer Slough in Iowa, a remnant of the extensive prairie wetlands that once covered the region

In the 1930s, James Ford Bell, founder of General Mills, purchased 5,000 acres (20 km²) of the Delta Marsh in Manitoba, Canada. For several years, Bell hunted waterfowl on the marsh in the fall and raised and released birds in the spring and summer from a privately owned hatchery.

In 1938, Bell approached Aldo Leopold, a modern Western wildlife management researcher in the United States, about establishing a research station at the Delta Marsh. Leopold brought in his graduate student, Hans Albert Hochbaum, from the University of Wisconsin–Madison. Their work included research on breeding duck ecology and habitat research.

== Activities ==
Delta Waterfowl Foundation works in four main areas: duck production, habitat conservation, research, and hunteR3 (an initiative to encourage duck hunting).

Delta Waterfowl supports graduate research on waterfowl and other programs related to waterfowl populations and waterfowl hunting in North America. It also does campus outreach to promote the roles that hunters play in environmental sciences, wildlife management, and conservation.

== See also ==
- Waterfowl hunting
- Ducks Unlimited
- Wildfowl and Wetlands Trust
