= Brewster Medal =

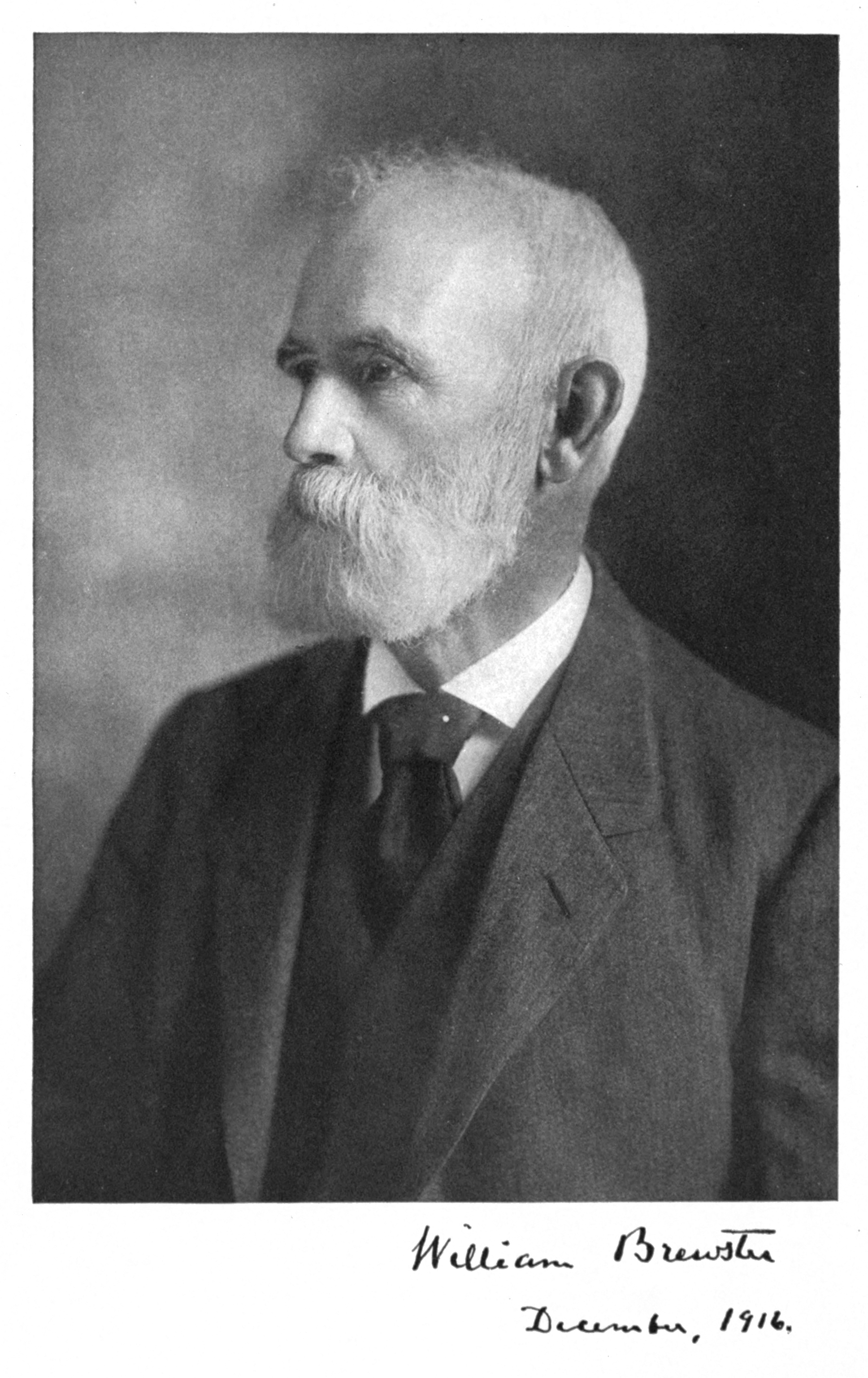
William Brewster, for whom the award is named

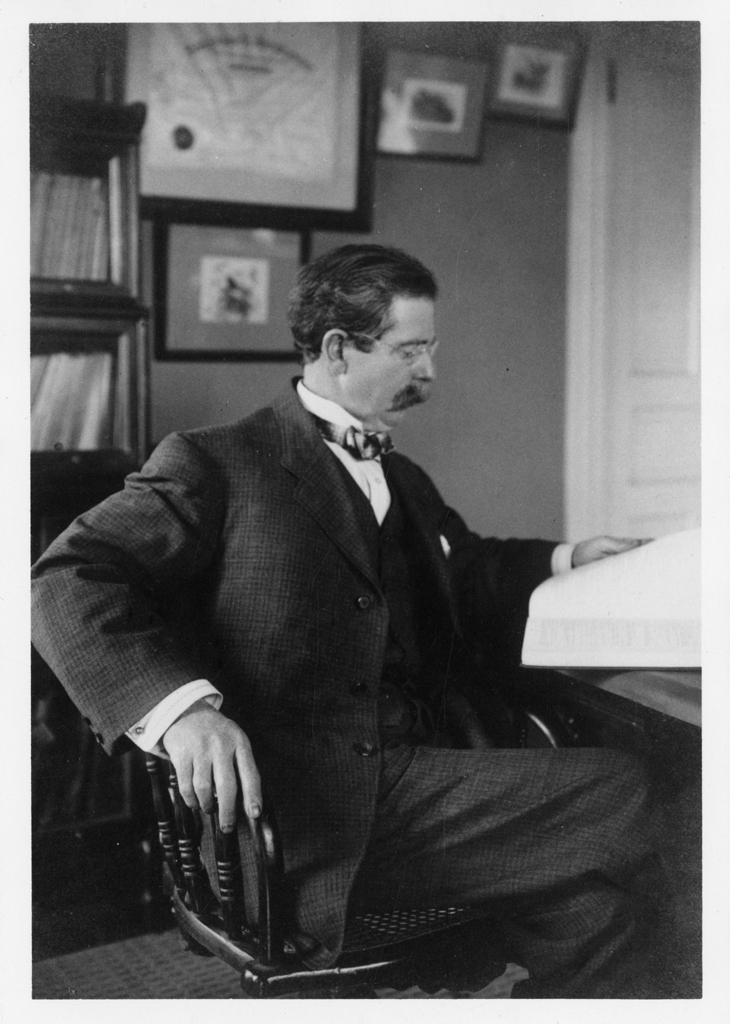
Robert Ridgway, inaugural award winner

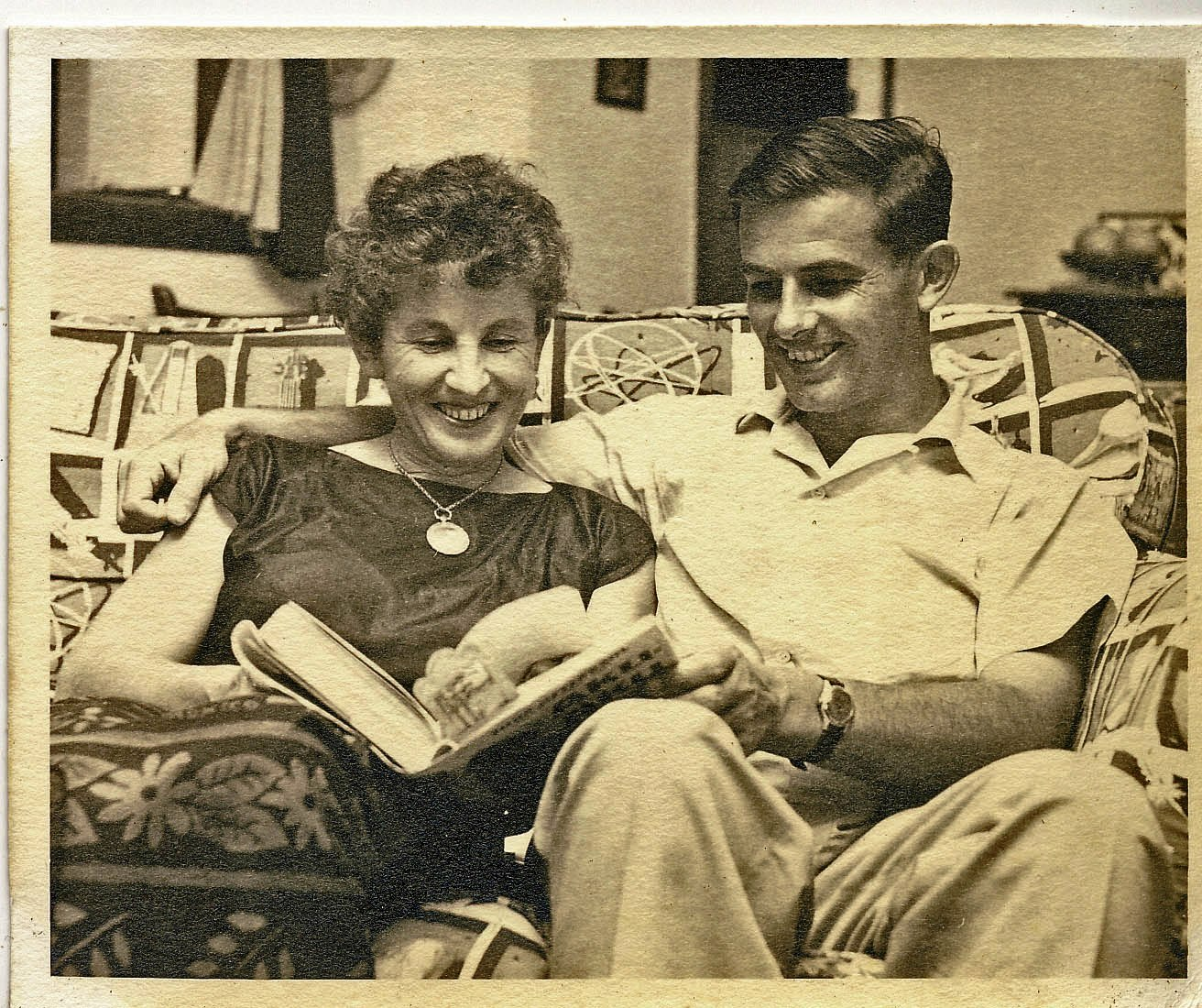
David & Barabara Snow, 1972 award winners

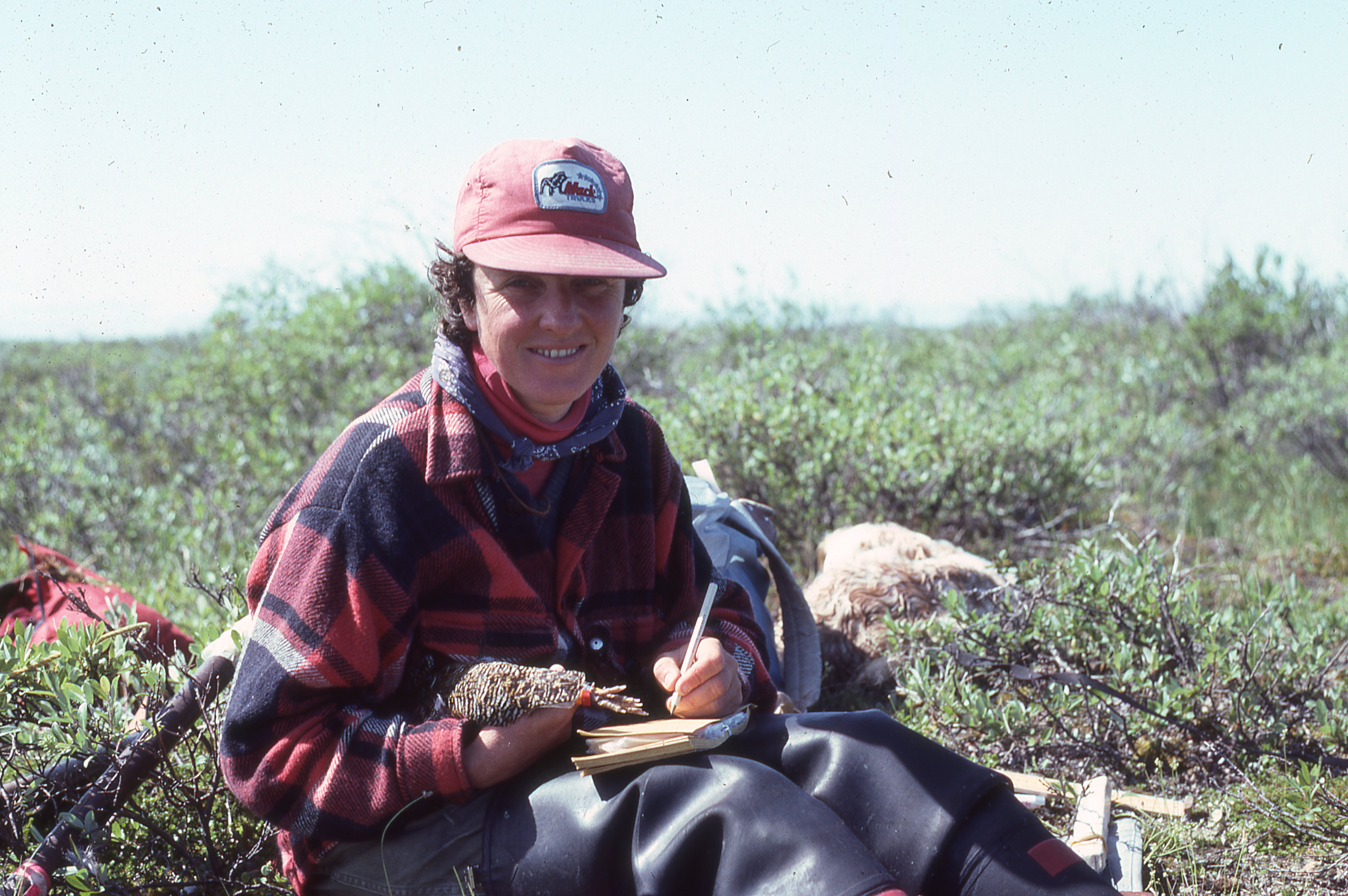
Kathy Martin, 2021 award winner

The William Brewster Memorial Award, usually referred to as the Brewster Medal, is awarded by the American Ornithologists' Union and is named for ornithologist William Brewster. It is given to an author, or coauthors who are not previous recipients, of an exceptional body of work on Western Hemisphere birds. The award comprises a medal and an honorarium provided through the William Brewster Memorial Fund. Established in 1919, the award was first given in 1921, to Robert Ridgway. From 1921 to 1937, it was given biennially; since then it has usually been made annually.

== List of winners ==
- 1921: Robert Ridgway (1850–1929)
- 1923: Arthur Cleveland Bent (1866–1954)
- 1925: W. E. Clyde Todd (1874–1969) and Melbourne Armstrong Carriker (1879–1965)
- 1927: John Charles Phillips (1876–1938)
- 1929: Carl Eduard Hellmayr (1878–1944)
- 1931: Florence Augusta Merriam Bailey (1863–1948)
- 1933: Frank Chapman (1864–1945)
- 1935: Herbert Lee Stoddard (1889–1968)
- 1937: Robert Cushman Murphy (1887–1973)
- 1938: Thomas Sadler Roberts (1858–1946)
- 1939: Witmer Stone (1866–1939) (posthumous)
- 1940: James L. Peters (1890–1952)
- 1941: Donald Ryder Dickey (1887–1932) and Adriaan Joseph van Rossem (1892–1949)
- 1942: Margaret Morse Nice (1883–1974)
- 1943: Alden Holmes Miller (1906–1965)
- 1944: Roger Tory Peterson (1908–1996)
- 1945: Hans Albert Hochbaum (1911–1988)
- 1946: No Award
- 1947: Francis H. Kortright
- 1948: David Lack (1910–1973)
- 1949: No Award
- 1950: Alexander Skutch (1904–2004)
- 1951: Samuel Charles Kendeigh (1904–1986)
- 1952: John Todd Zimmer (1889–1957)
- 1953: Hildegarde Howard (1901–1998)
- 1954: James Bond (1900–1989)
- 1955: William H. Phelps, Sr. (1875–1965)
- 1956: George H. Lowery, Jr. (1913–1978)
- 1957: Robert Porter Allen (1905–1963)
- 1958: A. William Schorger (1884–1972)
- 1959: Alexander Wetmore (1886–1978)
- 1960: Donald Sankey Farner (1915–1988)
- 1961: Harold F. Mayfield (1911–2007)
- 1962: Albert Wolfson
- 1963: Ralph S. Palmer (1914–2003)
- 1964: Herbert Friedmann (1900–1987)
- 1965: Ernst W. Mayr (1904–2005)
- 1966: George A. Bartholomew
- 1967: W. E. Clyde Todd (also awarded in 1925)
- 1968: Wesley E. Lanyon
- 1969: No Award
- 1970: No Award
- 1971: Charles Sibley (1917–1998)
- 1972: David Snow and Barbara Snow
- 1973: Rudolfo Armando Philippi Bañados and Alfred W. Johnson
- 1974: James R. King
- 1975: Jürgen Haffer
- 1976: Gordon Orians
- 1977: Rodolphe Meyer de Schauensee (1901–1984)
- 1978: Pierce Brodkorb (1908–1992)
- 1979: William R. Dawson
- 1980: Frank Pitelka
- 1981: William T. Keeton (1933–1980)
- 1982: Robert Ricklefs
- 1983: John W. Fitzpatrick and Glen E. Woolfenden
- 1983: Peter R. Grant
- 1986: Val Nolan, Jr.
- 1987: Jerram L. Brown
- 1988: Robert B. Payne
- 1989: Noel F. R. Snyder
- 1990: Fred Cooke
- 1991: Lewis W. Oring
- 1992: Ned K. Johnson
- 1993: Richard T. Holmes
- 1994: D. Frank McKinney
- 1995: Eugene S. Morton
- 1996: Kenneth P. Able
- 1997: John Avise
- 1998: Frank B. Gill
- 1999: Walter D. Koenig
- 2000: Cynthia Carey
- 2001: Stephen I. Rothstein
- 2002: James N. M. Smith
- 2003: Douglas W. Mock
- 2004: Russell Balda and Alan Kamil
- 2005: Robert M. Zink
- 2006: Sidney A. Gauthreaux
- 2007: Allan J. Baker
- 2008: Spencer Sealy
- 2009: Joanna Burger
- 2010: Steven Robert Beissinger
- 2011: Sandra L. Vehrencamp
- 2012: Robert C. Fleischer
- 2013: James Van Remsen, Jr.
- 2014: Geoffrey E. Hill
- 2015: B. Rosemary Grant
- 2016: Patricia G. Parker
- 2017: James D. Nichols
- 2018: Bette A. Loiselle
- 2019: Helen F. James & Craig Benkman
- 2020: Regina Macedo, John Rotenberry
- 2021: Marty Leonard, Kathy Martin
- 2022: Amanda Rodewald & Roxanna Torres
- 2023: Cristina Yumi Miyaki & Maren Vitousek
- 2024: Juan Carlos Reboreda & Renée Duckworth
- 2025: Kristen Ruegg & Hugh Drummond

== See also ==
- List of ornithology awards
