= Arlie W. Schorger =

Arlie William Schorger (September 6, 1884 – May 26, 1972) was a chemical researcher and businessman who also did work in ornithology. His chemistry work of note largely involved wood and waterproofing. His only chemistry book was The chemistry of cellulose and wood, but he had 34 patents.

Schorger was also active as an ornithologist. His first major work on ornithology appeared in 1929–1931. In 1951 he became a fellow of the American Ornithologists' Union, publishing The Passenger Pigeon: Its Natural History and Extinction (1955) and The Wild Turkey: Its History and Domestication (1966). He also did some work in mammalogy. In 1958 he won the Brewster Medal.

== Biography ==
Arlie William Schorger was born in Republic, Ohio, on September 6, 1884. He attended Wooster College, receiving a Bachelor of Philosophy in chemistry. He secured an assistantship at Ohio State University and later graduated there with a Master of Arts in 1908. He found a job with the Bureau of Standards in Washington, D.C., testing materials to ensure they adhered to national specifications. Schorger quickly tired of this work and took a job as an assistant chemist with the Bureau of Internal Revenue. He was transferred to the Forest Products Laboratory of the US Forest Service at Madison, Wisconsin. There, he analyzed wood samples from trees and attended graduate school at the nearby University of Wisconsin–Madison.

Schorger graduated with a Ph.D. in 1916 with a thesis on coniferous tree oils. He was hired by the C. F. Burgess Laboratories as the Director of Chemical Research. Schorger was awarded several patents for his work on mucic acid and lignin production, wood gelatin, and waterproofing. He published his only chemistry book, The Chemistry of Cellulose and Wood, in 1926. When the company spun off the Burgess Cellulose Company in 1931, Schorger was named its president, overseeing its factory in Freeport, Illinois, and its offices in Madison. He retired from chemistry in 1950 with thirty-four patents to his name.

A lifelong naturalist, Schorger decided to shift the focus of his career and pursue the wildlife management field. Schorger took field notes on birds from 1912 until 1971, making trips every Sunday. He became a member of the American Ornithologists' Union (AOU) in 1913 and published his first ornithological paper in 1931. The AOU appointed him a Fellow in 1951, and Schorger would serve on its council from 1959 to 1962. Schorger was appointed a Professor of Wildlife Management at Wisconsin–Madison on November 10, 1951. He taught for four years until his retirement in 1955, upon which he was conferred the rank of professor emeritus.

His collection of over 700 bird and animal skins, mostly from Dane County, were donated to Wisconsin–Madison shortly before his death. He was the first to preserve the skin of a cougar found in Wisconsin and presented it to Lawrence College. Schorger also collected books on ornithology and mammalogy, eventually amassing 600 volumes. This collection was also donated to Wisconsin–Madison. Schorger published The Passenger Pigeon: Its Natural History and Extinction in 1955 and The Wild Turkey: Its History and Domestication in 1966. The prior was the first book to be published on the species' history and extinction. From 1956 to 1959, Schorger served on the board of directors of the National Audubon Society.

Schorger married Margaret F. Davison in 1912. They had two sons: William Davison, a professor at the University of Michigan, and John Roger, a professor at Metropolitan State University. After her death in 1962, Schorger changed his will to provide a bequest for a Margaret Davison Schorger Scholarship in Italian art. He went 90% blind after a retinal hemorrhage in 1971. Shortly thereafter, he was found to have inoperable bladder cancer, then broke his arm in January 1972. Schorger died on May 26, 1972.
