= Donald Ryder Dickey =

American ornithologist, mammalogist and nature photographer (1887–1932)

- Donald Ryder Dickey, holding a bat
- Born: March 31, 1887; Dubuque, Iowa, United States
- Died: April 15, 1932 (aged 45); Pasadena, California, United States
- Education: Yale University
- Awards: Brewster Medal
- Scientific career
- Fields: Ornithology, Mammalogy

Donald Ryder Dickey (1887–1932) was an American ornithologist, mammalogist, and nature photographer. He collected 50,000 specimens and produced 7,500 photographs and moving images of nature subjects. At his death, his collection of bird and mammal specimens was the largest private collection in the United States.

== Biography ==
Donald Ryder Dickey was born on March 31, 1887, in Dubuque, Iowa, the son of Anna Roberts Ryder and Ernest May Dickey (superintendent of the Diamond Joe Steamship Line). In 1902, Dickey and his mother, also an avid naturalist, joined a Sierra Club group hiking King's River Cañon and climbing Mount Whitney. Others on this trip included John Muir, C. Hart Merriam, Dr. Henry Gannett, historian Theodore Hittell and landscape artist William Keith.

Dickey entered the University of California in 1906, but received his B.A. degree (with honors) from Yale University in 1910. His collegiate society memberships included Psi Upsilon, Elihu, and Phi Beta Kappa. He was active in music societies (the University and Apollo Glee Clubs and the College Choir) and was captain of the University Gun Team. During his senior year at Yale, Dickey suffered severe heart failure; he slowly recovered his health during a three-year convalescence, living for a time first in Ojai and later at his parents' home in Pasadena.

Dickey married Florence Van Vechten on June 15, 1921, and became active in community and business affairs, serving as a trustee of the Southwest Museum, Los Angeles (1920–1928), and President of the Board of Pasadena Hospital (1924–1925), and as a director of the Pasadena branch of the Pacific Southwest Trust & Savings Bank (1924–29).

== Field research ==
Upon recovering his health, Dickey began to pursue his interests in natural history by photographing and collecting birds and small mammals. He ultimately determined upon a goal of establishing a major research collection on Southern California fauna.

Dickey's field investigations included a 1915 expedition to San Clemente Island, seven summers in Canada, the 1923 Smithsonian-sponsored Tanager Expedition to Laysan Island in Hawaii to study the seabird rookeries there, and trips to Baja California, northern Michigan, New Brunswick and Newfoundland and El Salvador. Among his field assistants and collaborators were Adriaan Joseph van Rossem, Laurence M. Huey, Ruben Arthur Stirton and George A. Stirton, William Henry Burt, Henry Hargrave Sheldon, and John Zoeger. In 1925, he was awarded an honorary M.A. from Occidental College, and from 1926, he was Research Associate in Vertebrate Zoology at the California Institute of Technology. His professional memberships included the American Ornithologists' Union, the Cooper Ornithological Society (of which he was a governor from 1926 until his death) and the American Association for the Advancement of Science. Dickey was posthumously awarded the 1941 William Brewster Memorial Award by the American Ornithologists' Union, sharing the honor with A.J. van Rossem in recognition of their 1938 monograph "Birds of El Salvador."

Dickey's research collection of bird and mammal specimens and still photographs and moving images ultimately comprised 50,0000 specimens, 10,000 natural history books and papers, and 7,500 photographs. In 1926, Caltech provided Throop Hall to house the growing collection. In 1940, Dickey's widow donated the collection to the University of California, Los Angeles.

Dickey died on April 15, 1932, in Pasadena, California.

== Photography ==
Dickey's nature photography, in both still and motion picture work, was extensive and widely admired. His photographs are reprinted in The Birds of California by William Leon Dawson (1873–1928) and Life Histories of North American Birds by Arthur Cleveland Bent (1866–1954).

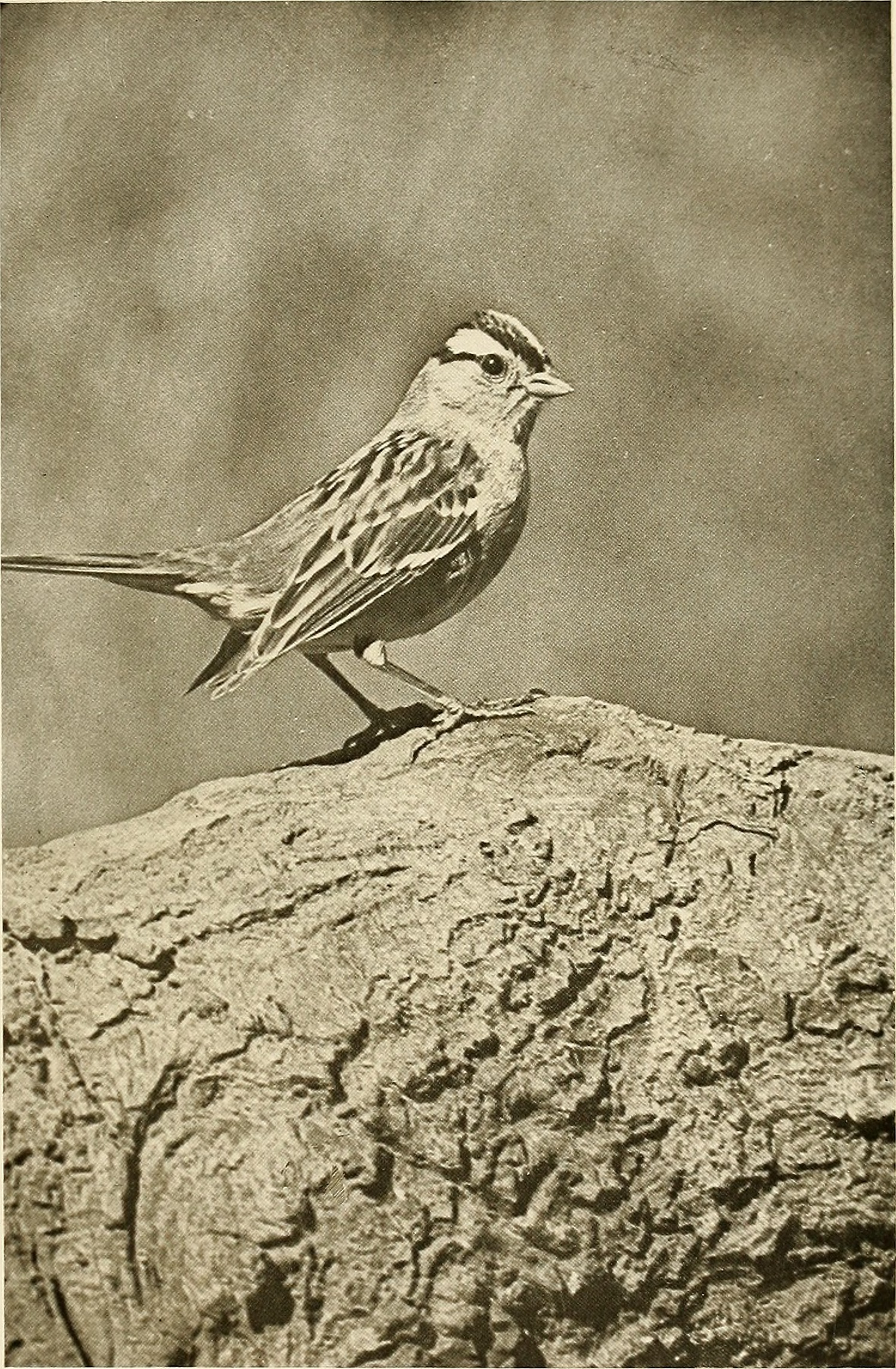
Gambel Sparrow on Log From a photograph, Copyright 1914, by D. R. Dickey Taken in Pasadena. From The Birds of California (1923).

== Patronyms ==
- Branta dickeyi Loye H. Miller, Condor, xxvi, September 15, 1924, p. 179.
- Dichromanassa rufescens dickeyi van Rossem, Condor, XXVIII, September 21, 1926, p. 246.
- Phalaenoptilus nuttallii dickeyi Grinnell, Condor, XXX, March 15, 1928, p. 153.
- Eumomota superciliosa dickeyi Griscom, Proc. New England Zool. Club, XI, October 31, 1929, p. 55.
- Colinus leucopogon dickeyi Conover, Condor, XXXIV, July 15, 1932, p. 174.
- Microdipodops megacephalus dickeyi Goldman, Proc. Biol. Soc. Wash., 40, September 26, 1927, p. 115.
- Urocyon littoralis dickeyi Grinnell and Linsdale, Proc. Biol. Sot. Wash., 43, September 26, 1930, p. 154.
- Procyon lotor dickeyi Goldman, Proc. Biol. Soc. Wash., 44, February 21, 1931, p. 18.
- Peromyscus dickeyi Burt, Trans. San Diego Soc. Nat. Hist., 7, October 31, 1932, p. 176.
- Canis latrans dickeyi Nelson, Proc. Biol. Soc. Wash., 45, November 26, 1932, pp. 223–226.
