= Donald S. Farner =

American ornithologist (1915–1988)

Donald Sankey Farner (May 2, 1915 Waumandee, Wisconsin – May 18, 1988) was an American ornithologist. He received his BS from Hamline University, and his MA and PhD from the University of Wisconsin–Madison. He served in the Navy's Medical Service Corps in World War II and later retired with the rank of captain. He was president of the American Ornithologists' Union from 1973 to 1975. He was also President of the 17th International Ornithological Congress and prepared its statutes and by-laws. He served as dean of the graduate school at Washington State University.

Among other things, he wrote several volumes on avian biology and works on the fauna of Crater Lake. His honors included a Guggenheim Fellowship in 1957 and the Brewster Medal in 1960.

His doctoral students include James R. King. Brian Follett was a postdoc in Farner's laboratory investigating photoperiodism.
