= Dorit S. Hochbaum =

American mathematician

- Other name: Dorit Simona Rotner Hochbaum
- Education: University of Pennsylvania
- Occupation: Mathematician

Dorit S. Hochbaum is a professor of industrial engineering and operations research at the University of California, Berkeley. She is known for her work on approximation algorithms, particularly for facility location, covering and packing problems, and scheduling, and on flow and cut algorithms, Markov random fields, image segmentation and clustering.

== Education and career ==
Hochbaum earned her doctorate in 1979 from the Wharton School of the University of Pennsylvania, under the supervision of Marshall Lee Fisher. She was on the faculty of Carnegie Mellon University before moving to Berkeley in 1981. In 2011 she became the Epstein Family Professor of Industrial and Systems Engineering at the University of Southern California, but has since returned to Berkeley.

== Recognition ==
In 2004, Hochbaum was awarded an honorary doctorate of sciences by the University of Copenhagen, recognizing her pioneering and inspiring contributions to mathematical optimization. Hochbaum was awarded the title of INFORMS fellow in fall 2005 for the extent of her contributions to operations research, management science and algorithm design. She is the winner of the 2011 INFORMS Computing Society prize for best paper dealing with the Operations Research/Computer Science interface. In 2014, she was selected as a fellow of the Society for Industrial and Applied Mathematics "for contributions to the design and analysis of approximation algorithms, flow problems, and their innovative use in applications, and in solving NP-hard problems."
