= Allan J. Baker =

Canadian ornithologist

Allan John Baker (9 July 1943 – 20 November 2014) was a Canadian ornithologist of New Zealand descent. He was an authority on wading birds; red knots in particular were one of his main research fields.

== Career ==
Baker grew up on a farm near Collingwood, Golden Bay, New Zealand. In 1972, he graduated with a Ph.D. from the University of Canterbury in Christchurch with a thesis on the ecology and evolution of oystercatchers titled 'Systematics and affinities of New Zealand oystercatchers.' In the same year he moved to Canada where he started as assistant curator of the ornithology department at the Royal Ontario Museum in Toronto. In 1976, he became associate curator and head of the Ornithology Department. In 1995, he became director of the Centre for Biodiversity and Conservation Biology and in 2004 head of the Department of Biology at the Royal Ontario Museum. In 1981, he was promoted to senior curator.

== Accolades ==
In 2006, he received the Speirs Award by the Society of Canadian Ornithologists. In 2007, he was awarded with the Brewster Medal of the American Ornithologists' Union.

== Works ==
- Baker, Allan J., Patricia M. Gonzalez, Theunis Piersma, Lawrence J. Niles, Ines de Lima Serrano do Nascimento, Philip W. Atkinson, Nigel A. Clark, Clive DT Minton, Mark K. Peck, and Geert Aarts. "Rapid population decline in red knots: fitness consequences of decreased refuelling rates and late arrival in Delaware Bay." Proceedings of the Royal Society of London. Series B: Biological Sciences 271, no. 1541 (2004): 875–882.
- BAKER, ALLAN J. "Mitochondrial control region sequences as tools for understanding evolution." Avian molecular evolution and systematics (1997): 51–82.
- Haddrath, Oliver, and Allan J. Baker. "Complete mitochondrial DNA geonome sequences of extinct birds: ratite phylogenetics and the vicariance biogeography hypothesis." Proceedings of the Royal Society of London. Series B: Biological Sciences 268, no. 1470 (2001): 939–945.
