= Hans Albert Hochbaum =

American artist, writer and scientist

- Born: February 9, 1911; Greeley, Colorado
- Died: March 2, 1988 (aged 77); Portage la Prairie, Manitoba
- Occupation: Artist & writer
- Spouse: Eleanor Joan

Hans Albert Hochbaum (February 9, 1911, Greeley – March 2, 1988, Portage la Prairie) was an American bird artist, writer, ornithologist and conservationist known for his work on wetland birds and the wildlife of the Canadian Arctic. He wrote several popular books on wetlands and wildfowl and was renowned for his artistry both in scratchboard illustrations and paintings.

Hochbaum was born in Greeley, Colorado, to Hans Weller and Martha Schenck. His father was famous for the idea of victory gardens which helped meet food needs during World War II. and went to school at Boise, Idaho, and Washington DC before studying art at Cornell University while also obtaining a BS in zoology studying under Arthur A. Allen. He worked at the US National Park Service and moved to the Delta Waterfowl Research Station in Manitoba in 1938 as science director. The station had been established in 1931 and his research there led to an MS degree in wildlife management in 1941 under Aldo Leopold. He also illustrated and wrote The Canvasback on a Prairie Marsh (1944) which won him the Literary Award of the Wildlife Society for that year. The American Ornithological Society honored him with a Brewster Medal in 1945. At Delta, he directed research by students from numerous universities and became an honorary professor at the University of Manitoba in 1958. Hochbaum received a Guggenheim Fellowship in 1961 and an honorary LLD in 1962. In 1962 he was awarded the Manitoba Golden Boy Award. He retired in 1970 and began to concentrate on art and writing and his third book To Ride the Wind (1973) came long after his second book Travels and Traditions of Waterfowl (1956). Hochbaum studied wildfowl behavior and researched conservation measures.

Hochbaum illustrated his books on his own and was also a skilled painter. He had several exhibitions of his paintings and some can be found in the Smithsonian in Washington and the National Museum in Ottawa When Queen Elizabeth II visited Manitoba in 1970, one of his paintings was gifted to her. He was invested Member of the Order of Canada in 1979.

He married Eleanor Joan, daughter of game warden Edward Ward, in 1939 and they had three sons and a daughter. He died from a heart attack at Portage la Prairie and was buried in Prospect Cemetery. A collection of his essays was posthumously published as Wings Over The Prairie (1994) and edited by his son George.
