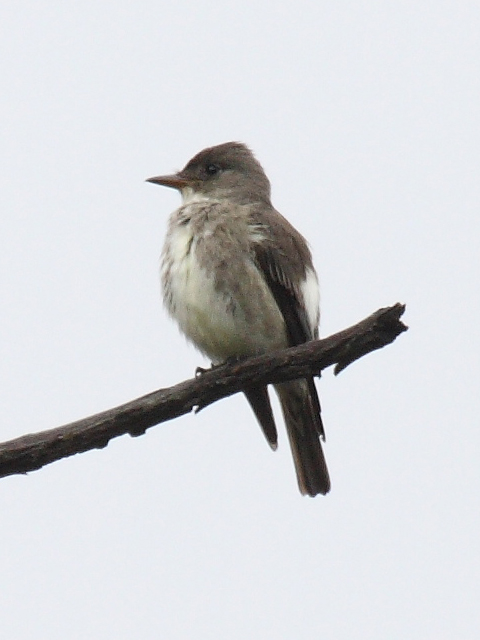

Conservation status
- Least Concern (IUCN 3.1)

Scientific classification
- Kingdom: Animalia
- Phylum: Chordata
- Class: Aves
- Order: Passeriformes
- Family: Tyrannidae
- Genus: Contopus
- Species: C. cooperi

Binomial name
- Contopus cooperi (Nuttall, 1831)
- Approximate distribution map Breeding Migration Non-breeding

= Olive-sided flycatcher =

Species of bird

The olive-sided flycatcher (Contopus cooperi) is a small to medium sized passerine bird in the family Tyrannidae, the tyrant flycatcher family. It is a migratory species that travels from South America to North America to breed during the summer. It is an agile flyer and mainly consumes flying insects caught in flight. Since 2016, this species has been assessed as being near-threatened globally (IUCN) and threatened in Canada (SRA) due to its declining populations.

== Description ==
=== Identification ===
The olive-sided flycatcher is a small to medium-sized passerine, smaller than an American robin, but bigger than sparrows. It can be identified by its olive-grey or grey-brownish plumage above with a white mid-breast section and throat. The olive tones on its back and wings are seen mainly in optimal light and when the feathers are freshly moulted. The sides of the breast area are grey and make the bird look like it is wearing a vest. It has a relatively long bill and long wings for its size. Sometimes, some of its head feathers can be raised, which make it look like it has a small crest. Male and female look similar. Olive-sided flycatchers perch in upright positions on top of dead branches or trees.

Measurements
Length	7.1–7.9 in (18–20 cm)
Weight	1.0–1.4 oz (28–40.4 g)
Wingspan	12.4–13.6 in (31.5–34.5 cm)

=== Similar species ===
Olive-sided flycatchers can be confused with other birds in the genus Contopus like the greater pewee, western wood-pewee, eastern wood-pewee, and with the eastern phoebe. They can be distinguished these species by observing the following differences: the plain grey breast of the greater pewee (as opposed to the vest-like chest of the olive-sided flycatcher); size, the olive-sided flycatcher being twice the weight of the western and eastern wood pewees; and the whiter underparts of the eastern phoebe.

== Taxonomy ==
Olive-sided flycatchers (Contopus cooperi) are in the order Passeriformes (perching birds). They are part of the family Tyrannidae, the New World or tyrant flycatchers, and the genus Contopus, the pewees. Pewees are insect eaters that generally catch their prey in flight.

The species has often been considered to be monotypic; the Clements Checklist and AOS Checklist of North American Birds currently do not recognize any subspecies. However, the disjunct populations that breeds in southern California and Baja California is sometimes recognized as a distinct subspecies, C. cooperi majorinus. This subspecies is a short-distance migrant and has longer wings and tail feathers than birds from elsewhere.

== Distribution and habitat ==
The olive-sided flycatcher is distributed throughout North and South America. Its breeding habitat ranges from California and New Mexico all the way up to central Alaska, then across Canada (except for most of the Northwest Territories and Nunavut) and through a portion of northeastern US. Its non-breeding habitat is mainly in the northern part of South America and a small area in Central America.

Their breeding habitat is mainly in open areas or edges of boreal, coniferous forests or temperate western forests, in areas up to 10,000 feet in elevation (e.g., in the Rockies), and always near water. They can also nest in cities or on farms. In their non-breeding habitat, olive-sided flycatchers use similar habitats as their breeding habitats, such as open areas and forest edges, but do not need water proximity as much as in their breeding habitat. They are also associated with habitats with very tall trees. Two forest habitats used by olive-sided flycatchers in the winter are tropical montane and tropical lowland evergreen forests.

== Behaviour ==
=== Vocalizations ===
During the breeding, olive-sided flycatcher males sing a song to attract a mate. The mnemonic for its song is "Quick, three beers!" with three successive higher-pitched sounds. The first sound is shorter and not as high-pitched and loud as the two others. Sometimes, during mating season, males can produce growling sounds or squeaks when in conflict with other males. This species' most frequent call is three quick successive pip sounds.

The rate at which males sing varies throughout the breeding season. This variation appears to be correlated indirectly with the breeding status (single, paired, or feeding young) of the individuals.

=== Reproduction ===
Olive-sided flycatchers breed once per year and usually lay clutches of 3 to 4 eggs. The incubation period lasts for 15 to 19 days and so does the nestling stage. The egg is approximately 0.8–0.9 inches long by 0.6–0.7 inches wide and is a creamy white colour with brownish spots that form a ring on the larger end of the egg. The nest location is chosen by the female and is usually on a horizontal branch of coniferous trees, but they have also been seen on other types of trees. The lowest nest was 5 feet high and the highest was 197 feet. In Western regions, olive-sided flycatchers tend to have higher nests than in their Eastern distributions. The nest is about 4.6 inches wide on the outside and 2.8 inches wide on the inside and is cup-shaped. The outer part is made with twigs and small branches, while the inside is usually lined with finer material such as grass, lichen, and needles. The hatching are born naked and helpless. The male defends a large area around the nesting territory. Both parents feed the young birds.

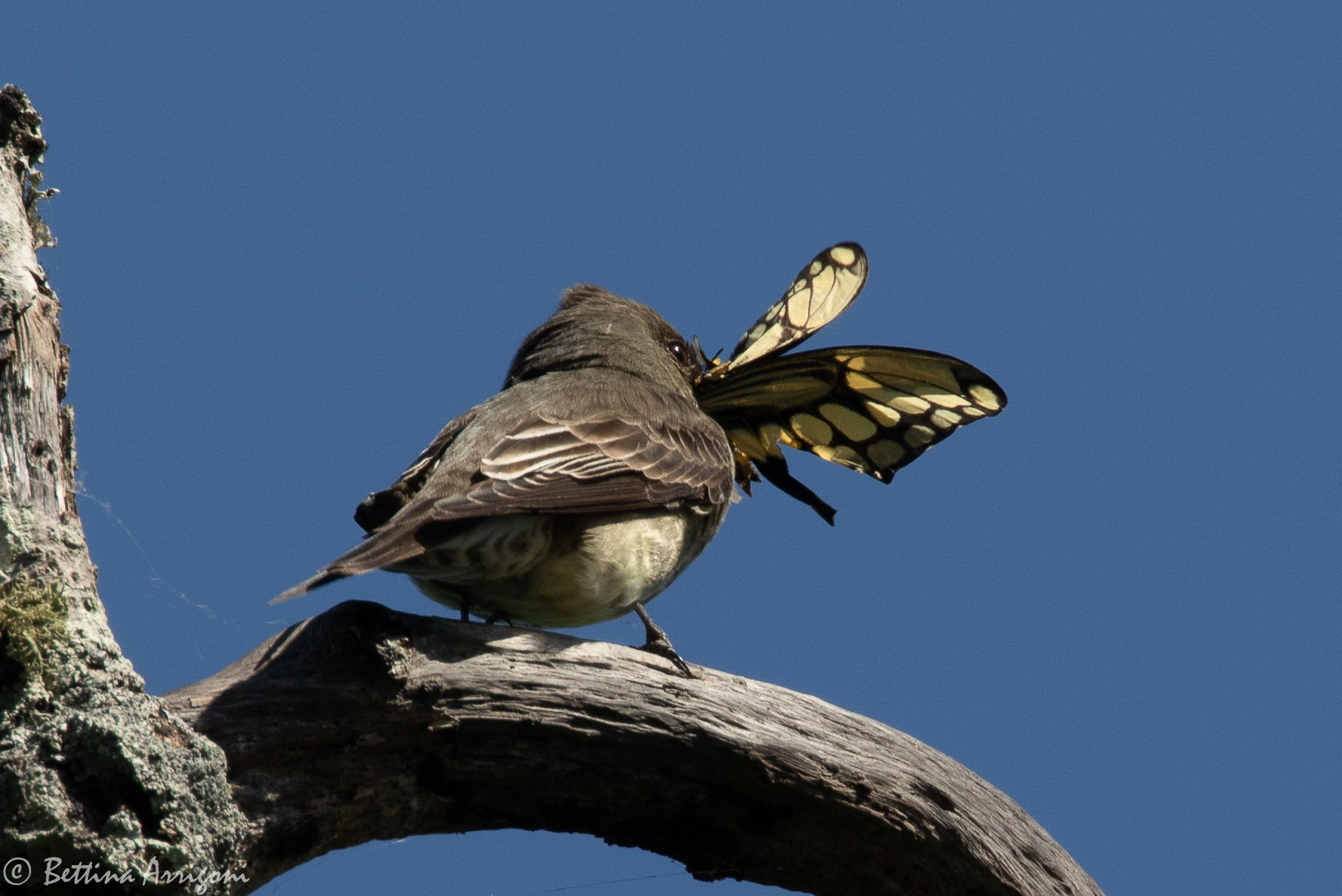
Olive-sided flycatcher consuming a butterfly.

=== Diet ===
Hawking is the main feeding method used by olive-sided flycatchers. They feed on flying insects (e.g., bees, wasps, moths, beetles, grasshoppers, etc.) and capture them in the air. They will sometimes feed on fruit during migration and non-breeding season.

During parental care, olive-sided flycatchers consume its chicks' fecal sacs. Both sexes do so within the first week of hatchings' lives, then start to remove them from the nest. This behaviour is thought to supplement the parental nutrition.

=== Migration ===
Of all the flycatcher species that breed in the United States, the olive-sided flycatcher has the longest migration. Some olive-sided flycatchers migrate up to 7,000 miles traveling between central Alaska and Bolivia.

== Status and conservation ==
According to the IUCN Red List in 2016, the olive-sided flycatcher is classified as a Near Threatened species. This conservation status is assigned when the taxon does not fit within the Critically Endangered, Endangered or Vulnerable categories, but is likely to fit within one of them in the near future. The Canadian Species at Risk Act lists the olive-sided flycatcher as threatened due to its declining population.

The olive-sided flycatcher's global population is estimated at 1.9 million individuals but appears to be declining at a rate of 3% of the population per year and has declined by 79% in the past 50 years.

=== Climate change ===
With climate change becoming increasingly important and causing important changes in the ecosystems, a study in Nova Scotia predicted climate-resilient habitats that would be suitable for olive-sided flycatchers. The authors built a model that considered mean canopy height as the most important factor for this species because it needs a habitat with tall trees. The results suggest that the relative habitat suitability for olive-sided flycatchers in the area of the study will increase with canopy height and decrease as the habitat moves further away from conifer-dominated forests and areas with dead material, which is known to be crucial for their feeding habits. This species is also expected to prefer valleys, lowlands and flatter areas, which have the potential to form wetlands or streams. The results from this study determined that the forests used in Nova Scotia have a high potential for olive-sided flycatcher populations to be resilient to climate change.

=== Threats ===
Research in Eastern Canada showed that disturbances caused by human activities and road proximity have a negative impact on olive-sided flycatcher populations in Canadian national parks. This study helped quantify the importance of protected areas for the species.

The loss of wintering habitat might be one of the main causes for its population decline. However, they do not seem to be directly impacted by forest loss, although they might be sensitive to it. Declines in flying insect populations due to insecticide use is thought to impact most directly the species. In their non-breeding habitat, on the east slope of Andes, winter populations are highly threatened, but the exact threats have not yet been identified. Burned or freshly logged forests are suitable foraging habitats for olive-sided flycatchers due to the increased presence of flying insects, but they could be negatively affected in these environments by wildfire suppression techniques or salvage logging. Collisions with communication towers seem to be another cause of mortality threatening olive-sided flycatchers.
