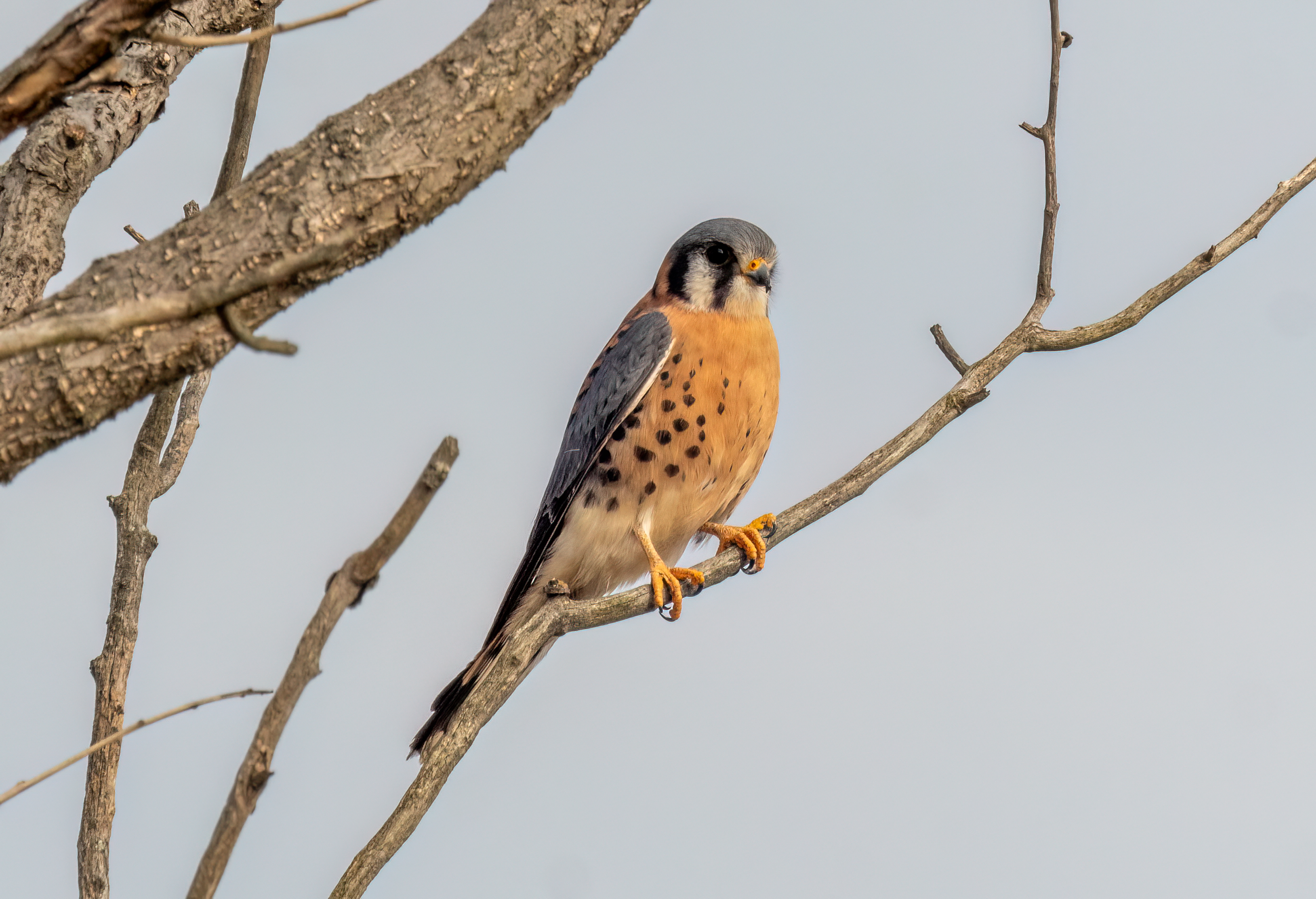
- Male F. s. sparverius, in New York, USA
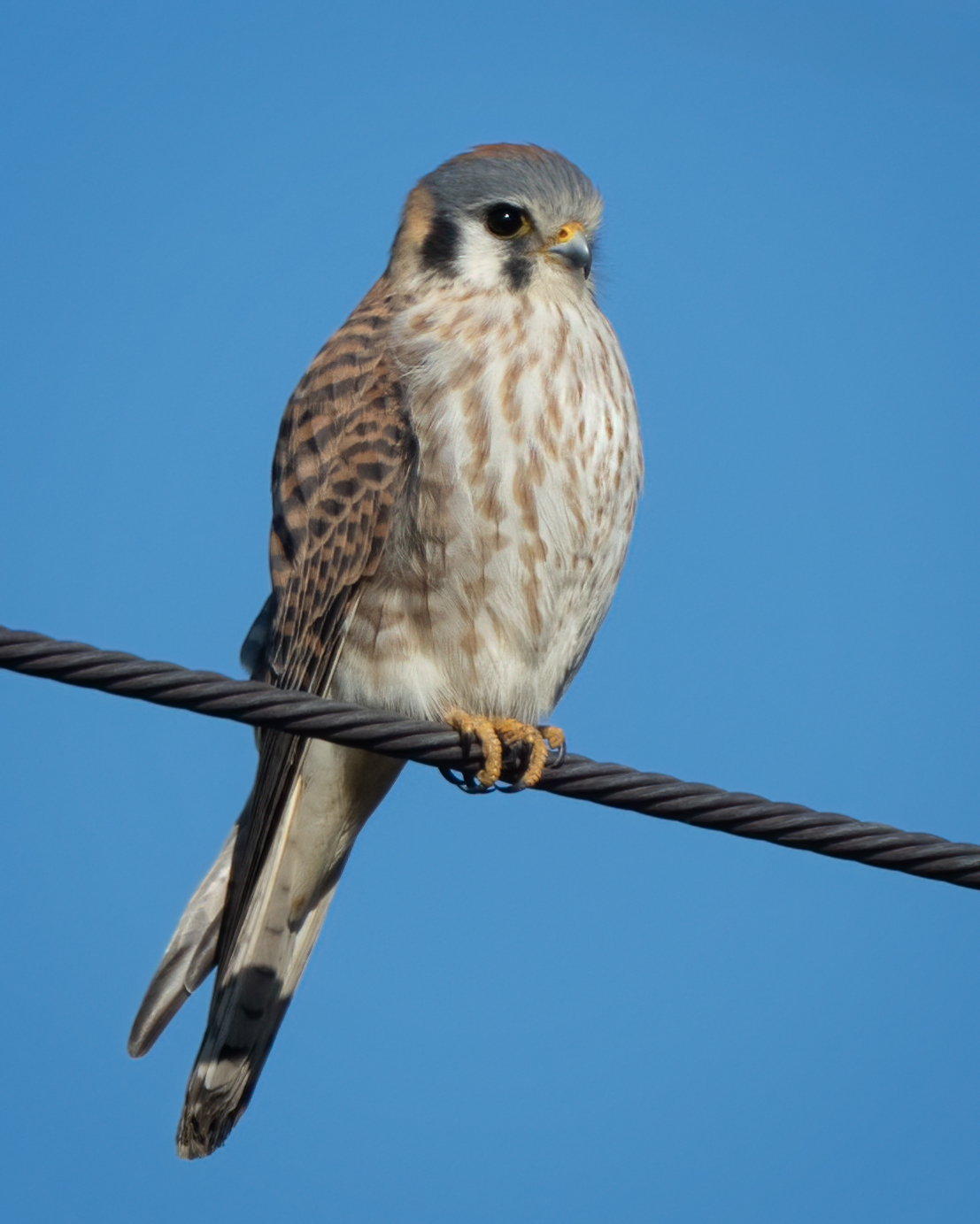
- Female F. s. sparverius, in Santa Barbara County, California, USA

Conservation status
- Least Concern (IUCN 3.1)

Scientific classification
- Kingdom: Animalia
- Phylum: Chordata
- Class: Aves
- Order: Falconiformes
- Family: Falconidae
- Genus: Falco
- Species: F. sparverius

Binomial name
- Falco sparverius Linnaeus, 1758
- American kestrel range Year round Summer (breeding) Winter (non-breeding)

= American kestrel =

Species of falcon

The American kestrel (Falco sparverius) is the smallest and most common falcon in the Americas. Though it has been called the American "sparrow hawk", this now obsolete vernacular name is a misnomer; the American kestrel is a true falcon, while neither the Eurasian sparrowhawk nor the other species called sparrowhawks are in the family Falconidae, hence only very distantly related to the American kestrel. It has a roughly two-to-one range in size over subspecies and sex, varying in size from about the weight of a blue jay to a mourning dove. It is a very successful species, occurring almost throughout North and South America except for the Arctic fringes of North America, and the densest tropical Amazon rainforest areas; it has evolved into 17 subspecies adapted to different environments and habitats throughout the region. It exhibits sexual dimorphism in size (females being moderately larger) and plumage, although both sexes have a rufous back with noticeable barring. Its plumage is colorful, and juveniles are similar in plumage to adults.

The American kestrel usually hunts in an energy-conserving fashion by perching and scanning the ground for prey to ambush, though it also hunts from the air. It sometimes hovers in the air with rapid wing beats while homing in on prey. Its diet typically consists of grasshoppers and other insects, lizards, mice, and small birds (e.g. sparrows). This broad diet has contributed to its wide success as a species. It nests in cavities in trees, cliffs, buildings, and other structures. The female lays three to seven eggs, which both sexes help to incubate.

Its breeding range extends from central and western Alaska across northern Canada to Nova Scotia, and south throughout North America, into central Mexico and the Caribbean. It is a local breeder in Central America and is widely distributed throughout South America. Most birds breeding in Canada and the northern United States migrate south in the winter. It is an occasional vagrant to Western Europe.

The American kestrel is often used in falconry, especially by beginners. Though not as strong a flyer as many other, larger falcons, proper training and weight control by the falconer can allow captive American kestrels to become effective hunters of birds in the size range of sparrows and starlings, with occasional success against birds up to approximately twice their own weight.

== Etymology ==
The genus name is from Late Latin falco meaning "falcon". The specific epithet sparverius is Medieval Latin for a "sparrowhawk".

Until the sixth edition of the AOU Checklist of North American Birds was published by the American Ornithologists' Union in 1983, the most commonly used name for the American kestrel was the sparrow hawk. This was due to a mistaken connection with the Eurasian sparrowhawk in the genus Accipiter. The sixth edition of the AOU Checklist corrected this, officially renaming the bird American kestrel. Several other colloquial names for the kestrel are also in use, including grasshopper hawk, due to its diet, and killy hawk, due to its distinct call.

== Taxonomy ==
The American kestrel was formally described in 1758 by the Swedish naturalist Carl Linnaeus in the tenth edition of his Systema Naturae under the current binomial name Falco sparverius. Linnaeus based his account on the "little hawk" that had been described and illustrated by the English naturalist Mark Catesby in his book The Natural History of Carolina, Florida and the Bahama Islands that was published between 1729 and 1732. Linnaeus specified the type locality as America but this was restricted to South Carolina based on Catesby.

Based on appearance and behavior it was for many years considered a member of the primarily European and African kestrel clade within the genus Falco, but DNA analysis shows the American kestrel is instead genetically more closely related to all other falcons, placed basal to all of the "non-kestrel" falcons. Though the species is thus not actually a kestrel in the phylogenetic sense, it has not been renamed as a result of these genetic analyses. A process of convergent evolution to fit a similar ecosystem niche, hunting small, largely ground-dwelling, prey in the same manner as the true kestrels, have left it with similar physical characteristics and hunting methods. The entire genus are all so closely related that most or all can be hybridized by artificial insemination.

=== Subspecies ===
Seventeen subspecies of the American kestrel are recognized, generally based upon plumage, size, and vocalizations:

Image	Subspecies	Notes
	F. s. sparverius	described by Carl Linnaeus in 1758, is the nominate subspecies. It is found in most of the United States, Canada and Mexico.
	F. s. paulus	described by Howe and King in 1902, is found in the southeastern United States from Louisiana to Florida.
	F. s. peninsularis	described by Edgar Alexander Mearns in 1892, is found in southern Baja California
	F. s. tropicalis	described by Ludlow Griscom in 1930, is found from southern Mexico to northern Honduras
	F. s. nicaraguensis	described by Howell in 1965, is found in Honduras and Nicaragua
	F. s. sparverioides	described by Nicholas Aylward Vigors in 1827, is found on Cuba, Isla de Juventud and the central and southern Bahamas
	F. s. dominicensis	described by Johann Friedrich Gmelin in 1788, is found on Hispaniola (both the Dominican Republic and Haiti) and Jamaica
	F. s. caribaearum	described by Gmelin in 1788, is found on Puerto Rico and throughout the Lesser Antilles to Grenada
	F. s. brevipennis	described by Hans von Berlepsch in 1892, is found in the Netherlands Antilles
	F. s. isabellinus	described by William Swainson in 1837, is found from Venezuela to northern Brazil
	F. s. ochraceus	described by Charles B. Cory in 1915, is found in northwestern Venezuela and eastern Colombia
	F. s. caucae	described by Frank Chapman in 1915, is found in western Colombia
	F. s. aequatorialis	described by Mearns in 1892, is found in northern Ecuador
	F. s. peruvianus	described by Cory in 1915, is found in southwestern Ecuador, Peru and northern Chile
	F. s. fernandensis	described by Chapman in 1915, is found on the Juan Fernández Islands off Chile
	F. s. cinnamominus	described by Swainson in 1837, is found in Peru, Chile and Argentina
	F. s. cearae	described by Cory in 1915, is found from northeastern Brazil south to eastern Bolivia

== Description ==
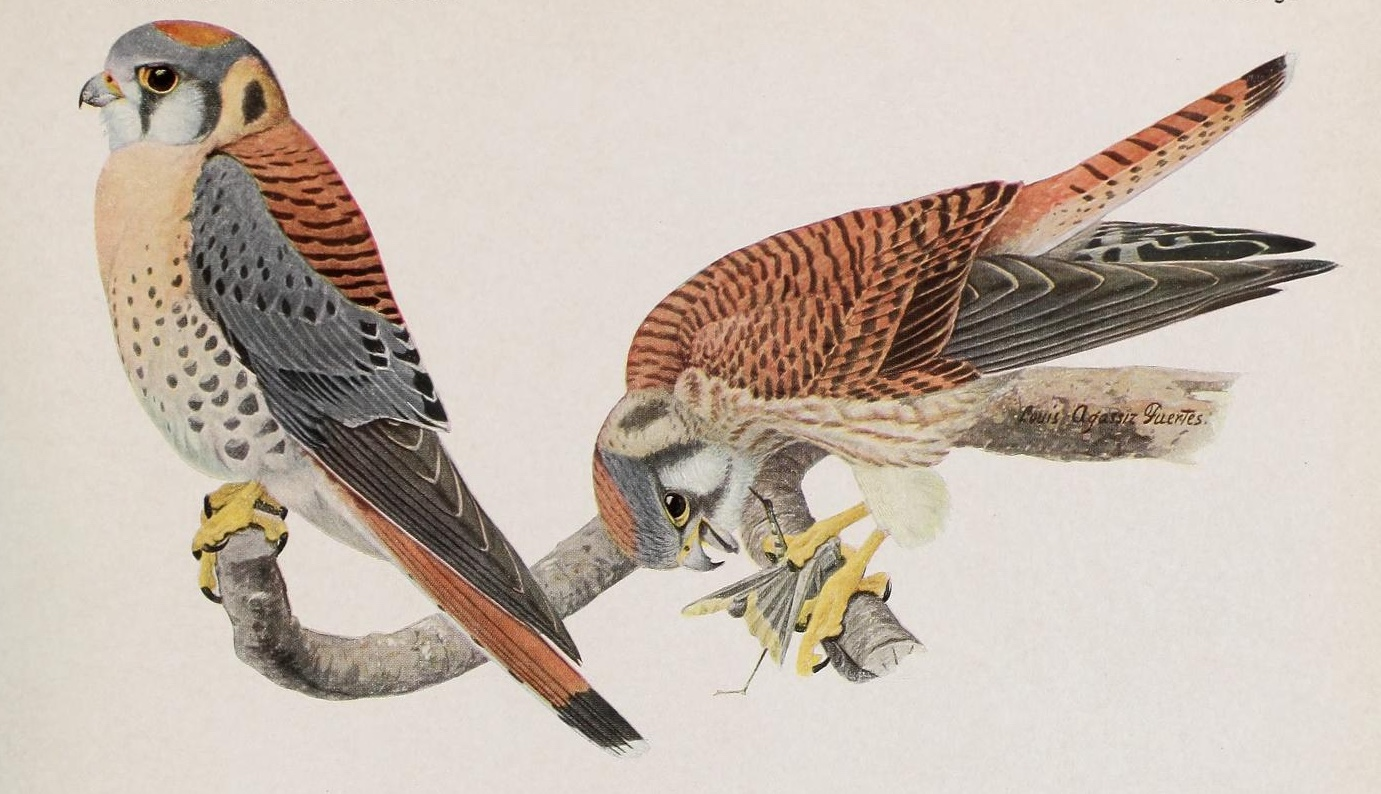
1912 illustration of the male (left) and female (right). By Louis Agassiz Fuertes.

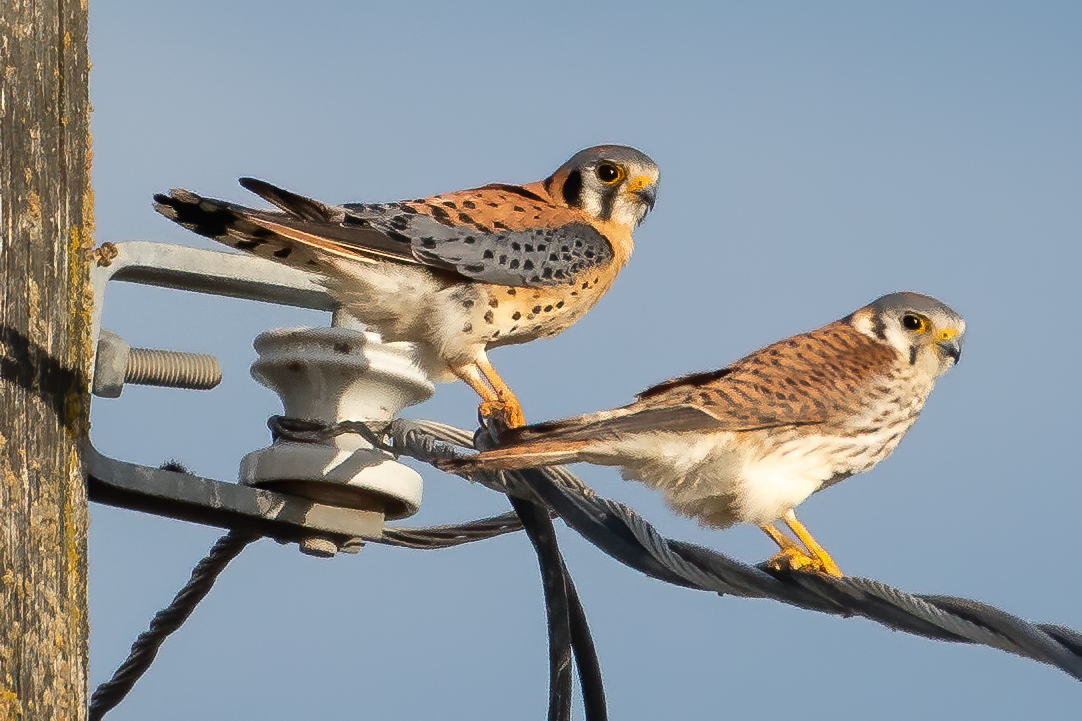
F. s. sparverius male (left) and female (right), in California

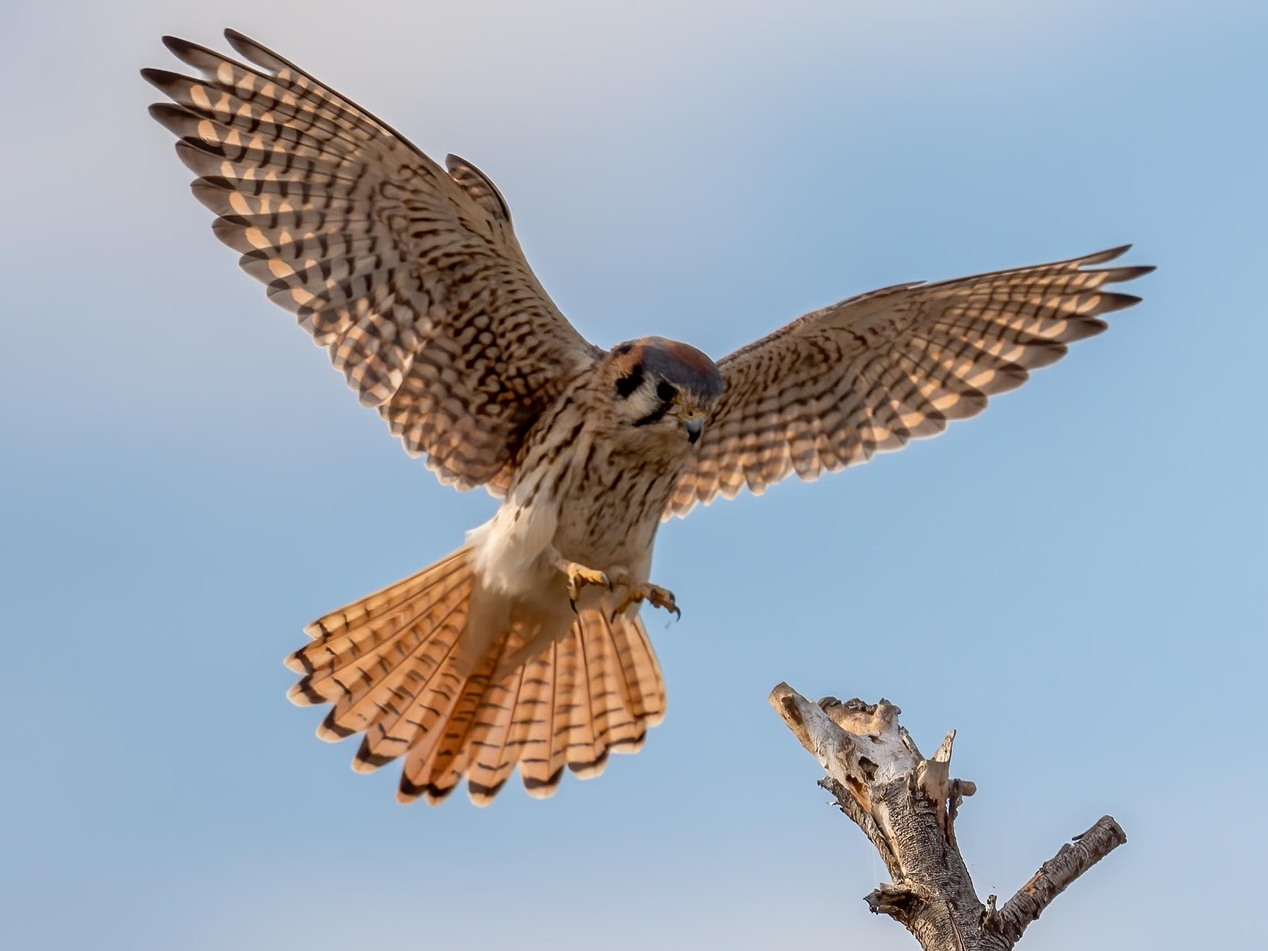
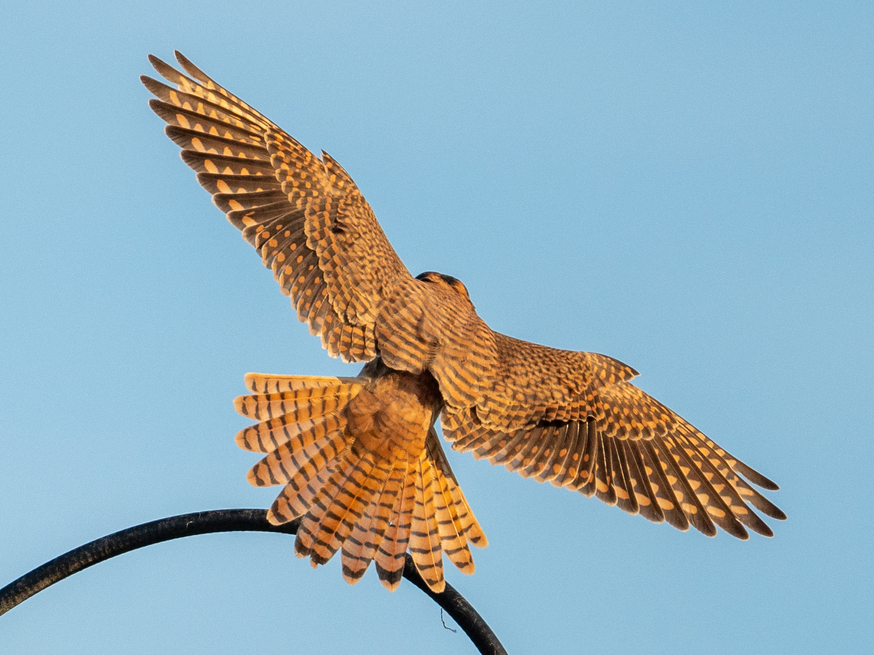
Front and back of female F. s. sparverius, in California

Under traditional terminology, the American kestrel is the smallest raptor in the Americas, though the South American spot-winged falconet is almost as small. The American kestrel is sexually dimorphic, although there is some overlap in plumage coloration between the sexes. The bird ranges from 22 to 31 cm (8.7 to 12.2 in) in length with a wingspan of 51–61 cm (20–24 in). The female kestrel is larger than the male, though less so than larger falcons, being typically about 10% to 15% larger within a subspecies. The more northern subspecies tend to larger sizes (northern hemisphere), with a large northern female being about twice the size of a small southern male. The male typically weighs 80–143 g (2.8–5.0 oz), and the female 86–165 g (3.0–5.8 oz). In standard measurements, the wing bone is 16–21 cm (6.3–8.3 in) long, the tail is 11–15 cm (4.3–5.9 in) and the tarsus is 3.2–4 cm (1.3–1.6 in).

Physically, American kestrels are leaner and less muscular than larger falcons. The pectoral flight muscles of the American kestrel make up only about 12% of its body weight, as compared to about 20% for the strongest flying falcons such as the peregrine falcon. The wings are moderately long, fairly narrow, and taper to a point. Their less muscular body type is adapted to energy-conserving ambush hunting, rather than spending large amounts of energy-consuming time on the wing and getting into long tail-chases of bird prey. For their size, they have strong talons and beaks, and can swiftly dispatch prey. Their lean build and energy-conserving strategy allow a lower daily food intake than if they were more strongly muscled, yet with enough strength to commonly take bird prey as large as themselves, and occasionally larger. The success of this body style and hunting strategy is reflected in the high success of the species in densely populating a large range throughout the Americas. The flight of the American kestrel is not so dramatic and swift as more muscular falcons such as merlins and peregrines, but their efficient adaptation to a broader diet of more available smaller prey, and need for less food per day, has resulted in their greater population.

In contrast to many other raptor species, the sexes differ more in plumage than in size. Males have blue-gray wings with black spots and white undersides with black barring. The back is rufous, with barring on the lower half. The belly and flanks are white with black spotting. The tail is also rufous, with a white or rufous tip and a black subterminal band. The back and wings of the female American kestrel are rufous with dark brown barring. The undersides of the females are creamy to buff with heavy brown streaking. The tail is noticeably different from the male's, being rufous in color with numerous narrow dark black bars. Juveniles exhibit coloration patterns similar to the adults'. In both sexes, the head is white with a bluish-gray top. There are also two narrow, vertical black facial markings on each side of the head, while other falcons have one. Two black spots (ocelli) can be found on each side of the white or orangish nape. The function of these spots is debated, but the most commonly accepted theory is that they act as "false eyes", and help to protect the bird from potential attackers.

=== Vocalizations ===
The American kestrel has three basic vocalizations – the "klee" or "killy", the "whine", and the "chitter". The "klee" is usually delivered as a rapid series – klee, klee, klee, klee when the kestrel is upset or excited. This call is used in a wide variety of situations and is heard from both sexes, but the larger females typically have lower-pitched voices than the males. The "whine" call is primarily associated with feeding but is also uttered during copulation. The "chitter" is used in activities that involve interaction between male and female birds, including courtship feeding, copulation, and the feeding of nestlings. Nestlings can produce calls similar to those of adults at 16 days old.

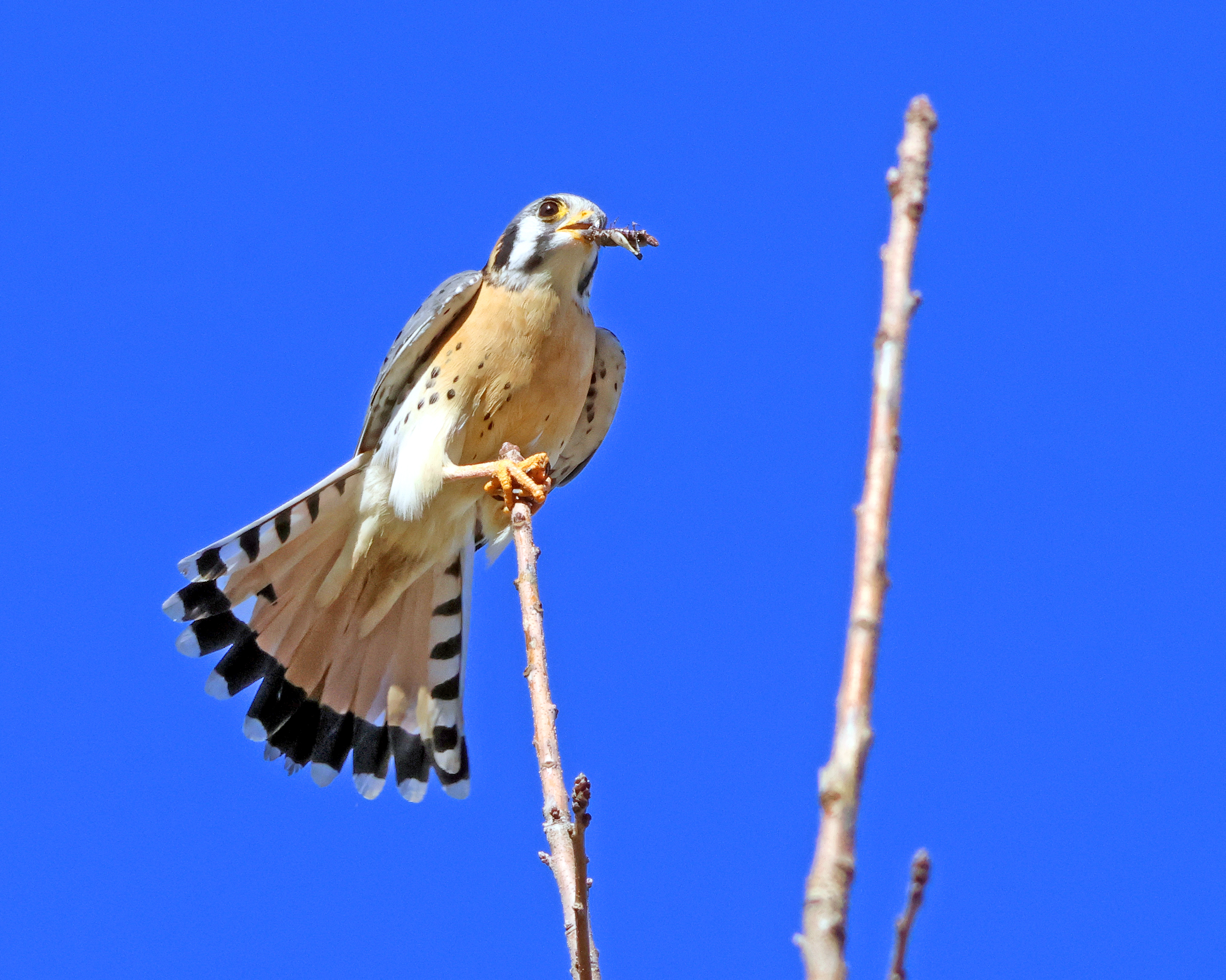
Male showing the tail underside

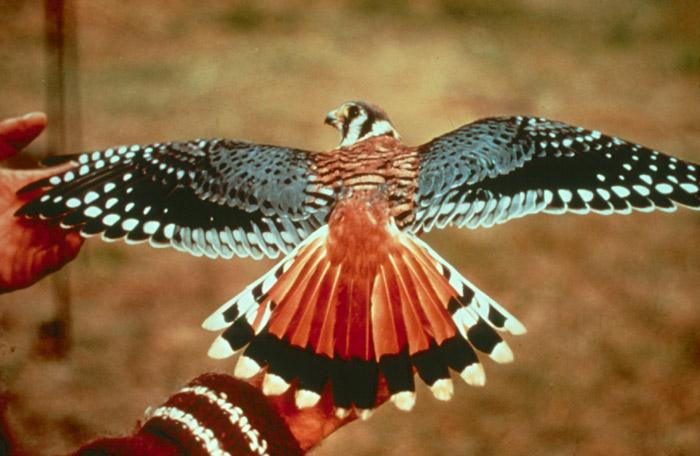
Male upperparts pattern

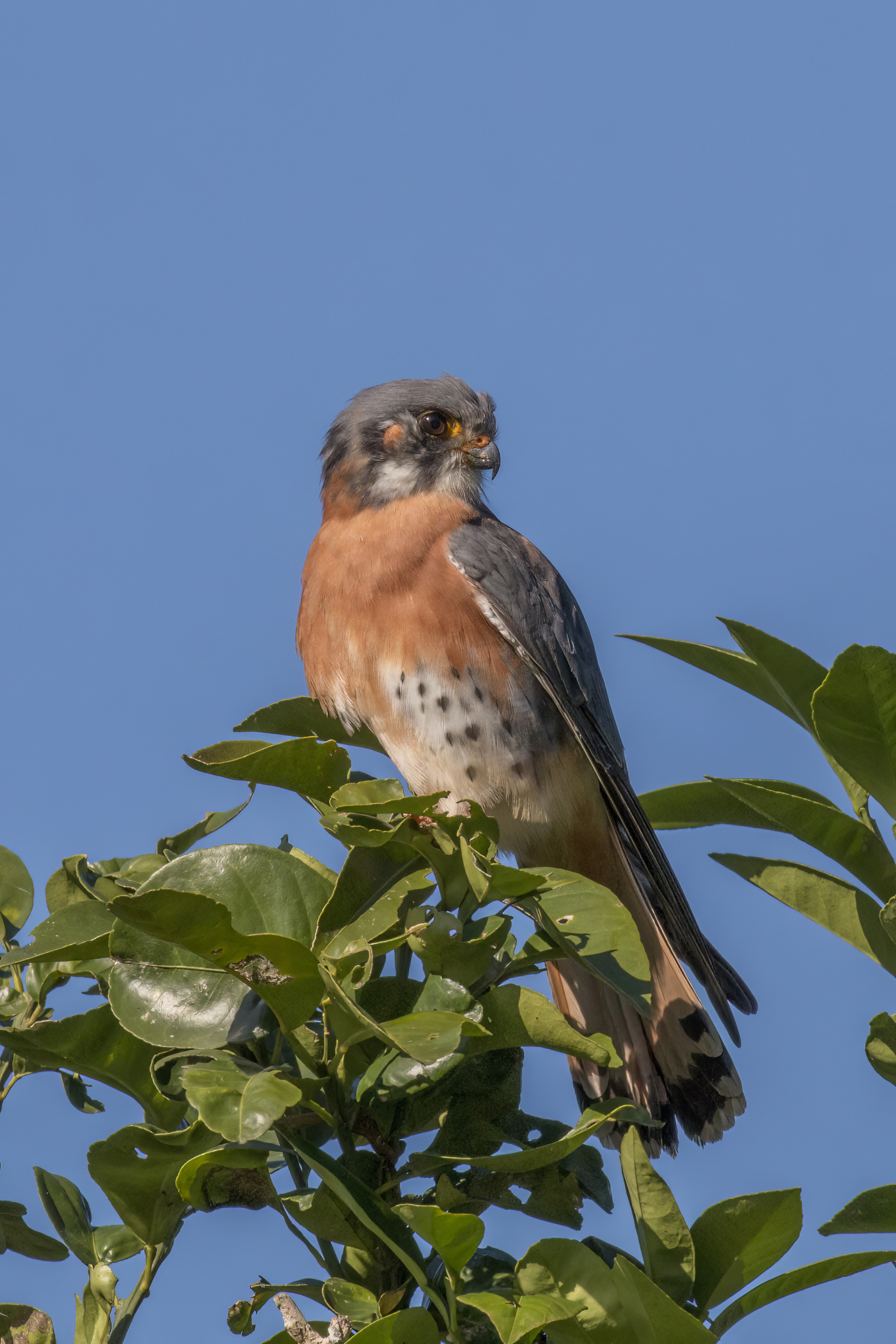
F. s. sparveroides
male red morph, Cuba

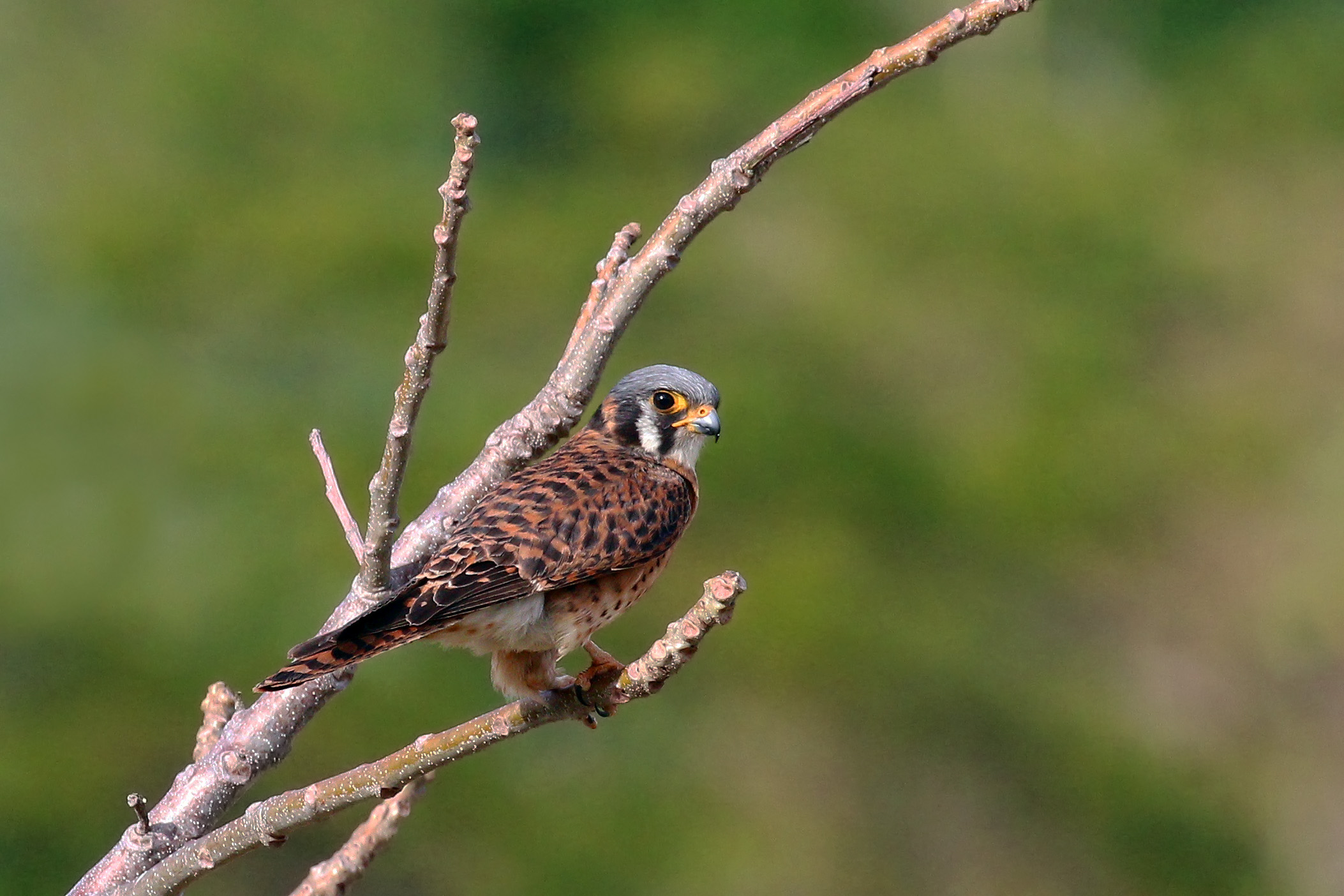
F. s. sparveroides
female white morph, Cuba

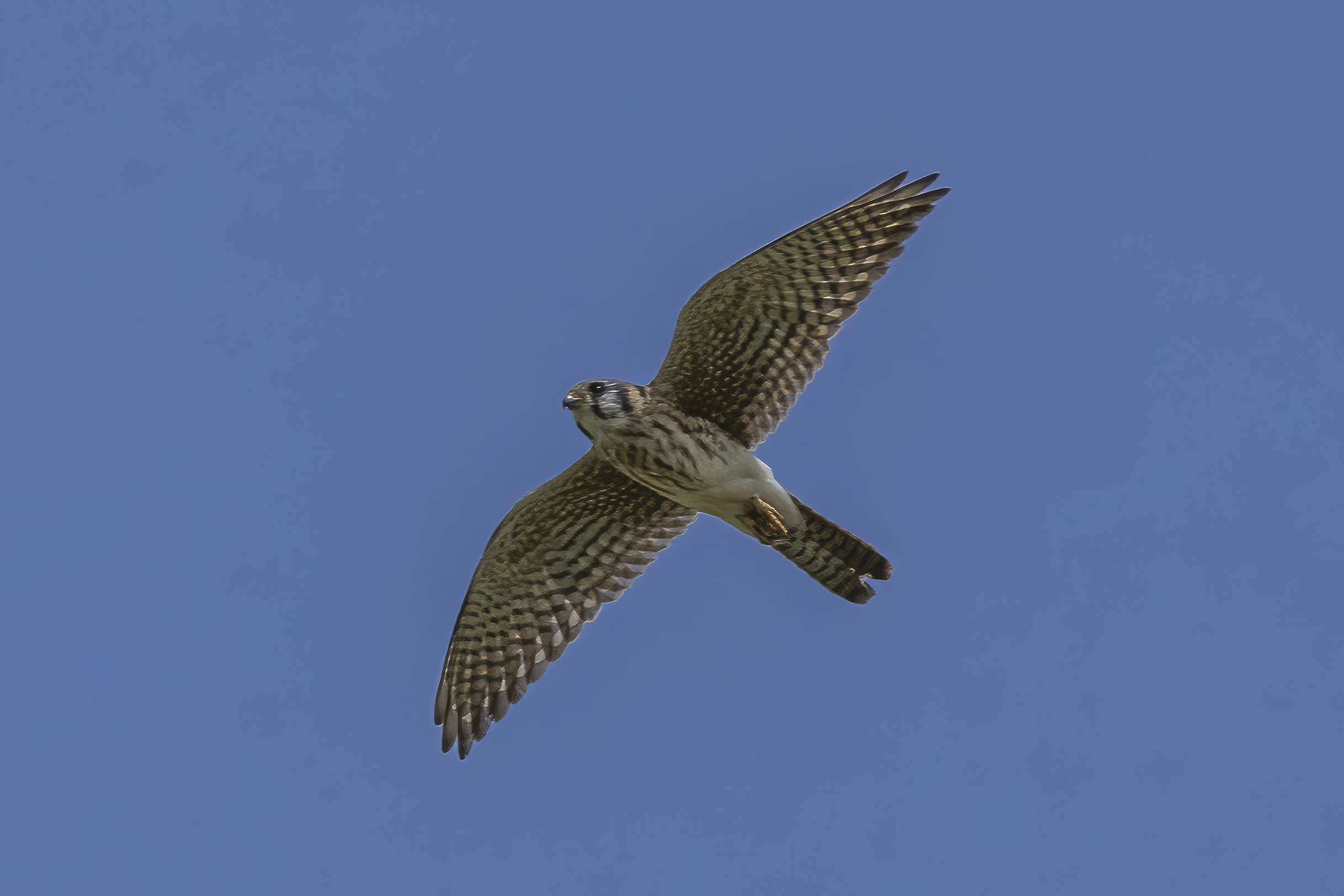
Female F. s. tropicalis in Belize

== Ecology and behavior ==
American kestrels are found in a wide variety of habitats, including grasslands, meadows, deserts and other open to semi-open regions. They can also be found in both urban and suburban areas. A kestrel's habitat must include perches, open space for hunting, and cavities for nesting (whether natural or man-made). The American kestrel is able to live in very diverse conditions, ranging from above the Arctic Circle, to the tropics of Central America, to elevations of over 4,500 m (14,800 ft) in the Andes Mountains. The bird is distributed from northern Canada and Alaska to the southernmost tip of South America, Tierra del Fuego. It is the only kestrel found in the Americas, though as mentioned above this classification is genetically inaccurate. It has occurred as a vagrant in the UK, Denmark, Malta and the Azores.

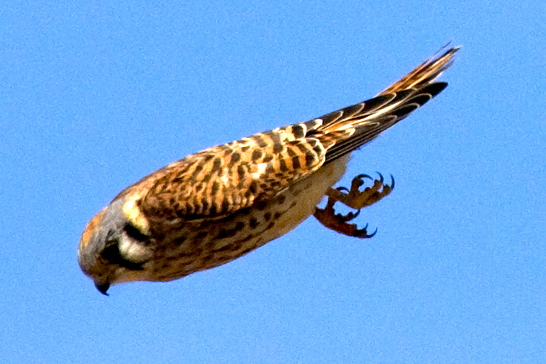
Female about to pounce

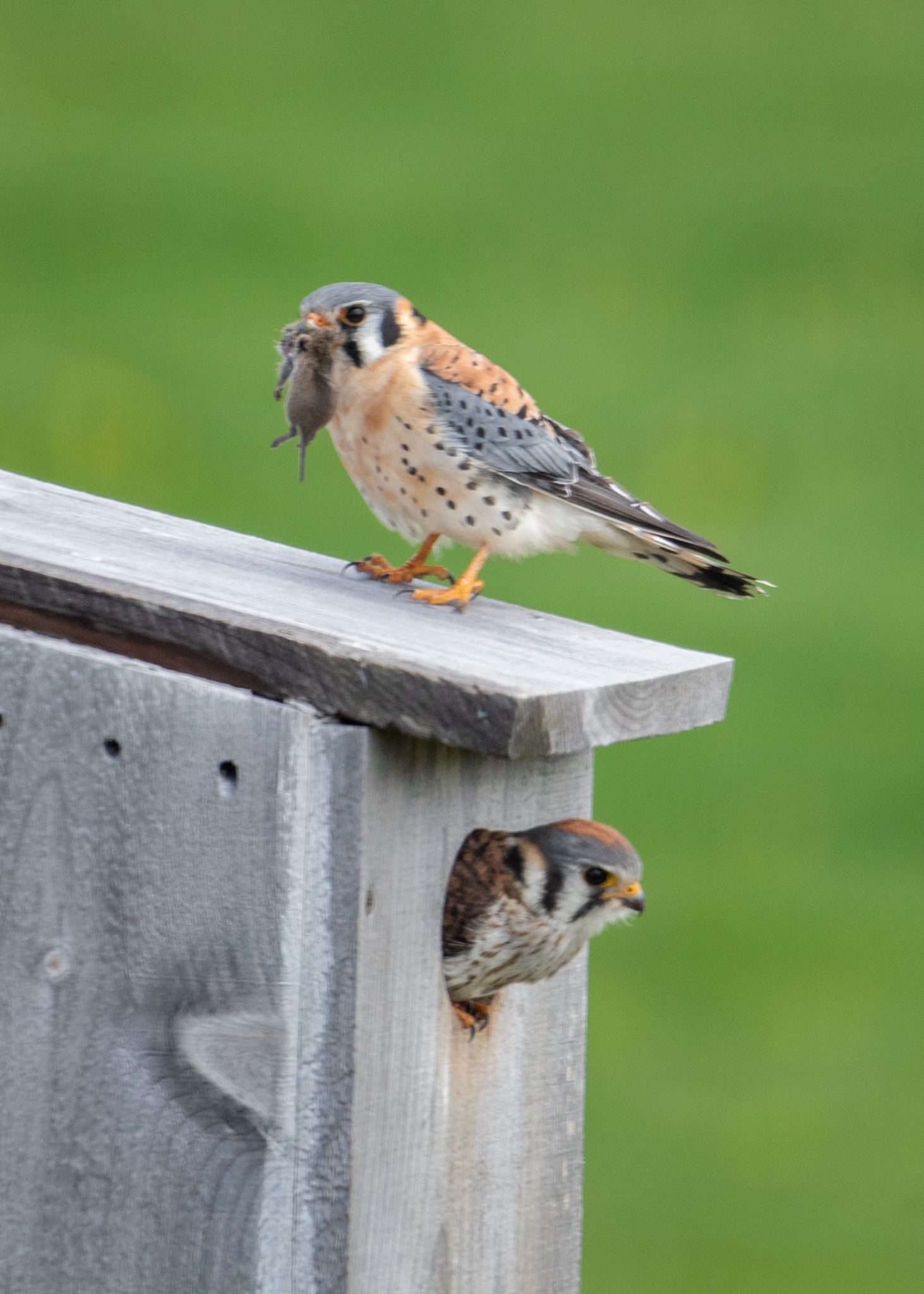
Male showing female a nest box and offering mouse – Maine

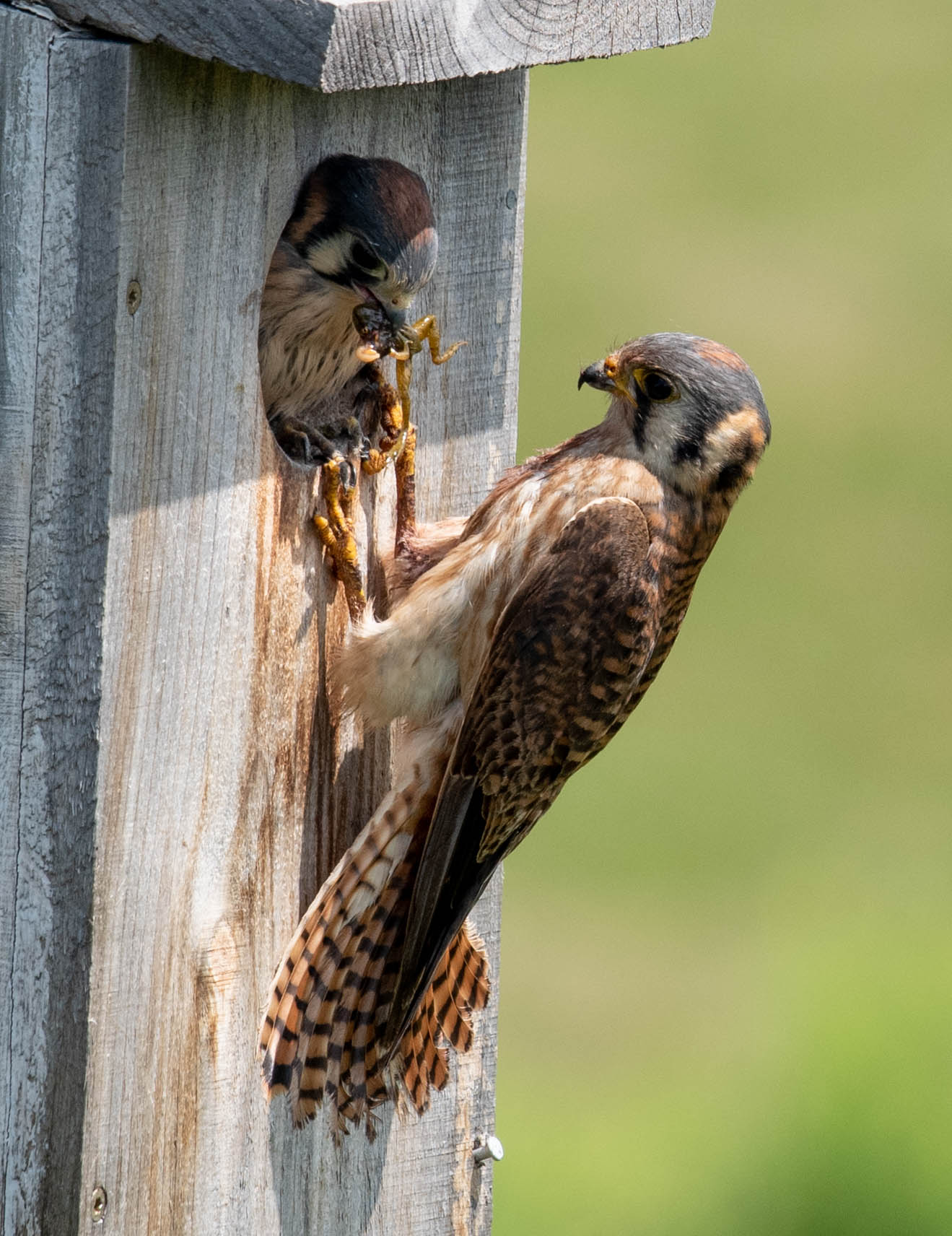
Female feeding nestling – Maine

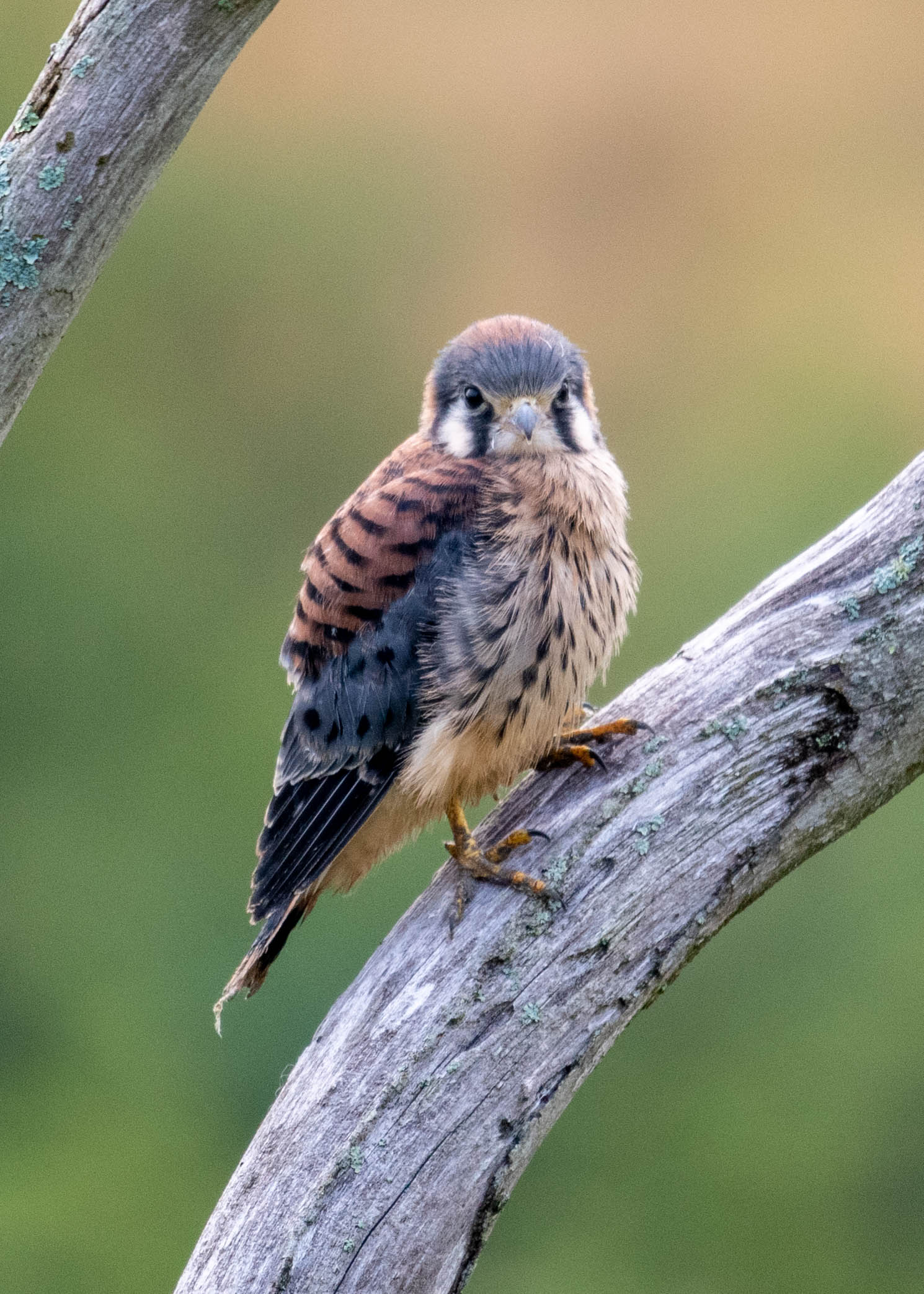
Just fledged male – Maine

American kestrels in Canada and the northern United States typically migrate south in the winter, some of them converging with resident kestrels of smaller size in Mexico, sometimes going as far as Central America and the Caribbean. Birds that breed south of about 35° north latitude are usually year-round residents. Migration also depends on local weather conditions. American Kestrels breeding at lower latitudes – below 48ºN to be precise – arrive earlier after warmer springs, whereas birds from higher latitudes return to their breeding grounds at the same time each year. These patterns suggest that short-distance migrants are better able to cope with climate change. Wintering kestrels' choice of habitat varies by sex. Females are found in open areas more often than males during the non-breeding season. A common explanation for this behavior is that the larger females who are bigger than the males arrive at the preferred habitat first and exclude males from their territory.

The American kestrel is not long-lived, with a lifespan of <5 years for wild birds. The oldest banded wild bird was 11 years and 7 months, while captive kestrels can live up to 14–17 years. In a study, humans accounted for 43.2% of 1,355 reported deaths, which included direct killing and roadkills, while predation (including by larger birds of prey) accounted for 2.8%. This statistic is likely biased, however, as reported deaths are usually found near or in areas populated by humans.

In Florida, American kestrels may be eaten by some growth stage of invasive snakes such as Burmese pythons, reticulated pythons, Southern African rock pythons, Central African rock pythons, boa constrictors, yellow anacondas, Bolivian anacondas, dark-spotted anacondas, and green anacondas.

=== Feeding ===
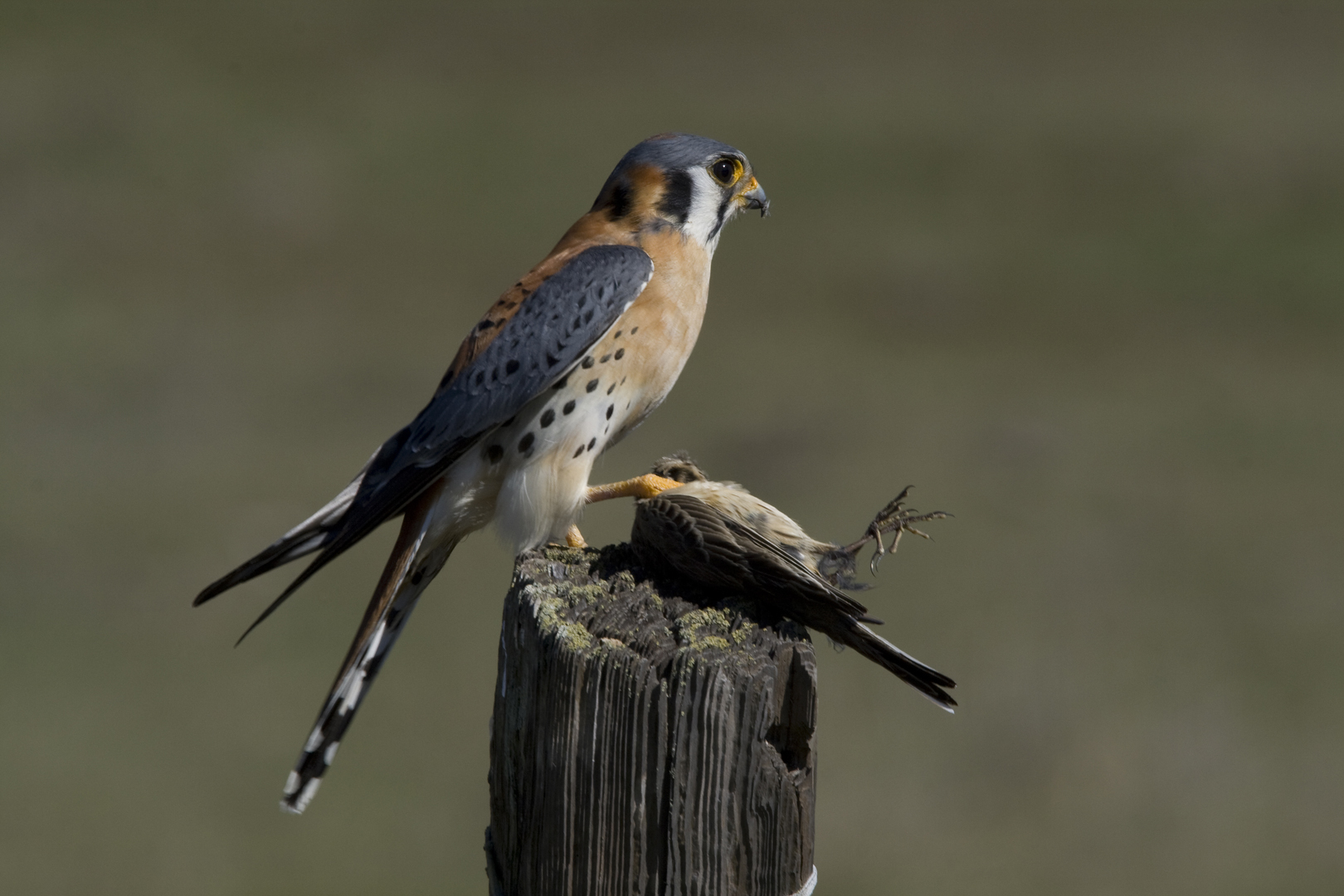
Male F. s. sparverius feeding on an American pipit, in California

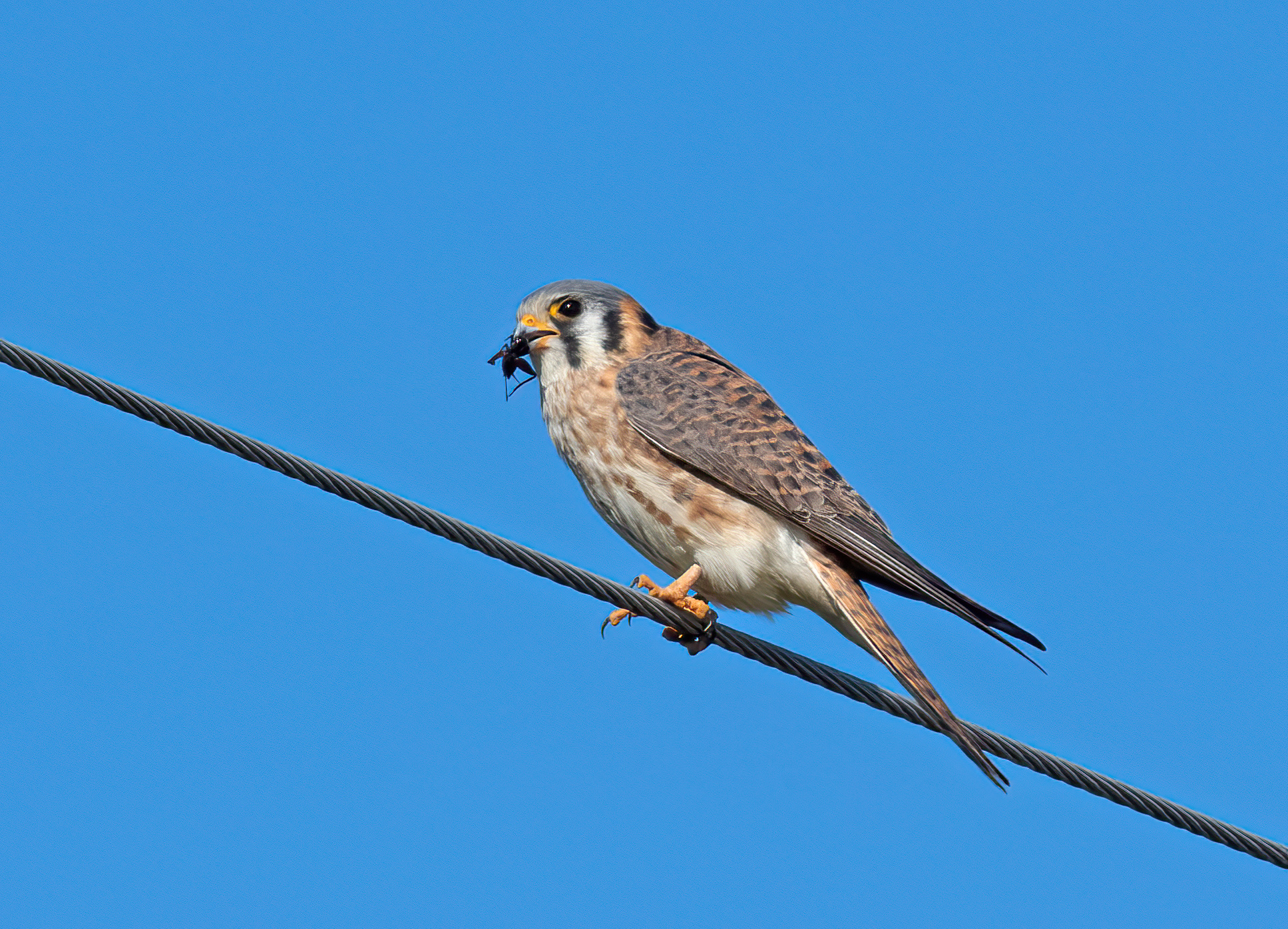
Female F. s. sparverius feeding on a cricket, in South Carolina

American kestrels feed largely on small animals such as grasshoppers, crickets, butterflies, moths, dragonflies, beetles, lizards, mice, voles, shrews, frogs, and small birds. The kestrel has also been reported to have killed scorpions, snakes, bats, and squirrels. The kestrel is able to maintain high population densities, at least in part because of the broad scope of its diet. The American kestrel's primary mode of hunting is by perching and waiting for prey to come near. The bird is characteristically seen along roadsides or fields perched on objects such as trees, overhead power lines, or fence posts. It also hunts by kiting, hovering in the air with rapid wing beats and scanning the ground for prey. Other hunting techniques include low flight over fields, or chasing insects and birds in the air.

Prey is most often caught on the ground, though occasionally they take birds in flight. Before striking, the kestrel characteristically bobs its head and tail, then makes a direct flight toward the prey to grab it in its talons. Much like the red-tailed hawk, American kestrels conserve energy in a hunt and pick their attacks with care as to position and odds of success. During the breeding season, the bird will carry large prey back to its mate or young. One study found that an American kestrel pair "foraged in ways that minimized the costs of energy acquisition in its particular situation". For example, if the success rate for catching prey decreases significantly in a particular area, the bird will move to a different area.

=== Reproduction ===
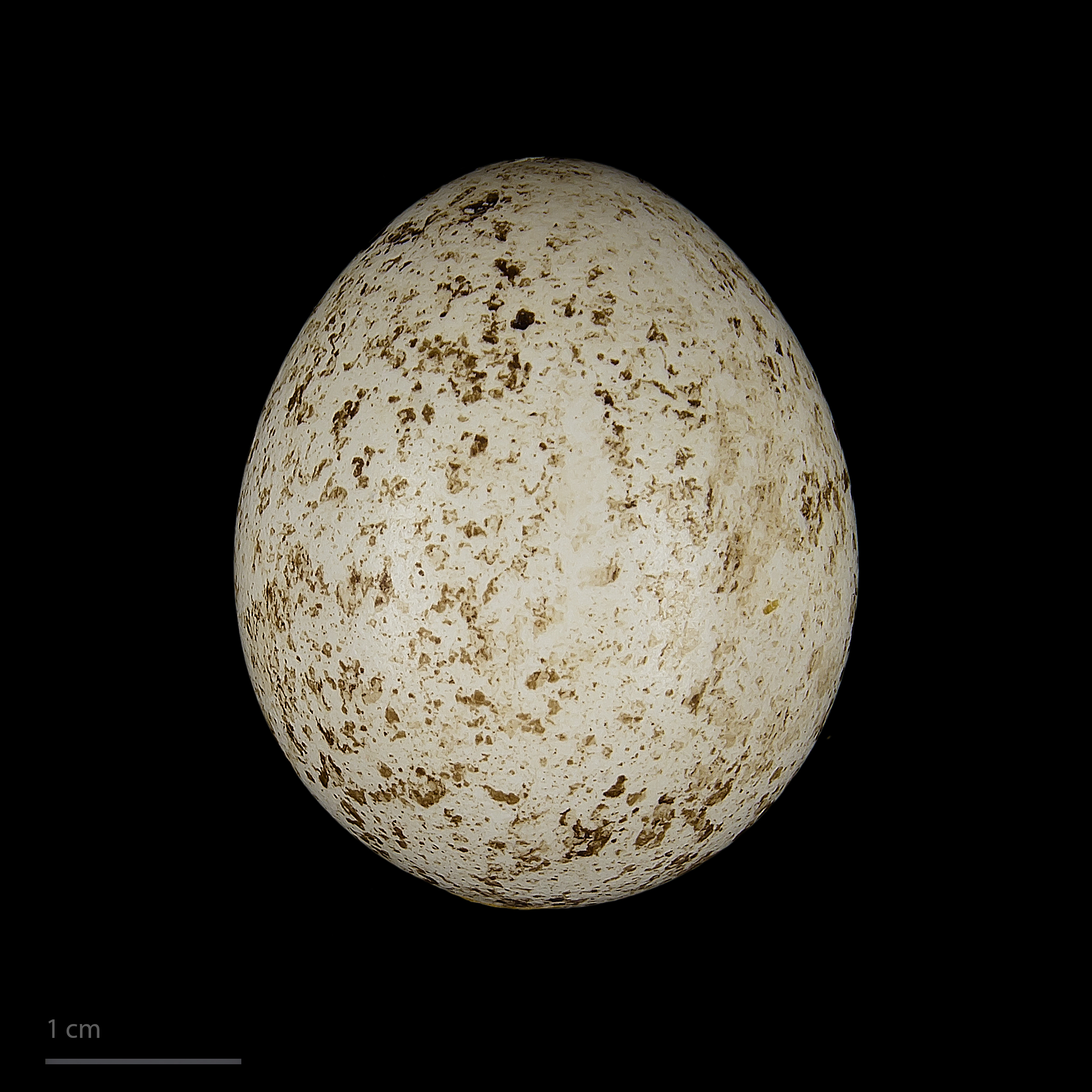
Egg, at the MHNT

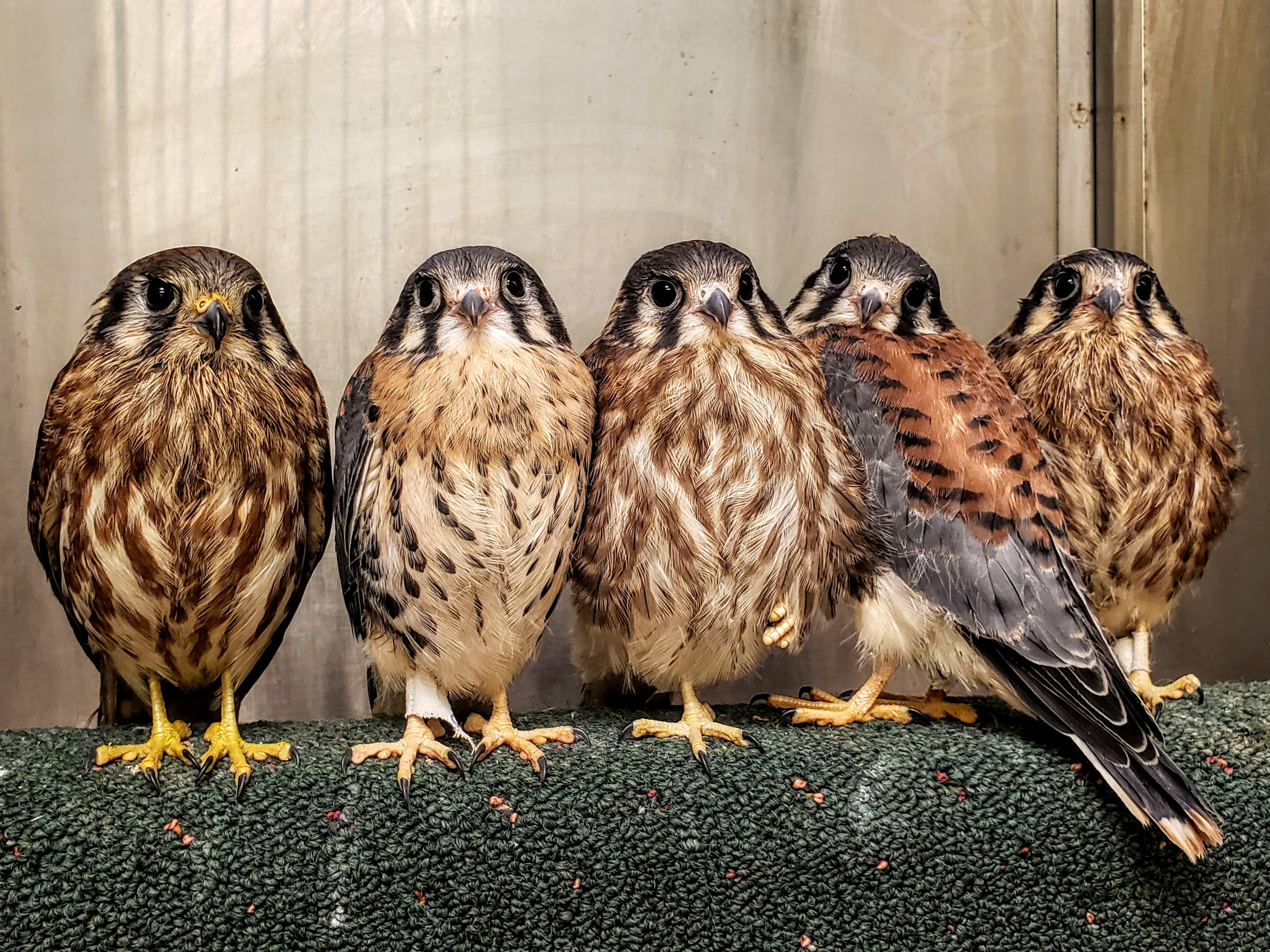
Rescued fledglings, showing the sexually dimorphic plumage between 2 males and 3 females. In New York.

American kestrels are sexually mature by their first spring. In migratory populations, the males arrive at the breeding ground before females, then the female selects a mate. Pair bonds are strong, often permanent. Pairs usually use previous nesting sites in consecutive years. This gives birds an advantage over younger or invading individuals, as they would already be familiar with the hunting grounds, neighbors, predators, and other features of the site. Males perform elaborate dive displays to advertise their territory and attract a mate. These displays consist of several climbs and dives, with three or four "klee" calls at their peaks. Females are promiscuous for about one to two weeks after their arrival at the nesting site. This is thought to stimulate ovulation. Food transfers from the male to the female occur from about four to five weeks prior to egg laying to one to two weeks after.

American kestrels are cavity nesters, but they are able to adapt to a wide variety of nesting situations. They generally prefer natural cavities (such as in trees) with closed tops and tight-fitting entrances that provide for maximum protection of the eggs and young. Kestrels occasionally nest in holes created by large woodpeckers, or use the abandoned nests of other birds, such as red-tailed hawks, merlins, and crows. They have been recorded nesting on cliff ledges and building tops, as well as in abandoned cavities in cactuses. American kestrels also commonly utilize nesting boxes.

Three to seven eggs (typically four or five) are laid approximately 24–72 hours apart. (Two supernormal clutches of eight eggs and one of nine have been documented. One egg in one of the eight-egg clutches hatched as did one egg in the nine-egg clutch.) The average egg size is 32 mm × 29 mm (1.3 in × 1.1 in), 10% larger than average for birds of its body size. The eggs are white to cream in color with brown or gray splotching. Incubation usually lasts 30 days and is mainly the responsibility of the female, although the male incubates 15–20% of the time. Eggs that are lost are typically replaced in 11–12 days. Hatching takes place over three to four days. Hatchlings are altricial, and are only able to sit up after five days. They grow rapidly, reaching an adult weight after 16–17 days. After 28–31 days, their wings have developed and they are able to leave the nest. The young adult kestrels may breed from a year old, and the species has approximately a three to five-year life expectancy in the wild.

In ecological terms, the reproductive pattern of the American kestrel leans towards a small bird "r selection" strategy. In r/K selection theory, selective pressures are hypothesized to drive evolution in one of two generalized directions: r or K selection. R-selected species are those that place an emphasis on a high growth rate, typically exploiting less-crowded ecological niches, and produce many offspring, each of which has a relatively low probability of surviving to adulthood (i.e., high r, low K). By contrast, K-selected species display traits associated with living at densities close to carrying capacity, and typically are strong competitors in such crowded niches that invest more heavily in fewer offspring, each of which has a relatively high probability of surviving to adulthood (i.e., low r, high K). Between these two extremes, the American kestrel is one of the few raptor species that lean towards being r-selected. They are able to breed at one year old, have few non-breeding adults in the population, and have larger broods. Their population growth rate is high relative to larger raptors, which typically lean towards being K-selected. This said, older American kestrel pairs generally have larger brood sizes and produce more viable offspring than younger conspecifics.

== Stress physiology ==
=== Weather ===
American kestrels are often useful in scientific studies on animal physiology, and are typically captured using the bal-chatri method or raised in nest boxes for experiments. Kestrel metabolic rate has been found to increase in response to rainfall, and at ambient temperatures below about 25 °C. Kestrel metabolic responses to weather and temperature do not vary, however, with sex. Kestrels will increase their oxygen consumption, and therefore their metabolic rate in cold and wet conditions to counteract heat loss.

=== Environmental disturbance ===
American kestrels' response to environmental stress is measured as blood concentration of corticosterone (CORT), a hormone produced by the hypothalamic-pituitary-adrenal (HPA) axis that releases stored energy for essential body functions. Extended periods of elevated blood CORT levels may direct metabolic energy away from growth and reproduction. Thus, high levels of traffic disturbance and human development surrounding American kestrel nests are found to increase stress hormones leading to reproductive failure. Among successful nests, however, nestlings do not typically experience a higher stress response to environmental human disturbance, suggesting that they can tolerate a considerable degree of human activity near the nest.

=== Environmental contaminants ===
Since American kestrels are carnivores, toxic chemical runoff ingested by their prey can concentrate at high levels in their blood. Wild kestrels are subject to immunomodulation, or an altered immune response, to polybrominated diphenyl ethers (PBDEs), a group of industrial flame retardants that may leach from factories into the environment. When PBDEs accumulate in body tissues of kestrels, the T-cell mediated immune response decreases in efficiency. As a result, kestrels that ingest PBDEs may not respond sufficiently to viruses or other invading microorganisms. In addition, certain PBDEs may suppress the growth and development of the spleen and bursa in American kestrels.

While PBDEs can affect immune response and suppress growth of certain organs, they can also affect the thyroid system of American Kestrels. Exposure to PBDEs in vivo can alter the thyroid system and retinol concentrations in kestrels. This leads to oxidative stress, lipid peroxidation, and changes in glutathione metabolism. These systems are important in early development, growth, regulation of metabolism, thermoregulation, and reproduction. Oxidative stress is also known to contribute to cancers and neurological diseases.

Exposure to polychlorinated biphenyls (PCBs) might also affect American Kestrel reproduction. It was found that PCBs affect the function of carotenoids in kestrels. This led to changes in coloration, especially during breeding season for adults. PCB-exposed males where duller and contributed less to egg incubation than unexposed males. PCB-exposed females kept their color longer than they should have. Normally, loss in color is associated with carotenoids being directed to ovaries to help in egg development. PCB-exposed females retained their colors longer, suggesting the PCBs made them less prepared for reproduction. The same females also had significant delays in egg laying. Offspring also showed higher incidence of developmental problems and decreased reproductive success.

PCBs have also been found to affect eye color in American Kestrels. Eye color in kestrels is known to vary with age and sex, however, when exposed to PCBs, color patterns were suppressed regardless of age and sex. While it is unknown what role eye color plays in visual acuity, this may be of greater concern to birds like kestrels who rely heavily on vision for hunting.

PDBEs were linked to changes in breeding behavior in kestrels as well. Different levels of PDBE exposure were linked to different changes in behavior as well. Overall, PDBE exposure led to changes in behaviors that strengthen the bond between a breeding pair. Such behaviors include frequent copulation, food transfers, male posturing, nest box inspection, and specific mating calls (7). High exposure levels led to increases in some behaviors and decreases in some, whereas low exposure caused decreases in almost all behaviors observed. PDBE exposure also altered the timing of these behaviors, often delaying them by several days when compared to the control group.

American Kestrels have also been used extensively in toxicology research. Fenthion is a common pesticide that is used to kill insects such as flies and gnats. It was also found that kestrels are highly susceptible to secondary fenthion poisoning. When 14 kestrels were presented with live sparrows who had come into contact with a fenthion solution, all 14 died within 3 days after consuming the sparrows.

Diphacinone is another common pesticide that is often used to kill rodents and is thought to be related to secondary poisoning in birds of prey. When kestrels were orally dosed with diphacinone, blood clotting rates significantly decreases. Kestrels were also found to be 20 to 30 times more sensitive to secondary poisoning from diphacinone than other birds like Northern bobwhite and mallard ducks.

The species has been used to monitor metals (Cd, Sn, Pb, Cu, Al, Hg) and metalloids (As) in western North American drylands using feathers as a suitable tool to measure environmental pollution. American kestrels can also be significantly influenced by air contaminants. When exposed to common gaseous pollutants such as benzene, toluene, nitrogen dioxide, and sulfur dioxide, significant changes to the thyroid systems were observed. Higher levels of thyroid activity indicate that exposure to these gases leads to a loss of inhibition of thyroid glands in kestrels. However, there were no changes to immune function or food consumption.

== Status and conservation ==
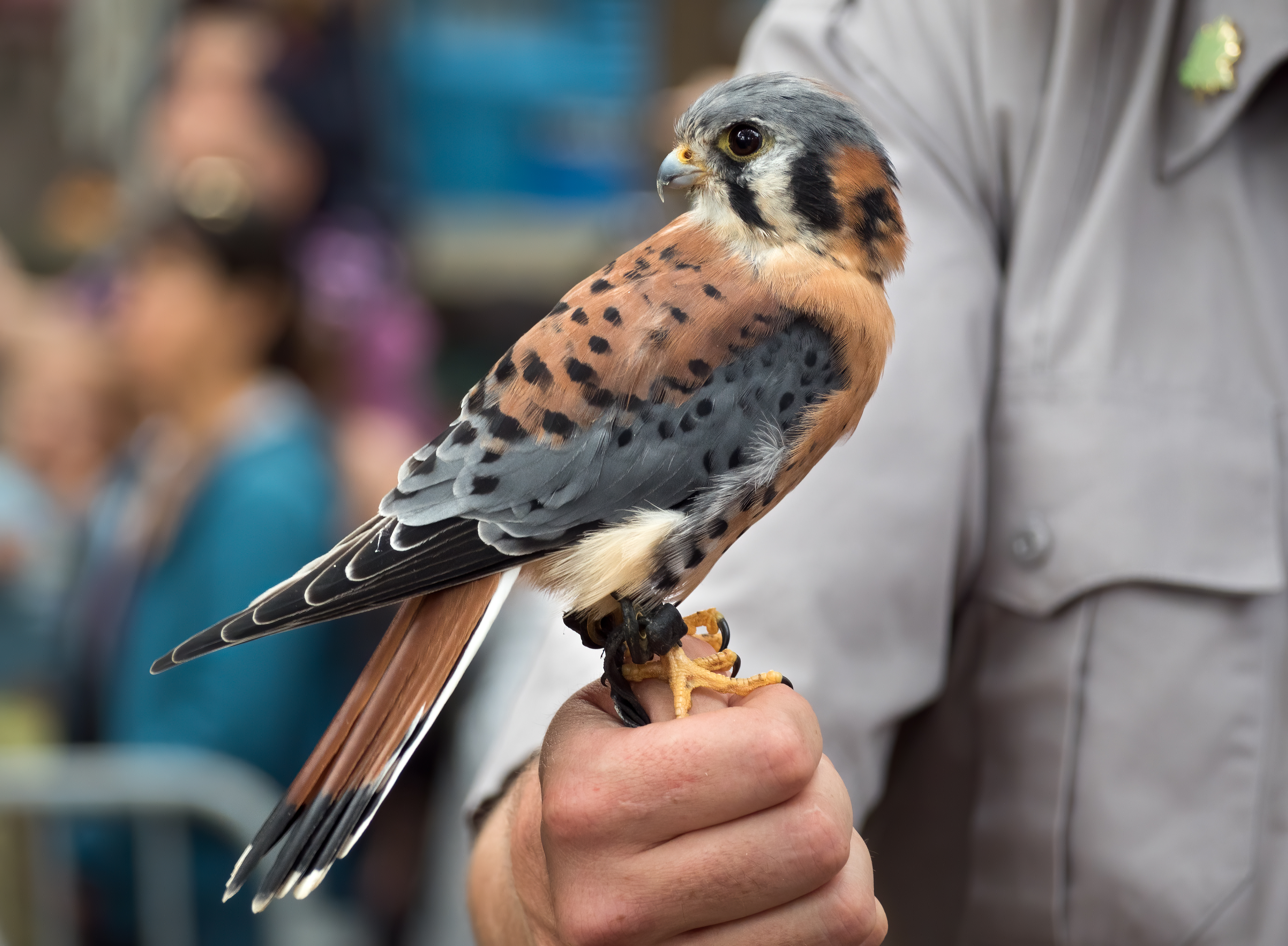
A rehabilitated male American kestrel with handler at an educational event

The American kestrel is likely the most abundant falcon in North America, although its total population is difficult to quantify, as local populations can change quickly due to resource availability. Count data from the USGS Breeding Bird Survey (BBS) indicate that the North American breeding population is experiencing long-term and gradual but sustained declines, with some regions, such as New England and coastal California, exhibiting more rapid declines. Count data from raptor migration corridors also indicate regional population declines and largely corroborate BBS data. The North American population has been estimated at 1.2 million pairs, with the Central and South American populations being as large. A smaller estimate is 236,000 birds wintering in North America. A population increase occurred in the 18th and 19th centuries, probably due to deforestation for agriculture. The resulting pastures provided an ideal habitat for kestrels. As of its 2025 IUCN assessment, the global population of American kestrels is estimated to be 9.2 million mature individuals.

The southeastern U.S. subspecies (Falco sparverius paulus) has declined 82% since 1940 due to a decrease in nest site availability. This decline is a result of longleaf pines being cleared for agricultural fields. Despite this, the American kestrel is classed as least concern on the IUCN Red List.

The Peregrine Fund, a leading non-profit organization advancing research and conservation of birds of prey worldwide, launched the American Kestrel Partnership in 2012. The American Kestrel Partnership developed and maintains a web-based network for citizen and professional scientists to enter, manage, and consolidate data from kestrel nest box monitoring programs in the Western Hemisphere. The database is being used by researchers to model and understand relationships between kestrel nesting parameters (e.g., phenology, occupancy, survival, productivity, and nestling weight and exposure to environmental toxins) and environmental factors, such as land use, landscape composition and configuration, climate conditions (e.g., drought), and point sources of environmental toxins. Each breeding season, the American Kestrel Partnership features a live-streaming video feed from the nest box located at The Peregrine Fund's campus in Boise, Idaho.

== Use in falconry ==
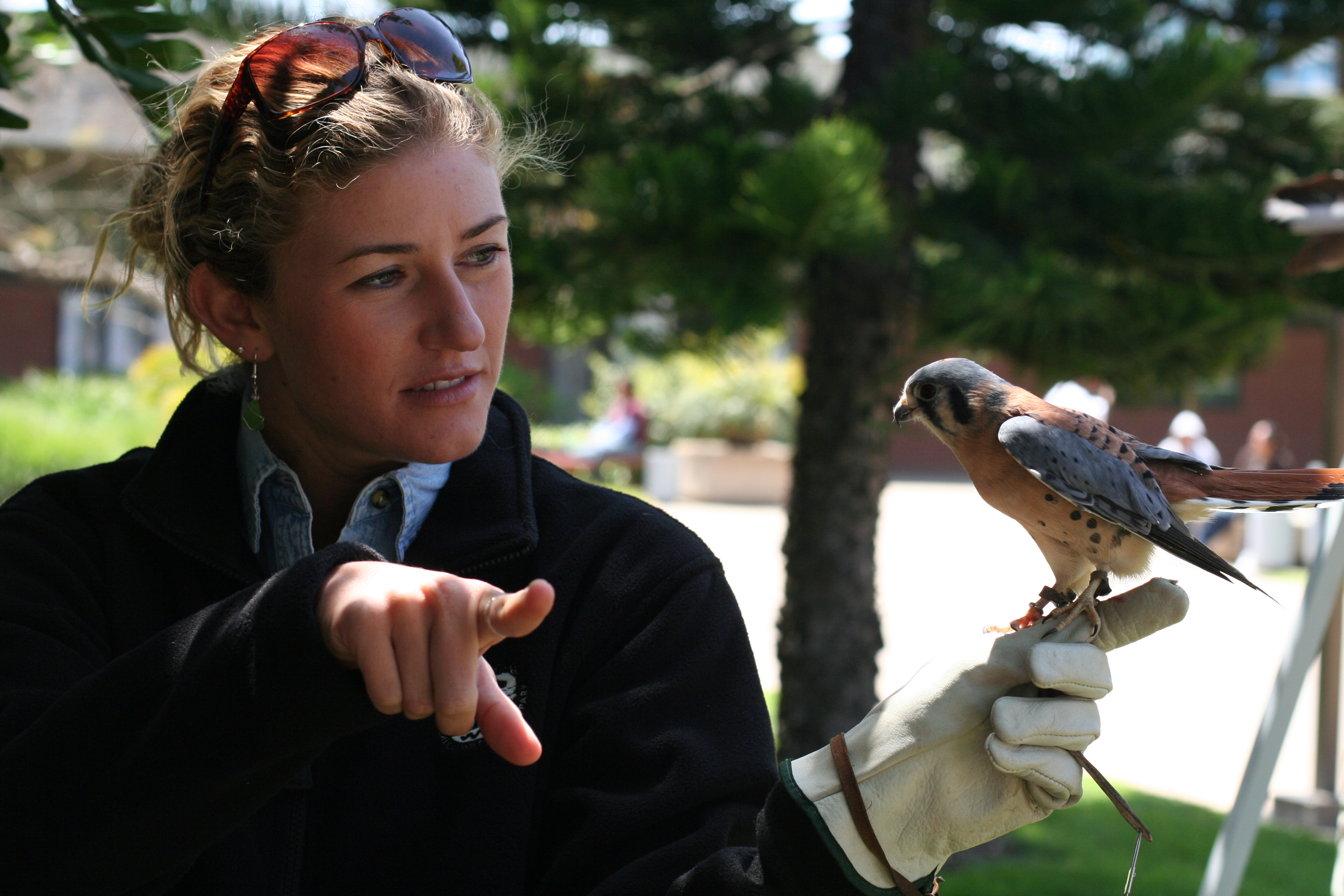
Male with handler, San Diego Zoo

One important use of American kestrels is in falconry. It is often considered a beginner's bird, though the careful weight control needed to maintain the kestrel's desire to aggressively hunt takes skill. Falconers experienced in extracting the best performance the species is capable of, report they are highly reliable on the normal game of sparrows and starlings. More aggressive individuals are sometimes capable of capturing prey up to approximately twice their own body weight, allowing the occasional capture of true game birds such as quail and dove. However, most falconers interested in the reliable taking of such game do prefer larger falcons or hawks. The advantage the American kestrel offers the experienced falconer is its suitability to simple and urban falconry not requiring large tracts of land or the use of hunting dogs. This form of falconry is sometimes referred to as "micro-falconry" or "micro-hawking". The other small raptor species commonly used in micro-falconry are the merlin, the sharp-shinned hawk (the smallest Accipiter), and the European kestrel (a true kestrel).

Hawking with the American kestrel requires adapting to the strengths and weaknesses of the bird. It is a tiny falcon, and even for its size, it is less muscular than other small falcons such as the athletic and swift merlin. It is more adapted to ambush hunting and short chases than to the longer aerial chases larger falcons often adopt. Used within its limits, it is effective. Experienced falconer Matthew Mullenix, author of the book American Kestrels in Modern Falconry, in an article comparing kestrels to merlins, summed their abilities up as follows:

1. "Kestrels are thin-winged, flat-chested, under-powered and lack acceleration compared to merlins. I say that with much affection for them and with thousands of kestrel kills to prove these are not necessarily damning differences. Comparing a red-tailed hawk to a Harris' or goshawk will conjure equally negative points of fact, yet we all know how good trained red-tails can be!"

2. "The chief variable to choosing between a kestrel and a merlin may be your hawking land. If you live in open country or have access at least to good pasture for cattle, a merlin can excel there. If you plan to hunt mostly in town or suburb, and especially if you plan to hawk from a car, I'd recommend the kestrel. The consideration coming in at close second is your intended quarry. To snipe, dove, quail and open-country sparrows, merlins are best suited. For most blackbirds (Icteridae), either falcon can prove effective. Starlings in close are extremely vulnerable to kestrels, but in the open are best prey for merlins. The same holds true for house sparrows, with this exception: sparrows in thick cover are better quarry for kestrels. This is the slip for which I feel the American kestrel is perfect."

3. "Once committed to an attack, trained kestrels tend to follow through to the end. They will stoop into cover, chase birds on foot, bind to quarry twice their size, and never let go voluntarily. They have small feet, but as written elsewhere, also have the strongest feet for their size. It is a simple fact that American kestrels hold starlings better than merlins, on average, and will gladly tackle larger quarry than will any jack (male merlin)."

American kestrels do not train so easily as some larger falcons (particularly the peregrine falcon) in the art of "waiting on" to perform a diving stoop on flushed prey. However, some individual kestrels do master this skill. Falconers sometimes train them to climb to a stooping position with tidbits on kites or balloons that the kestrels learn to climb after. More common hunting techniques are to "slip" them after spotted game from the fist, or to release them from a vehicle window close to spotted quarry. These techniques are more of a natural fit to the kestrel's ambushing methods in the wild.

Falconers using the American kestrel should be alert to protect the falcon from larger predators that may attack the kestrel, particularly if it is distracted on the ground with captured prey. Domestic cats and dogs are the greatest threat to attack the falcon on the ground, but Cooper's hawk is well known to boldly attack kestrels. This mid-sized American Astur has sufficient size and strength to carry the kestrel away, though falconers have reported often being successful in recovering the kestrel unharmed by acting quickly to intimidate the larger hawk into releasing the kestrel.

American kestrels are bred in captivity for use in falconry and are among the easier falcons to breed. They are also sufficiently common that "passage" birds in their first year are relatively easy to trap. Wild-caught kestrels "tame down" fairly quickly. They will usually be eating from a falconer's hand the day after capture, be training within a week, and be ready to hunt in three to five weeks. A very tame American kestrel will allow itself to be picked up around the body with one hand while accepting tidbits from the other hand. Such tameness is very useful when checking or treating the bird for injury or illness.

Migratory raptors native to the United States are protected by the Migratory Bird Treaty Act of 1918, so American kestrels are illegal to possess without a permit (such as a falconry permit) in the United States, Canada, and Mexico.

== Cited books ==
- Mullenix, Matthew (2002). American Kestrels in Modern Falconry. Western Sporting Publications. ISBN 978-1-888357-05-9.
- Wauer, Roland H. (2005). The American kestrel: falcon of many names. Boulder, CO: Johnson Books. ISBN 978-1-55566-353-7.
