= Nathan Clifford Brown =

American ornithologist (1856–1941)

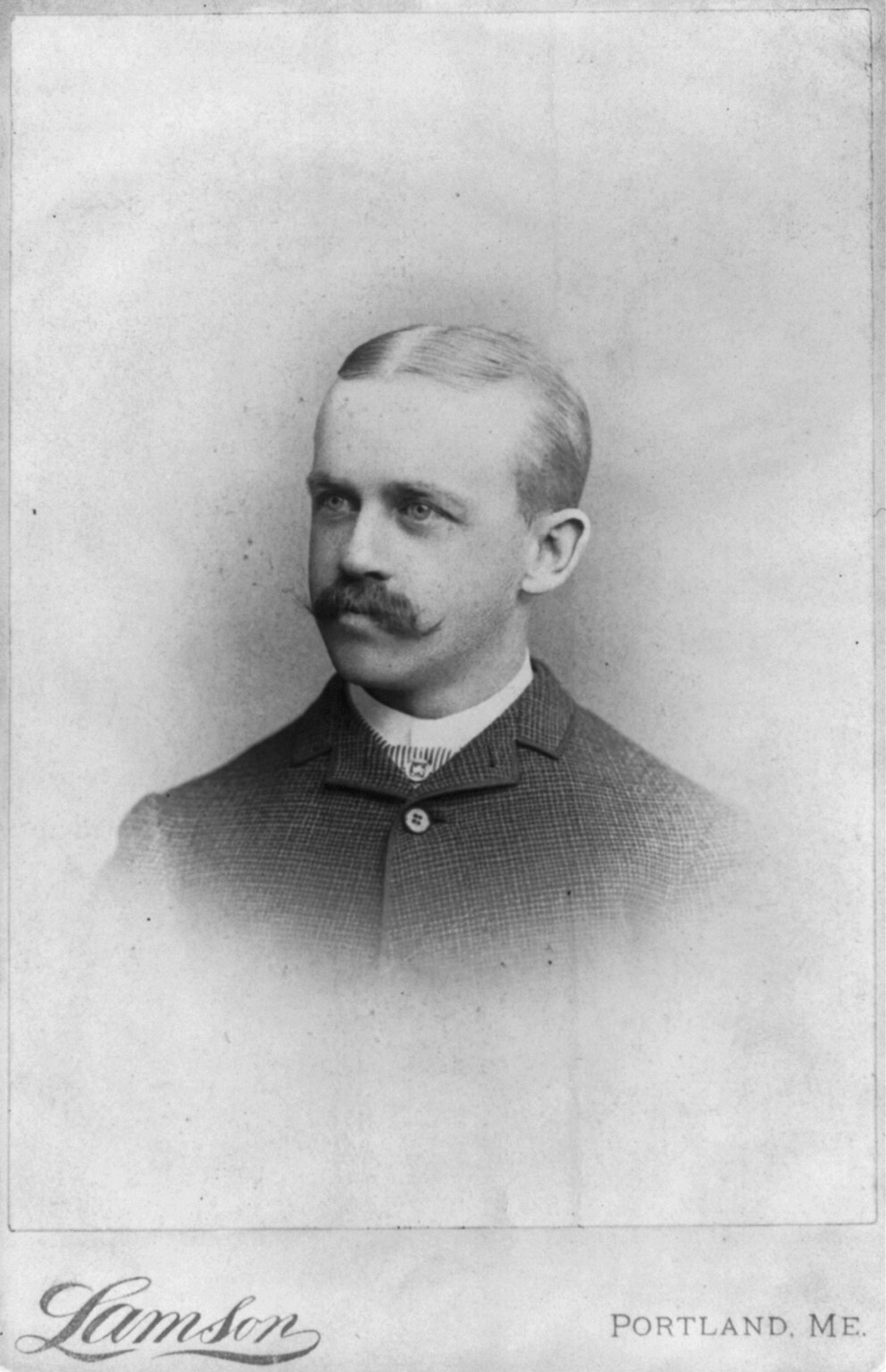

Nathan Clifford Brown (October 13, 1856 – March 20, 1941) was an American ornithologist who was one of the co-founders of the American Ornithologists' Union.

== Biography ==
Nathan Clifford Brown was born in Portland, Maine on October 13, 1856. He was named after his maternal grandfather, Associate Supreme Court Justice Nathan Clifford, who had also been a U.S. Representative for Maine, an ambassador to Mexico and an attorney general for Democratic President James K. Polk.

Brown developed an interest in natural history early in his life. He collected birds and attempted taxidermy several times before entering Bowdoin College in 1873. However, poor health interrupted his studies, and it made it difficult for him to find employment. In 1874, Brown sought Charles Johnson Maynard to study taxidermy, which jump-started his ornithological career. Brown finished his apprenticeship in 1875, and moved back to Portland.

Back in Portland, Brown began his work on his "Catalogue of Birds of Portland and Vicinity". Starting in 1878, Brown went on collecting trips in the South, specifically Alabama and Texas. Starting in 1903, he would also visit South Carolina. In 1881, he was named curator of ornithology for the Portland Society of Natural History, a position he held until 1889.

In all, Brown wrote 104 ornithological titles, mostly published in the Bulletin of the Nuttall Ornithological Club and in its successor, The Auk. Starting in 1876, he was a corresponding member of the Nuttall Ornithological Club, and in 1883, he was a founding member of the American Ornithologists' Union.
