= Wood pewee =

Wood pewee or peewee may refer to the following species formerly considered to be a single species:

- Eastern wood pewee, Contopus virens
- Western wood pewee, Contopus sordidulus
