= American Ornithological Society =

Society of professional ornithologists

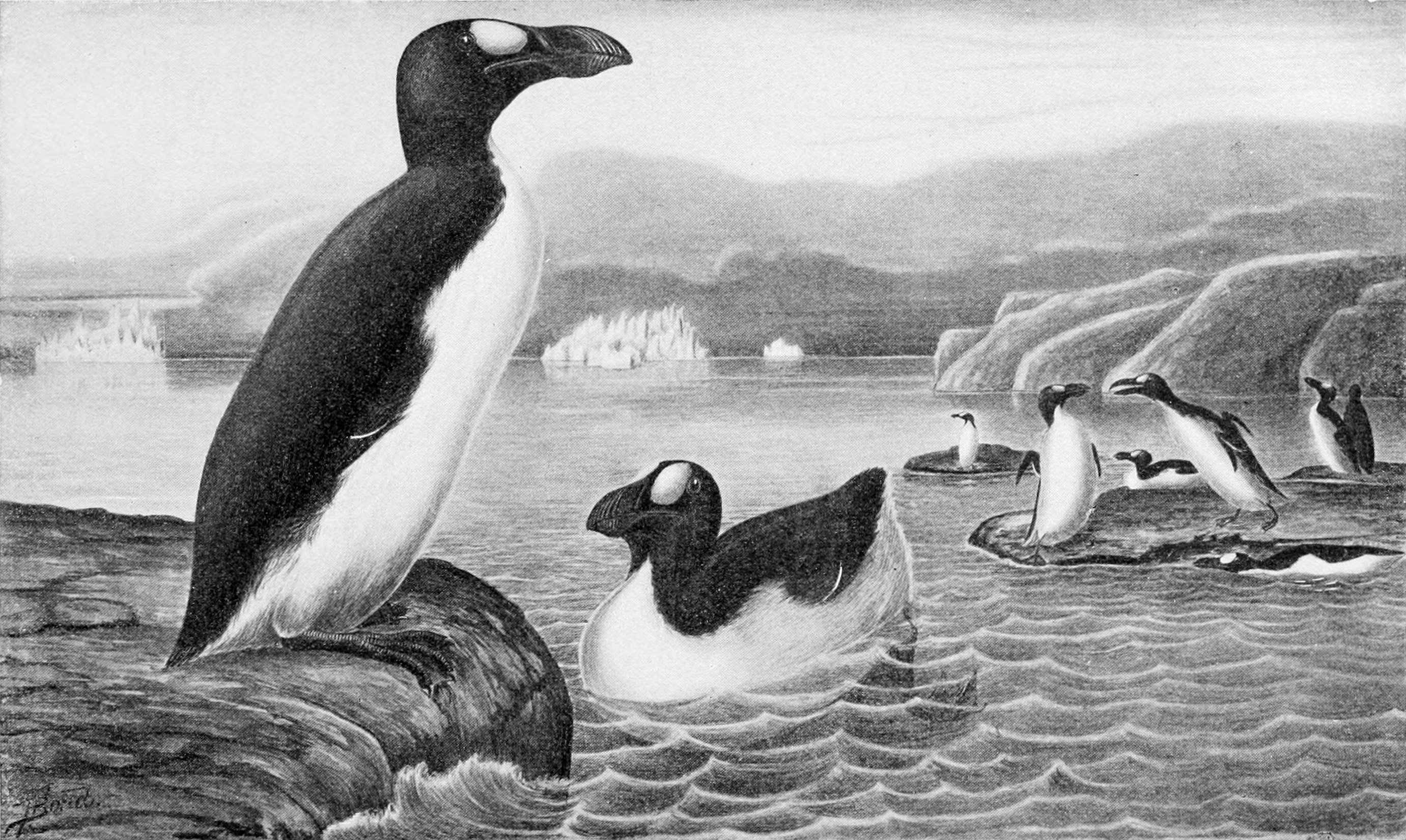
- Symbol of American Ornithologists' Union, the extinct great auk
- Abbreviation: AOS
- Predecessor: American Ornithologists' Union; Cooper Ornithological Society
- Formation: September 26, 1883; 143 years ago
- Type: NGO
- Legal status: 501(c)(3)
- Purpose: Ornithology; Conservation; Education
- Headquarters: Chicago, Illinois
- Location: 1400 S. Lake Shore Dr.
- Coordinates: 41.866269°N 87.616997°W
- Region served: Western Hemisphere
- Members: 3,000
- President: Sara Morris; Canisius College
- President-elect: Morgan Tingley; University of California, Los Angeles
- Secretary: Sushma Reddy; University of Minnesota
- Treasurer: Matthew Carling; University of Wyoming
- Main organ: Council
- Affiliations: Ornithological Council; Ornithological Societies of NA
- Website: americanornithology.org

The American Ornithological Society (AOS) is an ornithological organization based in the United States. The society was formed in October 2016 by the merger of the American Ornithologists' Union (AOU) and the Cooper Ornithological Society. Its members are primarily professional ornithologists, although membership is open to anyone with an interest in birds. The society publishes the two scholarly journals, Ornithology (formerly The Auk) and Ornithological Applications (formerly The Condor) as well as the AOS Checklist of North American Birds. The American Ornithological Society claims the authority to establish standardized English bird names throughout North and South Americas.

In 2013, the American Ornithologists' Union (AOU) announced a collaboration with the Cooper Ornithological Society, streamlining operations through joint meetings, a shared publishing office, and a reorientation of their journals. By October 2016, the AOU ceased its independent status, merging with the Cooper Ornithological Society to establish the unified American Ornithological Society.

== History ==
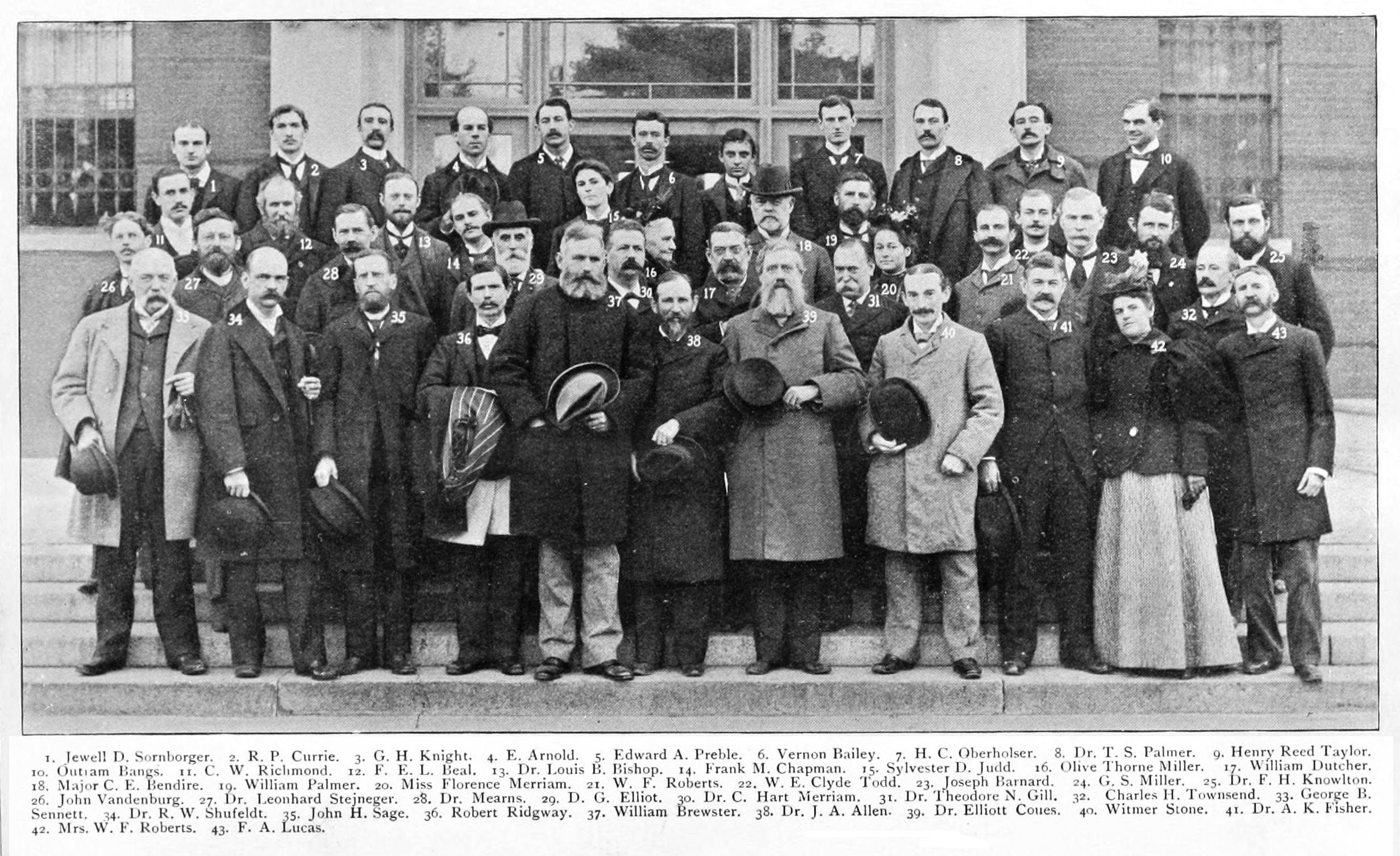
Participants of the 13th Congress of the AOU

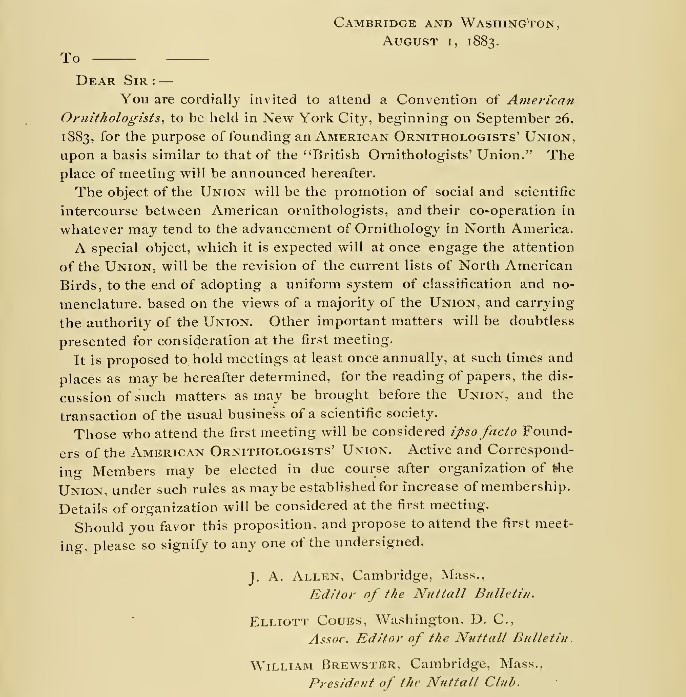
Original letter to AOU founders, dated August 1, 1883

The American Ornithologists' Union was founded in 1883. Three members of the Nuttall Ornithological Club, Elliott Coues, J. A. Allen, and William Brewster, sent letters to 48 prominent ornithologists inviting them "to attend a Convention of American Ornithologists, to be held in New York City, beginning on September 26, 1883, for the purpose of founding an American Ornithologists' Union, upon a basis similar to that of the "British Ornithologists' Union." The addressees were selected mainly because of their "scientific standing, but somewhat with regard to geographical representation, it being desirable to make the gathering as catholic and non-sectional as possible." Twenty-five responded to the letter and 21 were present at the first meeting. The founding convention was held in the library of the American Museum of Natural History on September 26, 1883. Founding members of the AOU include those present at the inaugural convention, listed below. In addition, the members of the new Union unanimously enrolled two others as founding members: Professor S. Baird, who was unable to attend due to his duties at the Smithsonian, and J. A. Allen, who could not attend due to physical disability.

- From Iowa: Charles Aldrich.
- From New York: Harry Balch Bailey, Eugene Pintard Bicknell, Daniel Giraud Elliot, Albert Kenrick Fisher, Joseph Bassett Holder, Edgar Alexander Mearns, and Clinton Hart Merriam.
- From Massachusetts: Charles Foster Batchelder, William Brewster, Charles Barney Cory, and Henry Augustus Purdie.
- From Oregon: Charles Bendire.
- From Maine: Nathan Clifford Brown.
- From New Brunswick: Montague Chamberlain.
- From the District of Columbia: Elliott Coues, D. Webster Prentiss, and Robert Ridgway.
- From Louisiana: Robert Wilson Shufeldt.
- From Canada: Thomas McIlwraith.
- From Ohio: John Maynard Wheaton.

In 2013, the American Ornithologists' Union announced a close partnership with the Cooper Ornithological Society, including joint meetings, a centralized publishing office, and a refocusing of their respective journals to increase efficiency of research. In October 2016, the AOU announced that it was ceasing to operate as an independent union and was merging with the Cooper Ornithological Society to create the American Ornithological Society.

In October 2023, the AOS announced that it was set to rename all bird species associated with individuals, aiming to eliminate names linked to figures with problematic or racist pasts. Additionally, three non-eponymous species with names deemed exclusionary or offensive: Flesh-footed Shearwater, Eskimo Curlew, and Inca Dove. Aiming for more descriptive names based on habitat or physical features, the renaming process would involve public input. Over 100 avian species across the Americas would undergo this change, with the move eliciting mixed reactions within the birding community.

== Leadership ==
Past Presidents of the AOU
- Joel Asaph Allen, 1883–1890
- Daniel Giraud Elliot, 1890–1892
- Elliott Coues, 1892–1895
- William Brewster, 1895–1898
- Robert Ridgway, 1898–1900
- Clinton Hart Merriam, 1900–1903
- Charles Barney Cory, 1903–1905
- Charles Foster Batchelder, 1905–1908
- Edward William Nelson, 1908–1911
- Frank Michler Chapman, 1911–1914
- Albert Kenrick Fisher, 1914–1917
- John Hall Sage, 1917–1920
- Witmer Stone, 1920–1923
- Jonathan Dwight, 1923–1926
- Alexander Wetmore, 1926–1929
- Joseph Grinnell, 1929–1932
- James Henry Fleming, 1932–1935
- Arthur Cleveland Bent, 1935–1937
- Herbert Friedmann, 1937–1939
- James Paul Chapin, 1939–1942
- James Lee Peters, 1942–1945
- Hoyes Lloyd, 1945–1948
- Robert Cushman Murphy, 1948–1950
- Josselyn Van Tyne, 1950–1953
- Alden Holmes Miller, 1953–1956
- Ludlow Griscom, 1956
- Ernst Mayr, 1957–1959
- George Hines Lowery, 1959–1962
- Austin Loomer Rand, 1962–1964
- Dean Amadon, 1964–1966
- Harold Ford Mayfield, 1966–1968
- John W. Aldrich, 1968–1970
- Robert W. Storer, 1970–1972
- Joseph Hickey, 1972–1973
- Donald Sankey Farner, 1973–1975
- John T. Emlen, 1975–1976
- Wesley E. Lanyon 1976–1978
- Harrison B. Tordoff, 1978–1980
- James Roger King, 1980–1982
- Thomas R. Howell, 1982–1984
- Frances C. James, 1984–1986
- Charles Sibley, 1986–1988
- Glen E. Woolfenden, 1988–1990
- Burt L. Monroe, jr., 1990–1992
- Brina Kessel, 1992–1994
- Richard C. Banks, 1994–1996
- Ned K. Johnson, 1996-1998
- Frank Gill, 1998–2000
- John W. Fitzpatrick, 2000–2002
- Fred Cooke, 2002–2004
- James A. Kushlan, 2004–2006
- Erica H. Dunn, 2006–2008
- Edward H. Burtt, Jr., 2008–2010
- John R. Faaborg, 2010-2012
- Susan M. Haig, 2012-2014
- Scott M. Lanyon, 2014–2016

== Membership ==
Regular membership in the AOS is open to any dues paying person with an interest in birds. Student rates are available for full-time students. Student Membership Awards of a no-cost membership are available to qualified undergraduate and graduate students who wish to pursue a career in ornithology. There are three higher classes of membership, Elective Member, Honorary Fellow and Fellow.

Elective Members are selected "for significant contributions to ornithology and/or service to the Union." When elected, they must reside in the Western Hemisphere. A proposed Elective Member must be nominated by three Fellows or Elective Members and more than half of the Fellows and Elective Members must vote for the proposed member to be declared elected.

Honorary Fellows are limited to 100 and are "chosen for exceptional ornithological eminence and must at the time of their election be residents of a country other than the United States of America or Canada." Nominations for Honorary Fellow are by a special committee appointed by the president or any three Fellows. A vote of the majority of the Fellows present at an annual meeting is required for election. Each Fellow may vote affirmatively for as many as there are vacancies.

Fellows are chosen "for exceptional and sustained contributions to ornithology and/or service to the Union" and must be residents or citizens of the Western Hemisphere when elected. Candidates must be an Honorary Fellow or Elective Member in good standing. A vote of two thirds of the Fellows at an annual meeting is required for election as a Fellow.

== Publications ==
The quarterly journal, Ornithology (formerly The Auk), has been published since January 1884. The quarterly journal, Ornithological Applications (formerly The Condor), has been published since 1899. Other significant publications include the AOS Checklist of North American Birds, which is the standard reference work for the field, and a monograph series, Ornithological Monographs.

== Awards ==
The AOS presents annual awards to recognize achievements and service, support research, and encourage student participation.

=== Scientific awards ===
The AOS recognizes members' outstanding contributions to ornithological science through four senior professional awards and three early professional awards:

- The William Brewster Memorial Award "is given annually to the author or co-authors (not previously so honored) of an exceptional body of work on birds of the Western Hemisphere" and consists of a medal and honorarium. The first Brewster Medal was awarded in 1921.
- The Elliott Coues Award has been presented annually since 1972 to recognize outstanding and innovative contributions to ornithological research without limitation as to geographic area, sub-discipline(s) of ornithology, or when the work was done. It consists of a medal and an honorarium.
- The Loye and Alden Miller Research Award, awarded annually since 1993, recognizes lifetime achievement in ornithological research.
- The Ralph W. Schreiber Conservation Award honors extraordinary scientific contributions to the conservation, restoration, or preservation of birds and/or their habitats by an individual or team. The award has been presented since 2005 and consists of a certificate and honorarium.
- Two James G. Cooper Young Professional Awards and one Ned K. Johnson Young Investigator Award are presented annually to recognize outstanding and promising work by researchers early in their careers in any field of ornithology. Each award includes an honorarium, an invitation to give a plenary at the annual meeting, gratis registration, and a travel stipend to the annual meeting up to $1000.

=== Student awards ===
A decline in student membership in the AOU and other ornithological societies prompted creation of a Student Affairs Committee in 2003. Several awards for students were created starting in 2005 as well as activities for students at annual meetings.

- The Student Membership Award provides one year of full AOS membership benefits for qualified undergraduate or graduate students interested in pursuing a career in ornithology. Students must apply each year during the fall semester from September through December with a resume or curriculum vitae describing their degree program, the expected completion date, their academic or work experience, and interests in ornithology. A note of support from the student's academic advisor is also required. Membership in the AOS is required to compete for travel, research and presentation awards.
- The AOS Student and Postdoctoral Travel Awards are competitive awards that defray travel expenses to annual meetings of the society for student members. Application procedures are distributed to eligible members each year.
- A student can compete for one of several AOS Student Presentation Awards when presenting a poster or oral paper at an annual meeting. The Robert B. Berry Student Award is given for the best oral presentation on a topic pertaining to avian conservation. The Mark E. Hauber Award is given for the best oral presentation on avian behavior. Four additional awards are given for the best presentation on any topic in ornithology. Applications are distributed to eligible AOS members.

== Committees ==
Much of the AOS's work is accomplished by its thirty-three standing committees. Many of these are common for any organization such as Bylaws, History and Membership. Other committees are of special importance to ornithology.

- The Committee on Bird Collections is charged with monitoring the status of avian material collections, maintaining liaison with organizations holding collections and conducting and publishing inventories of collections. Its work on permits for the possession and transport of specimens is especially important to museums and researchers.
- The Committee on Classification and Nomenclature – South America, better known as the South American Classification Committee (SACC) deals with creating a standard classification, with English names, for the bird species of South America.
- The North American Classification Committee (NACC) is responsible for the AOS Checklist of North and Middle American Birds.

== See also ==
- List of ornithology awards
- List of ornithology journals
