= AOS Checklist of North American Birds =

The first edition of the AOU Checklist of North American Birds

The AOS Checklist of North American Birds is a checklist of the bird species found in North and Middle America which is now maintained by the American Ornithological Society (AOS). The checklist was originally published by the AOS's predecessor, the American Ornithologists' Union (AOU). The Union merged with the Cooper Ornithological Society in 2016 to form the American Ornithological Society. The checklist was first published in 1886; the seventh edition of the checklist was published in 1998 and is now updated every year by an open-access article published in the Ibis. Seven editions and 54 supplements (minor updates) have been published in the last 127 years. According to Joel Asaph Allen, the Codes of Nomenclature set out in the first edition of the Checklist "later became the basis of the International Code of Zoological Nomenclature, framed on essentially the same lines and departing from it in no essential respect, except in point of brevity, through omission of adequate illustrations of the rules, and thereby rendering necessary the issuance of official 'Opinions' to clear up obscure points."

The current version of the checklist is available online from the website of the American Ornithological Society. The list is updated regularly by the AOS's North American Classification Committee (NACC), which considers proposals related to classification and nomenclature.
