= Birding in New York City =

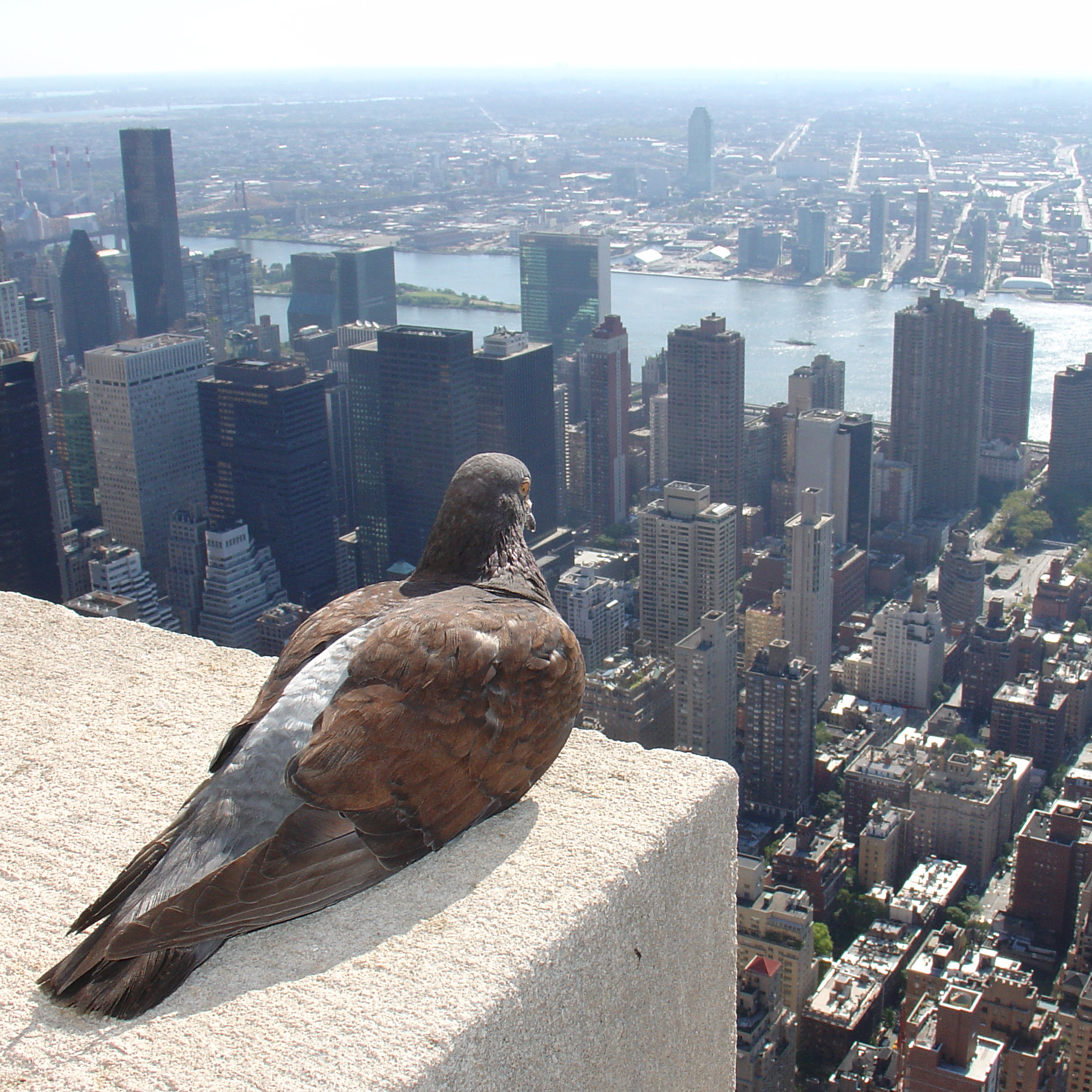
Feral pigeon (Columba livia domestica) atop the Empire State Building in Manhattan

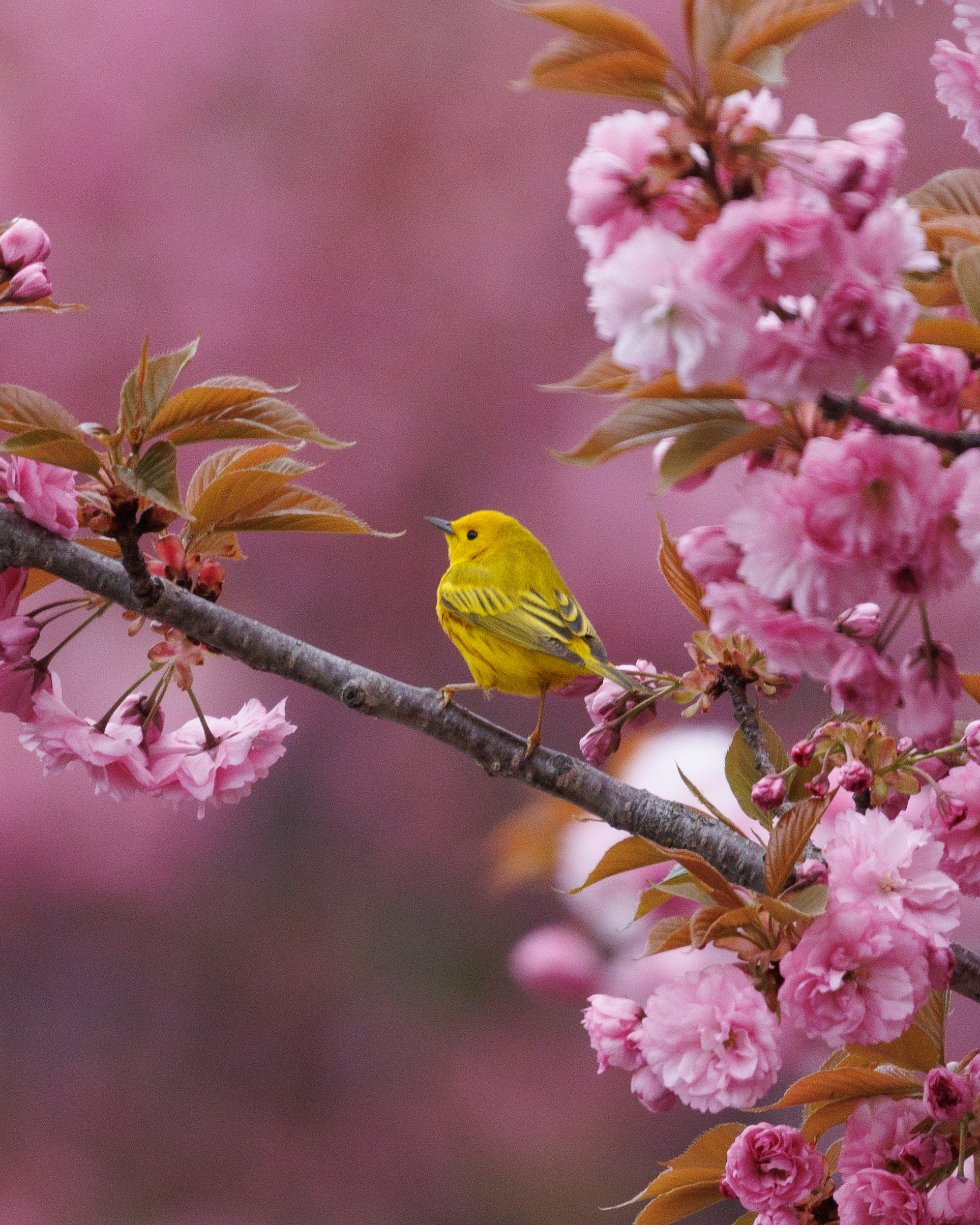
Yellow warbler (Setophaga aestiva) in Brooklyn's Green-Wood Cemetery

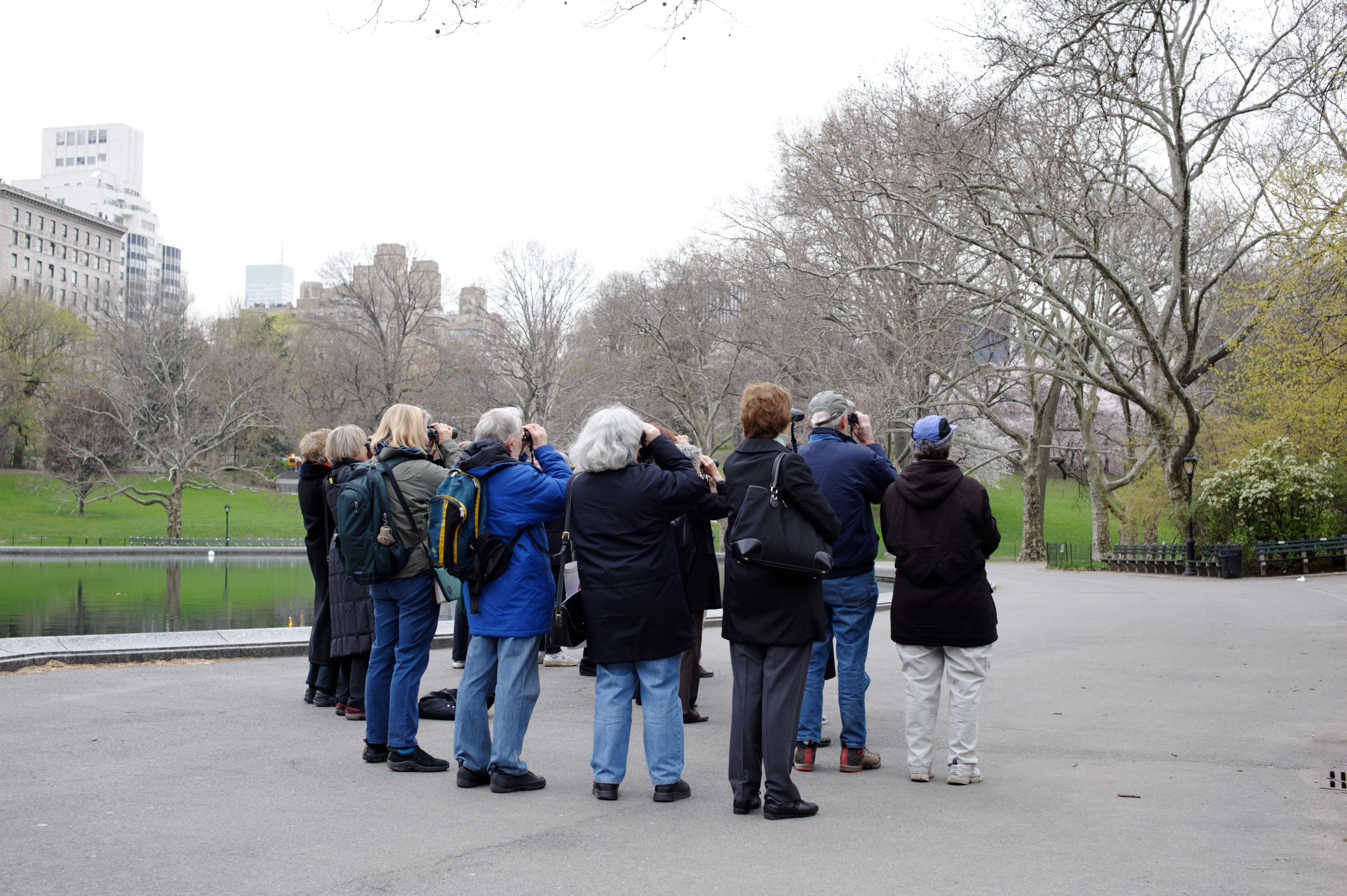
Bird watchers in Central Park (2009)

New York City is home to a large birding community and diverse range of bird species. Though it is the most populous and most densely populated city in the United States, NYC is home to a range of ecological habitats and is situated along the Atlantic Flyway, a major route for migrating birds. More than 400 species have been recorded in the city, and their concentration in the city's urban parklands, forests, marshes, and beaches has made birding a popular activity in the city, especially after the start of the COVID-19 pandemic.

New York City has 30,000 acres of parkland and 578 miles of coastline.

== Background ==
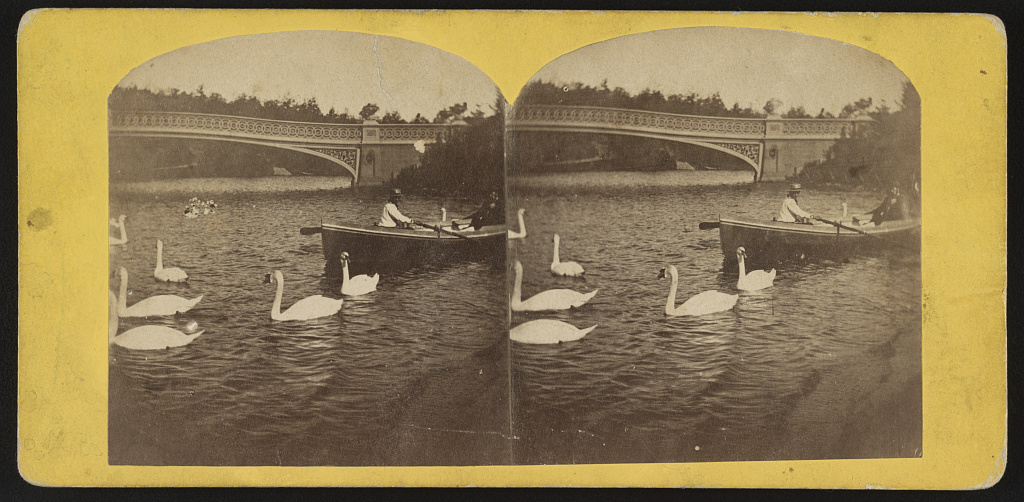
Stereographic view c. 1865: Bow Bridge, a boater and introduced mute swans (Cygnus olor) on the lake in Central Park

New York City is the most populous and most densely populated city in the United States, with 8,804,190 people as of the 2020 census. There is little data available about birding demographics in New York City in particular, although New York state was the second most active state for birding according to the 2021 National Survey of Birdwatchers.

During the COVID-19 pandemic, interest in birding surged, alongside other outdoor activities. New York City was the epicenter of the pandemic in the United States in March and April 2020, and with most businesses and schools closed, people looked for activities they could do while outdoors and socially distanced. Birding provided a pastime which could be done alone or with a group, and which could act as a distraction or otherwise relieve the stress of the ongoing pandemic.

== Species ==
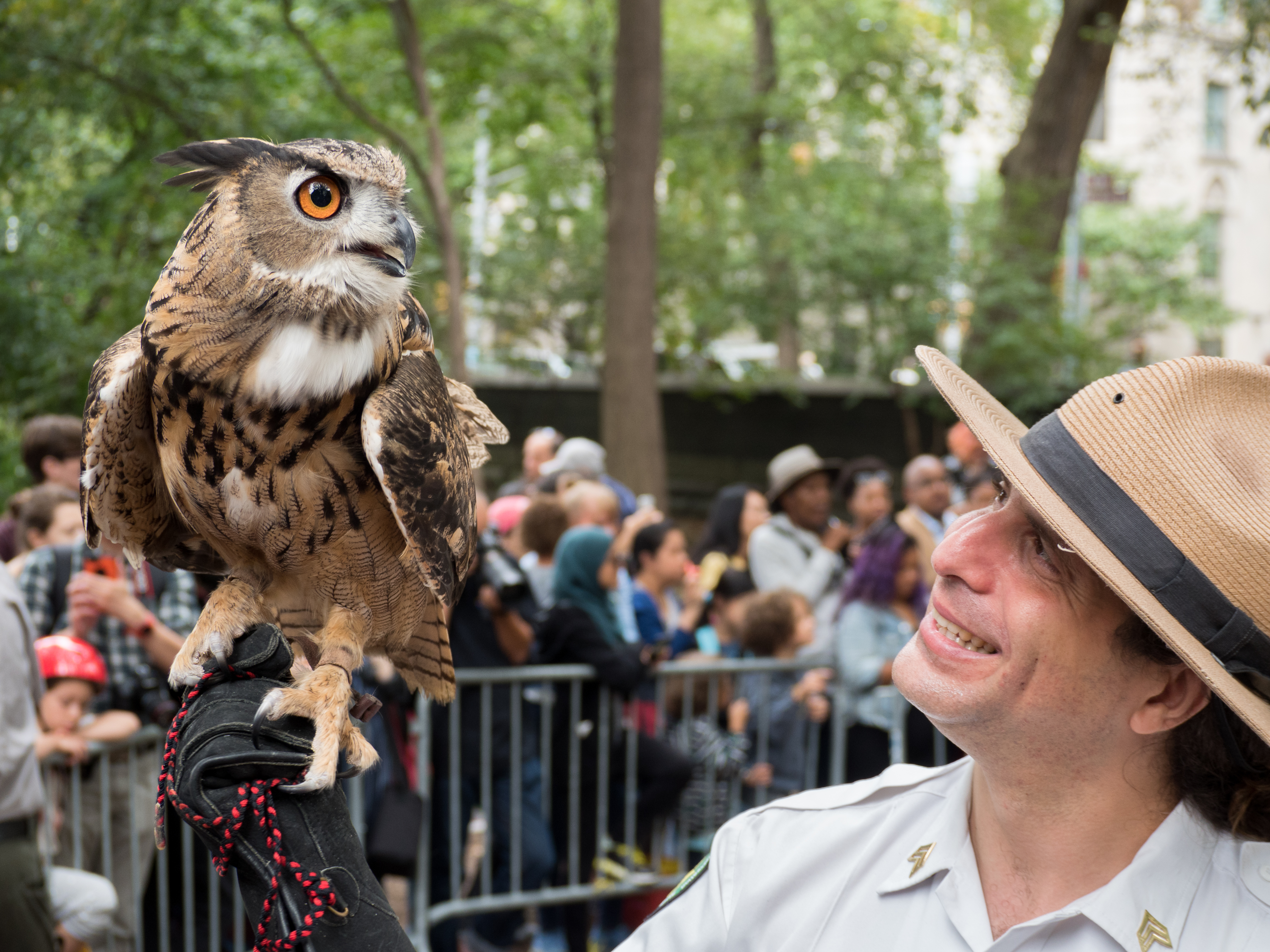
An Urban Park Ranger with a Eurasian eagle-owl at a NYC Parks public bird event called Raptor Fest

While New York City is commonly associated with pigeons and other common urban birds like house sparrows and European starlings, hundreds of bird species reside in or travel through the city each year. It is situated along the Atlantic Flyway, a major route for migrating birds in the spring and fall. Migration takes place in the spring and fall, with additional shorebirds and raptors, which took different routes north in the spring, coming through in the fall. The city's particular geographic location along the route, combined with a range of different habitats across the five boroughs, leads to a large number of species residing in, traveling through, or spending a season in the city each year. Journalists, scientists, and other writers frequently comment about the apparent contradiction between the size and density of New York City with its unusual variety of bird species and status as a birding destination.

Ludlow Griscom's 1923 handbook, Birds of the New York City Region, counts 377 species and subspecies divided into categories of "residents" (37 year-round and 89 in the summer), "visitants" (6 in the summer, 30 in the winter, 20 irregularly in the winter, 18 "casual", and 66 "accidental"), "transients" (78 regular and 21 irregular), and 12 "extinct or extirpated species". The NYC Bird Alliance reports more than 400 documented species in the city, with between 200 and 300 on any given year. The quantity of pigeons, rats, and mallards attract raptors like hawks and a smaller number of owls. Between 1998 and 2002, a Parks Department initiative reintroduced eastern screech owls to Central Park after none had been seen since 1955.

New York state produces a Breeding Bird Atlas, tracking behaviors of birds in the state. The process takes place every twenty years, and spans five years of data. The first atlas was undertaken in 1980–85, with another from 2000 to 2005, and a third which began in 2020 and is in progress as of 2022. Unlike typical birding, which largely involves spotting, identifying, and counting bird species, "atlasing" requires watching for and documenting a wide range of behaviors, habitats, and even nests without birds.

== Locations ==
New York City's five boroughs (the Bronx, Brooklyn, Manhattan, Queens, and Staten Island) are home to a range of habitats, but most greenspace or natural space is in the city's parks. Given New York City's location on the Atlantic Flyway, spring and fall migration are the most popular times for birding. The major city parks are known as "migrant traps" or "migrant magnets", providing the right combination of food, geography, trees and plants, and weather to attract large numbers of migrants in a relatively small area. During migration, when a large number of birds pass over the city, they have limited options for places to land, rest, forage, or breed. Parks like Central Park, otherwise surrounded by buildings and roads, thus attract a large and diverse quantity of birds. Birding is most popular in the early morning, when the birds are active and there are fewer people in the park.

Most of the major birding hotspots in the city are accessible by public transportation. Many of the best known coastal birding locations in Brooklyn and Queens, and on the east coast of Staten Island, are part of the Gateway National Recreation Area, a US National Recreation Area created by Congress in 1972, owned by the federal government and managed by the National Park Service. The New York City Parks Department increased conservation and public education programs starting in the 1970s with the founding of Urban Park Rangers, and then the National Resources Group (NRG) in 1984. The NRG develops and implements plans to acquire, protect, and restore natural areas within the city while the park rangers guide members of the public to those areas.

Two locations in New York City, Central Park in Manhattan, and the Jamaica Bay Wildlife Refuge in Queens, are listed in Fifty Places to Go Birding Before You Die: Birding Experts Share the World's Greatest Destinations. The New York State Department of Environmental Conservation established the New York State Birding Trail in 2021–22, with many locations listed in New York City. The New York City Parks Department also maintains more than fifty "Forever Wild" parks, in part to preserve natural areas for birds and other wildlife.

=== Bronx ===
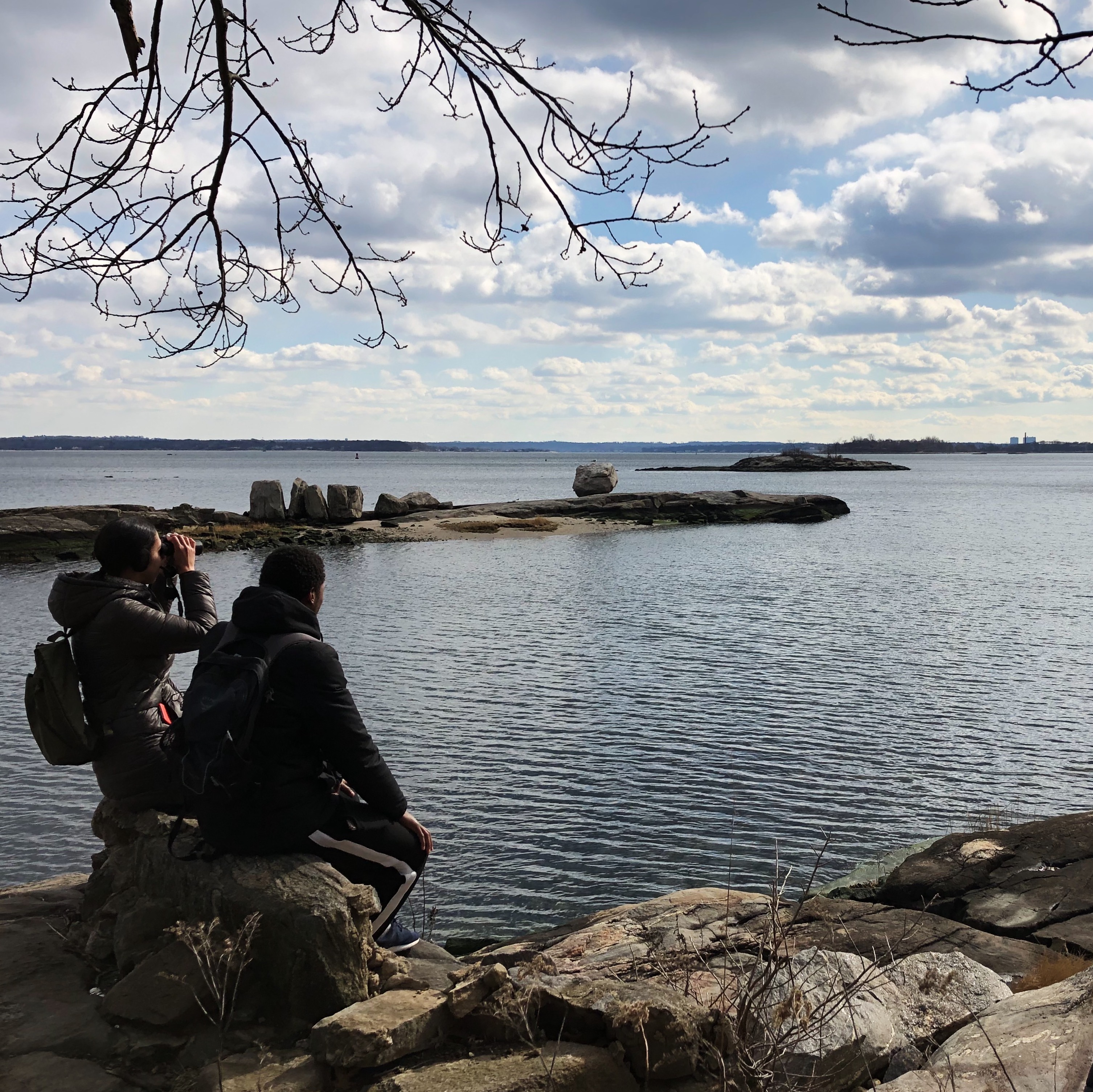
Two people birding in Pelham Bay Park in the Bronx

Bronx Park, now predominantly occupied by the New York Botanical Garden and the Bronx Zoo, was a prominent birding location at the turn of the 20th century, when the area was still largely rural. According to George E. Hix, a Lawrence warbler sighting drew attention to the site in 1903. Other popular birding locations include Crotona Park, Roberto Clemente State Park, Van Cortlandt Lake, and Pelham Bay South, which are on the New York State Birding Trail.

=== Brooklyn ===
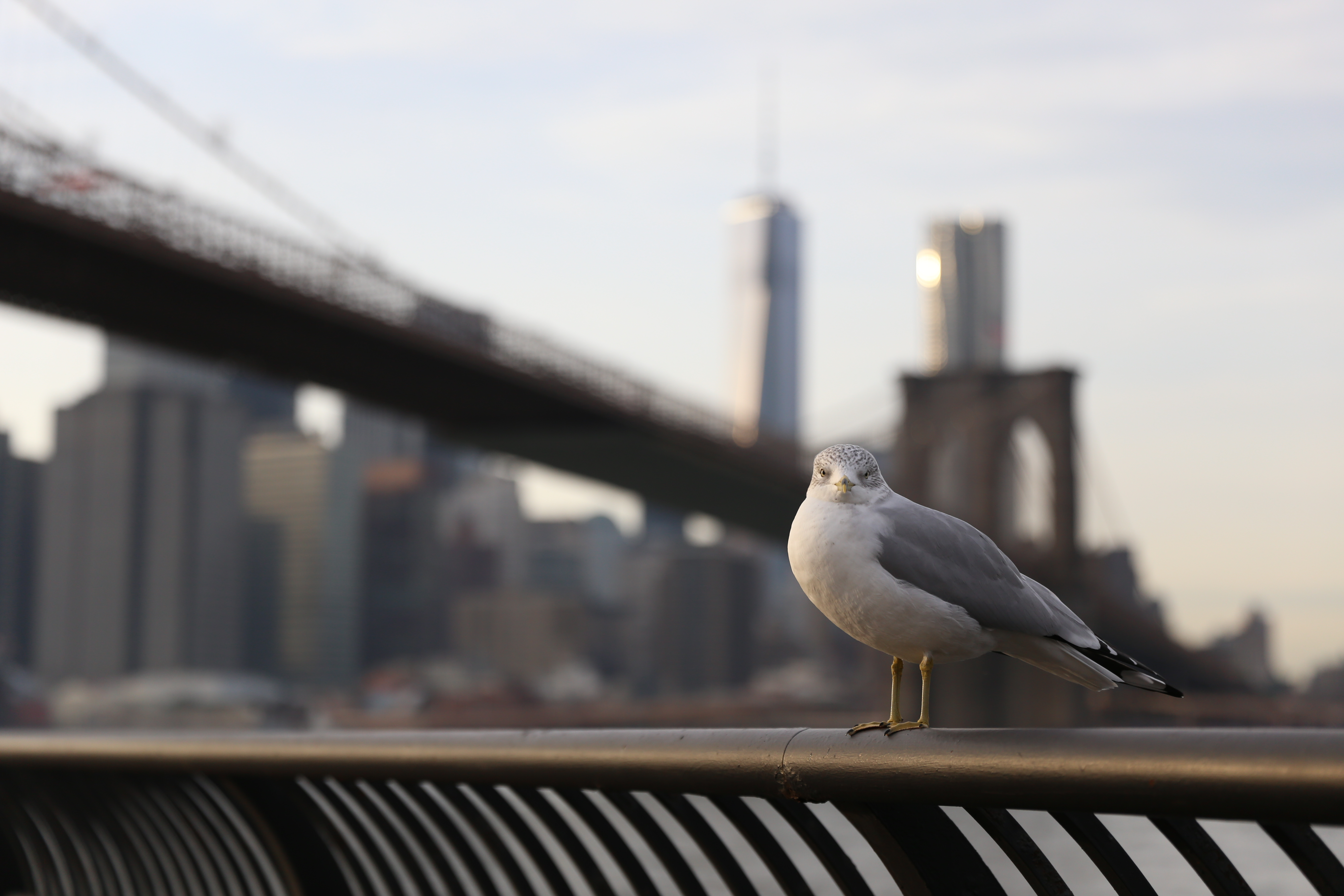
Ring-billed gull at Brooklyn Bridge Park

Prospect Park is considered the flagship New York City Park in Brooklyn, and the most active birding location. The NYC Bird Alliance operates an educational center in the park's boathouse. The Brooklyn Botanic Garden, just northeast of Prospect Park, has long organized bird-related events.

The coasts to the south and southwest of Brooklyn have several beaches and salt marshes where a variety of shorebirds and marsh birds are common. Seaside sparrows and Nelson's sparrows are commonly seen around Coney Island and Plumb Beach, for example. Several of these areas, such as Floyd Bennett Field, Plumb Beach, and Shirley Chisholm State Park, are part of the Jamaica Bay unit of the Gateway National Recreation Area. The New York Birding Trail includes nine locations in Brooklyn: Calvert Vaux Park, Plumb Beach, Floyd Bennett Field, Marine Park Salt Marsh, Shirley Chisholm State Park, Prospect Park, Fort Greene Park, Highland Park Ridgewood Reservoir, and Marsha P. Johnson State Park. Parts of the former industrial waterfront areas of Brooklyn have been converted into public space, included some which attract a range of waterfowl and other aquatic birds. Bush Terminal Pier Park, which opened in 2014, is a common birding spot for the ducks, gulls, raptors, and other species it attracts.

Monk parakeets nesting in the Green-Wood Cemetery gate

Floyd Bennett Field is a former airport which was added to the Gateway National Recreation Area in 1972. At the time it was not accessible to the general public, and became known for grassland birds like eastern meadowlarks, grasshopper sparrows, and upland sandpipers in the summer, and raptors like northern harriers and short-eared owls in the winter. It has since become a mixed use recreation area for the public and lost much of its grassland area. These changes, plus a broader trends in bird populations led these grassland birds and owls to become uncommon. At the same time, a few species were seen breeding there in the 2000-2004 Breeding Bird Atlas which had not been seen in the 1980-1984 edition: willets, Carolina wrens, brown-headed cowbirds, and savannah sparrows. It is a common nesting site for American kestrels, and regarded as among the best places in the area to see them. It is also the site of a variety of public projects, such as relief operations during Hurricane Sandy and construction of a pipeline, which have led to some additional development of former wildlife habitats. At the end of 2014, a Cassin's kingbird attracted birders from outside New York to the site.

Monk parakeets, which are not native to the United States, have set up multiple colonies in Brooklyn, but their origin is disputed. A common story involves the parakeets, considered a nuisance in Argentina, shipped up to New York for the pet trade in the 1950s. After arriving, they reportedly escaped. Alternatively, the colonies may have started by various escaped pets. There are populations in Gravesend, Marine Park, and in Midwood by the Brooklyn College athletic field, but the largest and best known colony is in the landmarked Gothic arch at the entrance to Green-Wood Cemetery, where they have been permitted to reside indefinitely. The cemetery, with diverse plantings in its landscaped space, is also a popular birding destination, especially around its four small bodies of water.

=== Manhattan ===
Central Park is the most popular birding location in New York. During spring and fall migration, it is particularly known for a variety of warbler species. The New York Times called it a "birding mecca", along with the Everglades and Yosemite National Park. The American Bird Conservancy and National Audubon Society consider it an "Important Bird Area". The part of the park known as the Ramble, in particular, attracts a large number of migrants. 272 bird species have been seen in the park, though a much smaller number actually breed there. Breeding species include American robins and about sixteen others. A few species nest among the tall buildings. In addition to common building nesters like house sparrows, feral pigeons, and European starlings, raptors like American kestrels and red-tailed hawks have built nests on top of large buildings or in cavities. Herring gulls nest on buildings by the coast, like the Farley Building and Javits Center.

In the early 90s, the New York City Parks Department's Urban Park Rangers program ran educational programs in the park, including bird walks and species reintroductions, although the practice lessened in the early 2000s. A former parks department bird walk leader, Robert "Birding Bob" DeCandido began leading walks independently. Another birder, Starr Saphir, also become well known for leading bird walks in Central Park for nearly 40 years.

There have been disagreements between birders and park officials when the latter have removed trees or made other changes to preserve an overall aesthetic or design of the park as a whole at the expense of trees which are attractive to wildlife.

Manhattan has four locations on the New York State Birding Trail: Governors Island, Central Park, Fort Tryon Park, and Inwood Hill Park.

=== Queens ===
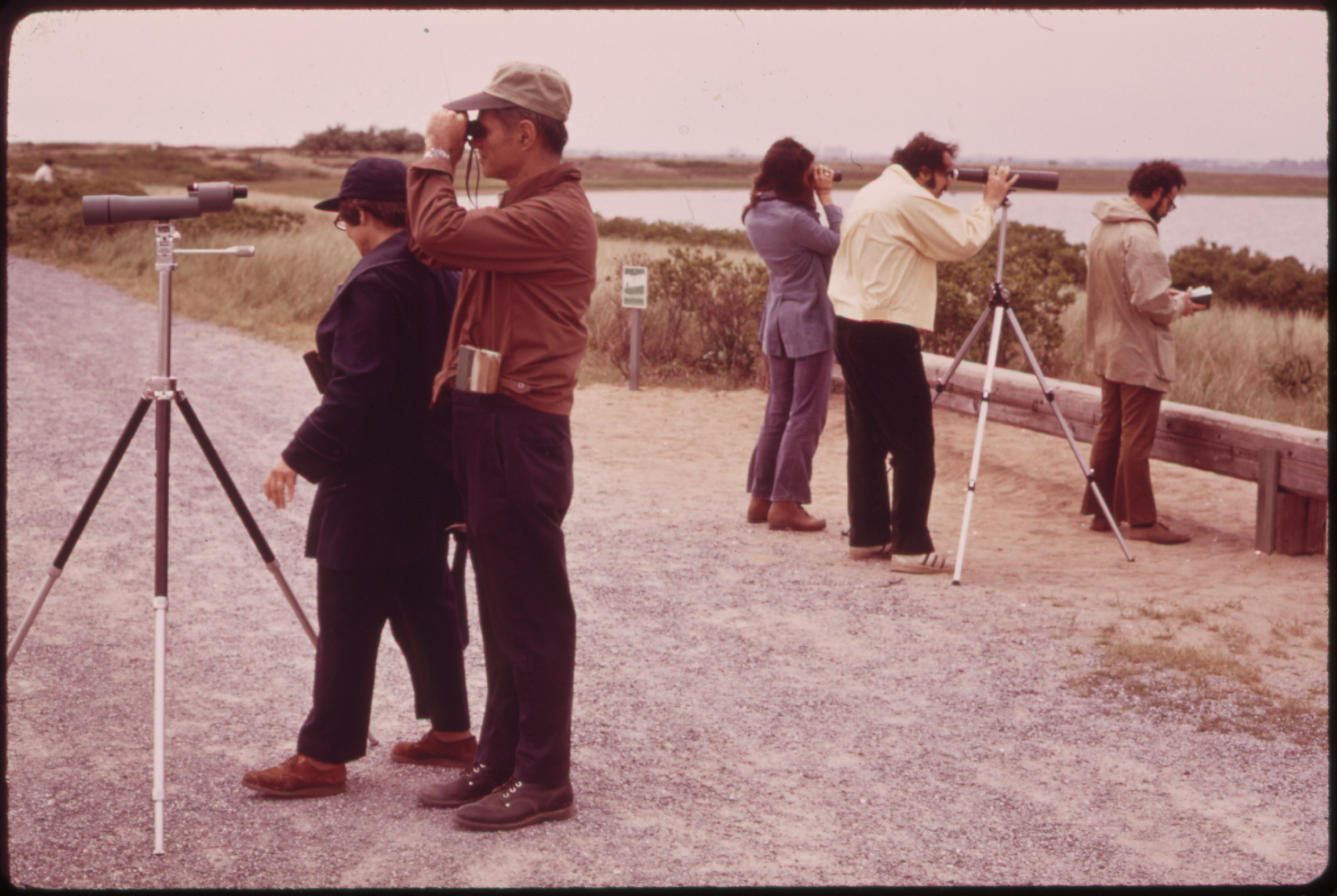
Birders in the Jamaica Bay Wildlife Refuge in 1973

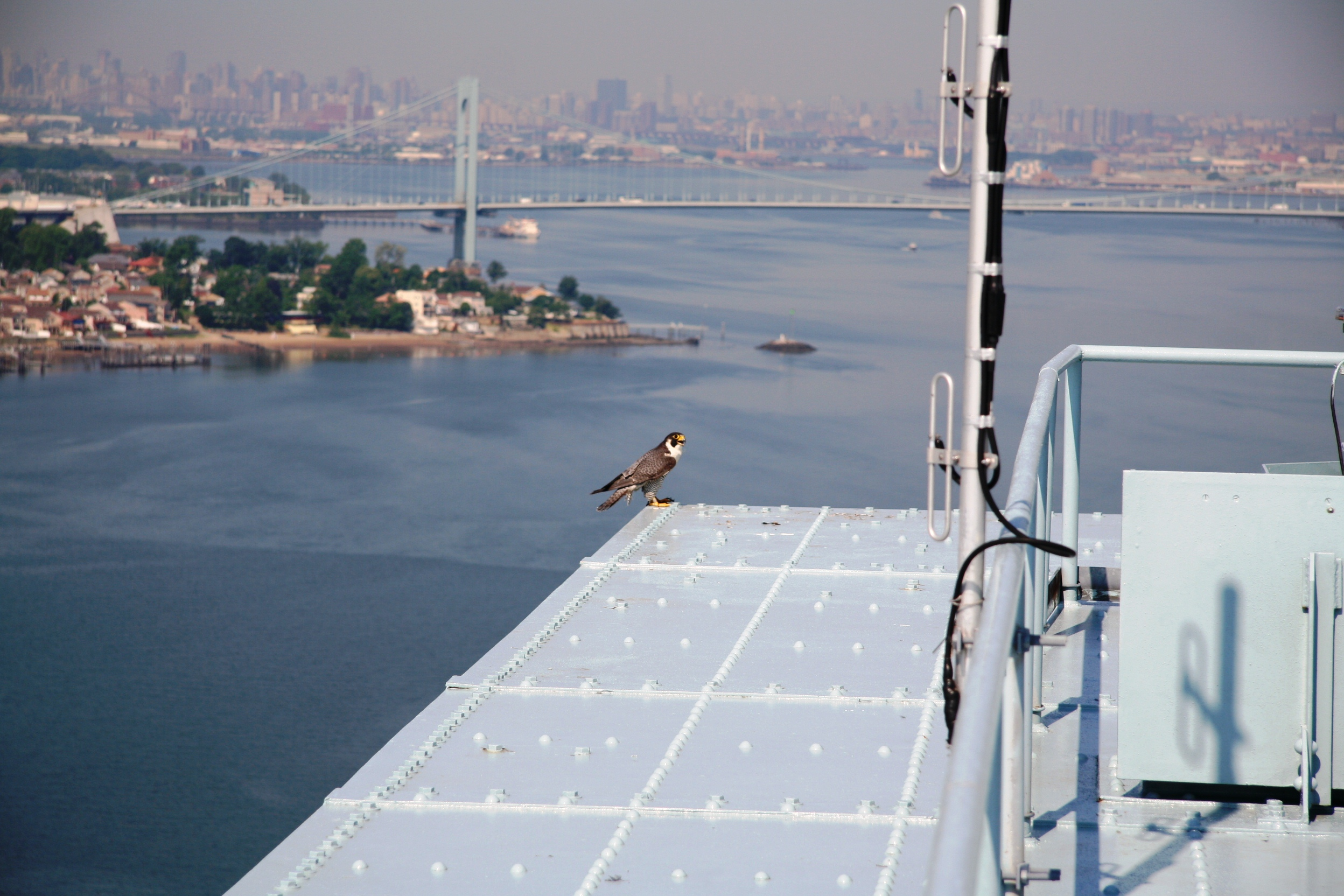
Peregrine falcon (Falco peregrinus) perches on Throgs Neck Bridge between the Bronx and Queens

Most of the Jamaica Bay Wildlife Refuge, including the parts accessible to the public, are located in Queens. More species have been seen at the refuge than in any other location in the city, with 322 reported to eBird. The refuge includes several islands in Jamaica Bay, an important fish, wildlife, and plant habitat complex. The shape of the bay concentrates migrating species between its coastlines and through its open space between more heavily developed urban areas. The refuge was established by the NYC Parks Department in 1953, and included the creation of two ponds on either side of Cross Bay Boulevard. The West Pond is surrounded by paths and woodlands while the East Pond, with a water level manually controlled to create ideal conditions for shorebirds, is less developed. The refuge was transferred to the National Park Service in 1972, becoming its only "wildlife refuge" (which are typically the domain of the Fish and Wildlife Service). It is part of the Jamaica Bay Unit of the Gateway National Recreation Area, alongside other Queens birding destinations like Breezy Point Tip, Jacob Riis Park, and Fort Tilden. The islands' salt marshes attract a wide range of birds and other wildlife. Ospreys, which were at one time endangered due to the pesticide DDT, have regularly nested in the refuge since 1991. Glossy ibis and snowy egrets breed there.

Beaches on the Rockaways, including Fort Tilden, Rockaway Beach, and Breezy Point, are nesting sites for several shorebirds like piping plovers, American oystercatchers, and least terns. Areas of public beaches are fenced off during the breeding season.

Alley Pond Park, Kissena Park, and Forest Park are also popular birding places. The Queens County Bird Club maintains bird feeders in Forest Park.

Fort Tilden, Jamaica Bay Wildlife Refuge, Norton Basin Natural Resource Area, Bayswater Point State Park, Kissena Park, Forest Park, and Gantry Plaza State Park are on the New York Birding Trail.

=== Staten Island ===
Staten Island the second highest number of species sighted of the five boroughs, after Queens. Clove Lakes Park is among the most popular birding spots on the island. It includes several bodies of water in its 193 acres, and is known for warblers during spring migration. It is home to the city's only great blue heron nesting pair.

The Staten Island Greenbelt is a 3,000-acre collection of parks including a variety of habitats, including the woods and ponds of High Rock Park. Great Kills Park, Miller Field, and Fort Wadsworth are part of the Gateway National Recreation Area.

Goethals Pond, near Goethals Bridge, is a hotspot for shorebirds, including a large number of unusual vagrant species. The southern tip of Conference House Park, which is also the southernmost point in New York State, has a view of the ocean that provides an opportunity to see seabirds.

In the 1970s, Audubon surveyors discovered nesting herons and egrets on islands off the coast of Staten Island. Eventually, ten species of the family were identified nesting on islands of New York and New Jersey harbor, sparking a conservation project subsequent legislation to protect the colonies.

The Mount Loretto Unique Area was the first established segment of the New York State Birding Trail in 2021, which later expanded to include Clay Pit Ponds State Park Preserve, Crooke's Point, Brookfield Park, High Rock Park, Saint Francis Woodlands, Old Place Creek, Goethals Pond Complex, Clove Lakes Park, and Fort Wadsworth.

== Issues ==
=== Plume trade ===
New York City was a major center in the debate over hunting and trading birds for fashion. In the late 19th century, a time of prosperity led to increased popularity of luxury goods like fashion accessories. Bird feathers and other parts were common features, especially in hats. Birds like the great egret were hunted in large numbers to use their plumes. In 1886, Frank Chapman, an ornithologist with the American Museum of Natural History, conducted a "feathered hat census". He walked around the streets of Manhattan, counting hats that used feathers or other bird parts and trying to identify the bird species when possible. Birds were used in about 75% of women's hats at the time and included at 40 identifiable native species. New York State passed the Audubon Plumage Law in May 1910, prohibited the sale of plumes of native birds.

Gordon Ross' The woman behind the gun (1911) illustrates the environmental impact of feathered hats

=== Invasive species introductions ===
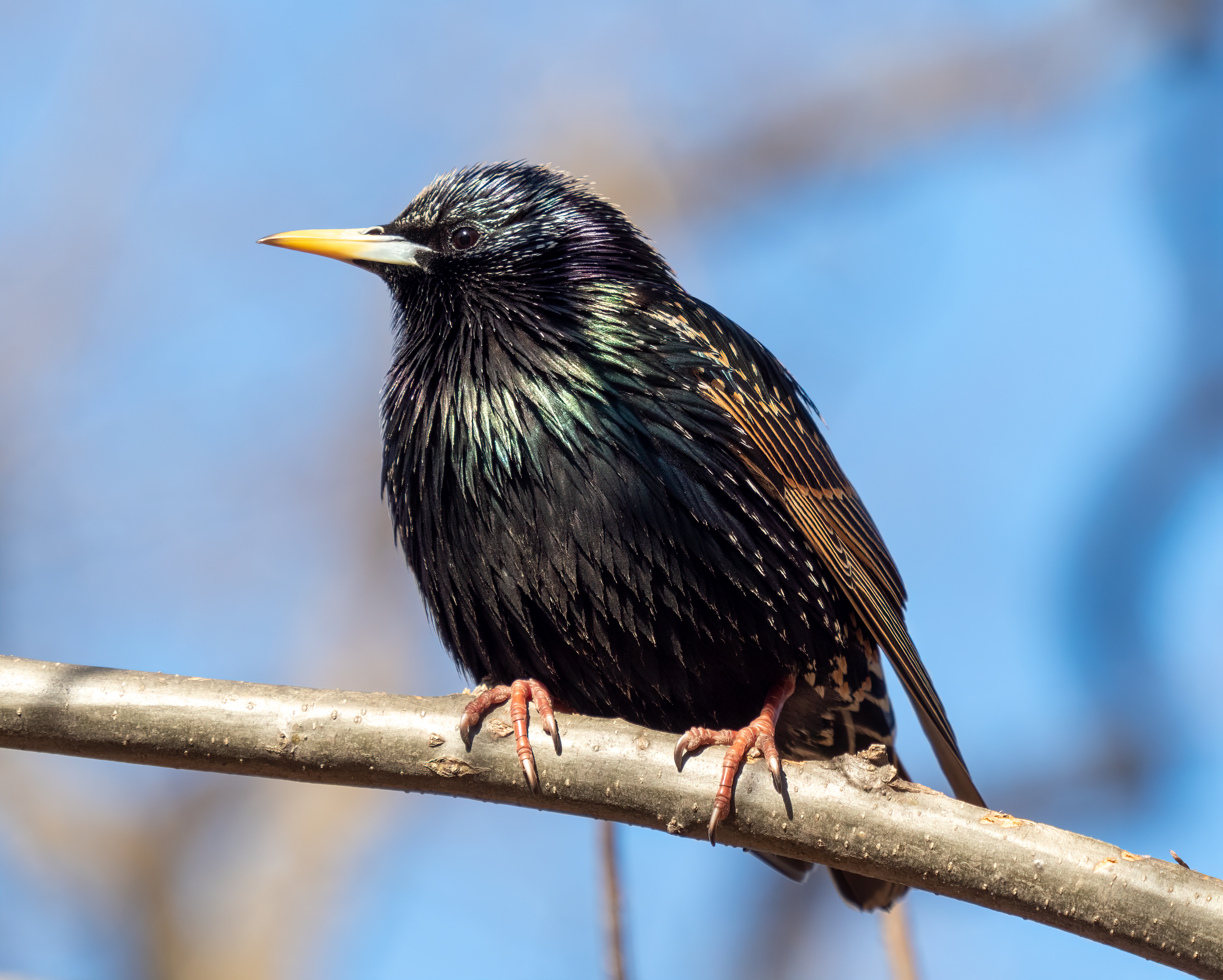
A European starling in Central Park, where they were introduced in the late 19th century and became a destructive and widespread invasive species.

New York City was the site of several species introductions, including two which became widespread invasive species in the United States: house sparrows and European starlings. In the 1850s, linden moths were causing significant damage to plants in New York City, so the city imported house sparrows which they hoped would eat the caterpillars. Other cities did similarly, only to learn that house sparrows prefer to eat seeds and grain for most of their lifecycle. However, the birds are aggressive, rapidly multiplying and pushing out native species. One of the people who pushed for the sparrows' import was pharmacist and amateur ornithologist Eugene Schieffelin, who went on to lead the American Acclimatization Society, a group focused on introducing European species to North America.

In 1890–91, Schlieffelin and the society released about 100 pairs of European starlings in Central Park, mainly for aesthetic reasons. A common, though disputed, story is that Schieffelin was attempting to introduce every bird species mentioned in the works of William Shakespeare. In the following decades they spread across the country and grew to number in the hundreds of millions.

=== Habitat loss ===
Most of the rural parts of New York City were developed by the early 20th century, and its air and water quality suffered. Ornithologist Ludlow Griscom was critical of urban developments which destroyed bird habitats, and noted decreasing populations of some species as well as a reduction in the number of birds which breed in city parks. Several birds once known to breed in the city, like short-eared owls and upland sandpipers, have stopped due to the encroachment of human activities and destruction of their desired habitats. Even in the mid-20th century, continued development and overall reduction of open space exacerbated population decline.

=== Pesticide and rodenticide ===
Use of the pesticide DDT decimated raptor populations in the mid-20th century. The environmental movement, starting in the 1960s, helped to improve the quality of the city's air and water and raise awareness of the effects of DDT. The influential book by Rachel Carson, Silent Spring, credited with swaying public opinion about DDT, was in part based on research by New York City birder Joseph Hickey. Many raptor species have recovered, such as peregrine falcons which nest on buildings and atop most of the city's major bridges.

Rodenticide is used to curb the city's considerable rat population, but birds which prey on rats, like hawks and owls, can suffer from secondary rodenticide poisoning. A barred owl known as Barry was killed in the park in 2021 when she collided with a maintenance vehicle, perhaps affected by the quantity of rat poison inside her.

=== Light and window collision ===
The earliest records of birds colliding with glass in New York City are from 1887, when birds were seen colliding with the Statue of Liberty's torch when it was left on at night. The dead birds were sent to the American Museum of Natural History's ornithology department. NYC Bird Alliance has monitored numbers of birds killed in collisions with major buildings in the city since the late 1990s, launching Project Safe Flight in 1997. The initiative is modeled after Toronto's Fatal Light Awareness Program (FLAP), and involves working with building owners and policymakers to address collision fatalities. According to the organization, between 90,000 and 230,000 birds die due to collisions with New York City buildings each year as of 2019.

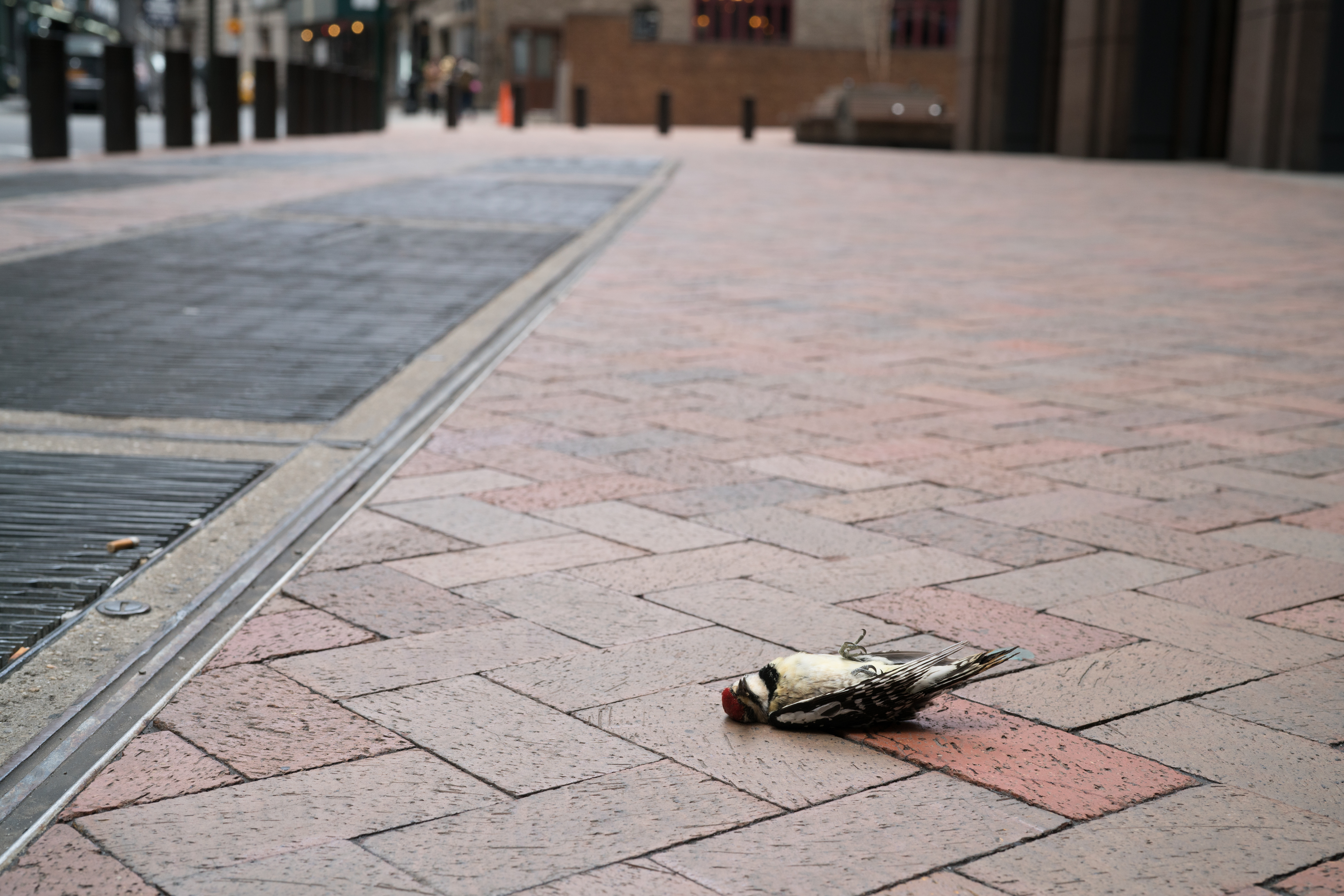
This yellow-bellied sapsucker (Sphyrapicus varius) in the Financial District was likely a window-strike victim.

Glass buildings in particular pose a danger to birds, which may be attracted to a reflection or interior lights. Ways to avoid bird–window collisions include signals, screens, films, fritting, and various other window treatments, but they can be costly to retrofit. Often it is only part of the building which causes problems for birds, and usually lower floors or where trees and other vegetation are reflected. The Morgan mail processing center in Chelsea installed an opaque cover over the windows after Bird Alliance members found high numbers of dead birds attracted to a particular reflection of London plane trees. 26 Federal Plaza and the former World Trade Center installed nets to protect birds on its lower floors. The IAC Building, by contrast, was constructed with a curved façade that does not create a perfect reflection and white bands on other windows.

The Jacob K. Javits Center, a large convention center on the west side of Manhattan with a space frame structure, earned a reputation as a major site of bird fatalities since it opened in 1986. A major renovation in the mid-2010s replaced its many glass panels with fritted glass that birds can see, thus decreasing bird fatalities by 90%. The improvements also added one of the largest green roofs in the country. In addition to being safer for birds, the changes resulted in a 26% lower energy bill for the building.

Artificial light sources can affect animal behavior in a variety of ways. Lights Out New York is an initiative started by NYC Bird Alliance which advocates for buildings to turn their lights off at night during key times of the year, typically after midnight during spring and fall migration. Nighttime lights attract birds, who can fly towards them and collide with a window. The Bloomberg administration endorsed the program in 2005. Tribute in Light, an annual event organized by the September 11 Memorial and Museum, memorializes the attacks by projecting two bright beams of light into the sky signifying the twin towers. It involves dozens of high-power lights shining upward into the sky, and since its first run in 2002, it was found to trap large numbers of migrating birds. A study conducted over seven years concluded that about 1.1 million birds were influenced in some way, likely disorienting them. To address the issue, organizers periodically turn off the lights, during which time birds disperse.

In 2019, New York City Council passed a law which requires all new construction or building alterations that replace exterior glazing to use bird friendly materials. It became law in 2020 and applies to construction projects starting in January 2021. In December 2021, New York City Council unanimously passed two bills applicable to city-owned buildings: one which requires outdoor lights to be turned off during peak migration times, and another which mandates the installation of occupancy sensors to turn interior lights off when unnecessary.

=== Bird alerts ===
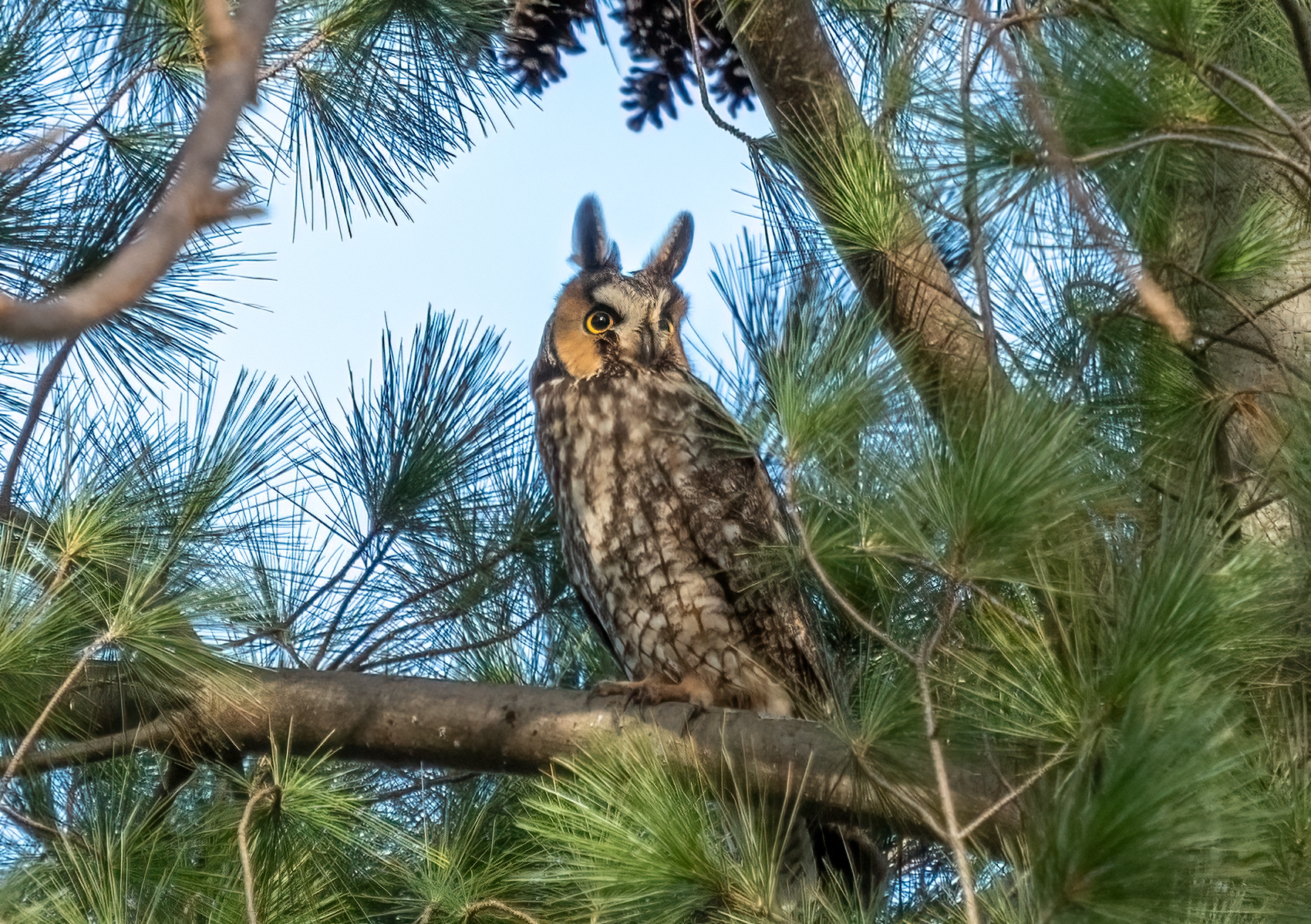
Most owls, like this long-eared owl (Asio otus) in Central Park, are considered sensitive species. Broadcasting their location is controversial in the birding community.

Birders are known for sharing information with each other about the locations of unusual birds for recreation, documentation, or competition, and have used a variety of technologies to do so. Starting in the 1950s, telephone hotlines centralized reports using answering machines, replacing calling trees and becoming an important part of birding culture. The Audubon Society and Linnaean Society co-sponsored a rare bird alerts (RBA) phone line in New York City starting around 1970, inspired by a system that started in Boston in the 1950s. The hotline, called the Metropolitan Rare Bird Alert System, allowed birders to call in to hear a recording listing rare species seen in the area, including detailed directions of how to find them. Susan Roney Drennan wrote in American Birds that the NYC line was the "creme de la creme of RBAs", with recordings typically running about six minutes including detailed descriptions of birds and directions to see them, as well as upcoming bird-related events, and current conservation issues. "A new caller senses he is watching, from a box seat, the current ornithological pageant pass in view". As of 1973, when The New York Times wrote about it, it received about 500 calls per week.

The internet has made it easier to share sightings and track what species other people have seen, and whereas the phone systems were updated only once or a few times per week, social media in particular makes it easy to share sightings instantly and with large audiences on platforms like Facebook, Reddit, or Twitter, where sightings have been shared via hashtags since at least 2011. Developments in GPS and navigation tools enable sharing precise locations instantly, or even custom maps. In a densely populated place like New York City, this can result in a large crowd of people flocking to see a rare bird.

The practice is both popular and controversial. Proponents of bird alerts appreciate the opportunity to see a rare bird and argue that it promotes greater appreciation of birds and nature in general among the public. Opponents argue the crowds are harmful, both because of the number of people and because the publicity draws not just ethical birders but members of the public who may not prioritize the well-being of the bird over their own curiosity or desire for photos. Organizations like NYC Bird Alliance specifically criticize sharing information about sensitive birds such as owls, which rest during the day and hunt at night. The Cornell Lab of Ornithology maintains rare bird alerts for each of the New York City counties which are delivered by email on a daily or hourly basis, but restricts some information about sensitive species and the audience is not as broad as social media platforms provide.

The New York Times characterized the issue as "a vigorous debate ... roiling the city's birding community". It highlighted a set of Twitter accounts, Manhattan Bird Alert and its counterparts for other boroughs, which have tens of thousands of followers. The operator, David Barrett, aims to "make everyone's birding more effective" and draw people to a new hobby, and they have been credited with introducing birds and birding to new audiences. Some birds followed by the accounts went on to become celebrities, like the Central Park mandarin duck and Flaco the owl. But the accounts have also received a backlash among some birders and conservationists concerned for the well-being of the birds. Ken Chaya of the Linnaean Society of New York highlighted "a fine line between sharing information about a sensitive bird and creating a flash mob". Aubudon magazine, writing about the New York City Twitter alerts, said the operator's "prominence and the backlash against him are emblematic of tensions playing out on smaller stages across the country."

=== Off-leash dogs ===
Brooklyn's Prospect Park is a busy urban park with a ride range of public uses. Among them are dog-walking and other kinds of recreation people engage in with their dogs. The park does not allow dogs to be off-leash except in dedicated locations, and only for a few hours early in the morning and at night. There are frequent conflicts between dog owners who allow their dogs to go off-leash at other times and in other places, including bird habitats, and birders, park rangers, and other park-goers.

In addition to scaring away birds, dogs allowed to run around the forested areas of the park can destroy an important bird habitat that migrants rely on. The Brooklyn Bird Club has lobbied the New York City Parks Department and the Prospect Park Alliance to do more to enforce existing rules while other associations of dog owners argue for more access to off-leash space. In general, off-leash rules are only occasionally enforced, in part because of the size of the parks relative to park staffing.

=== Central Park birdwatching incident ===
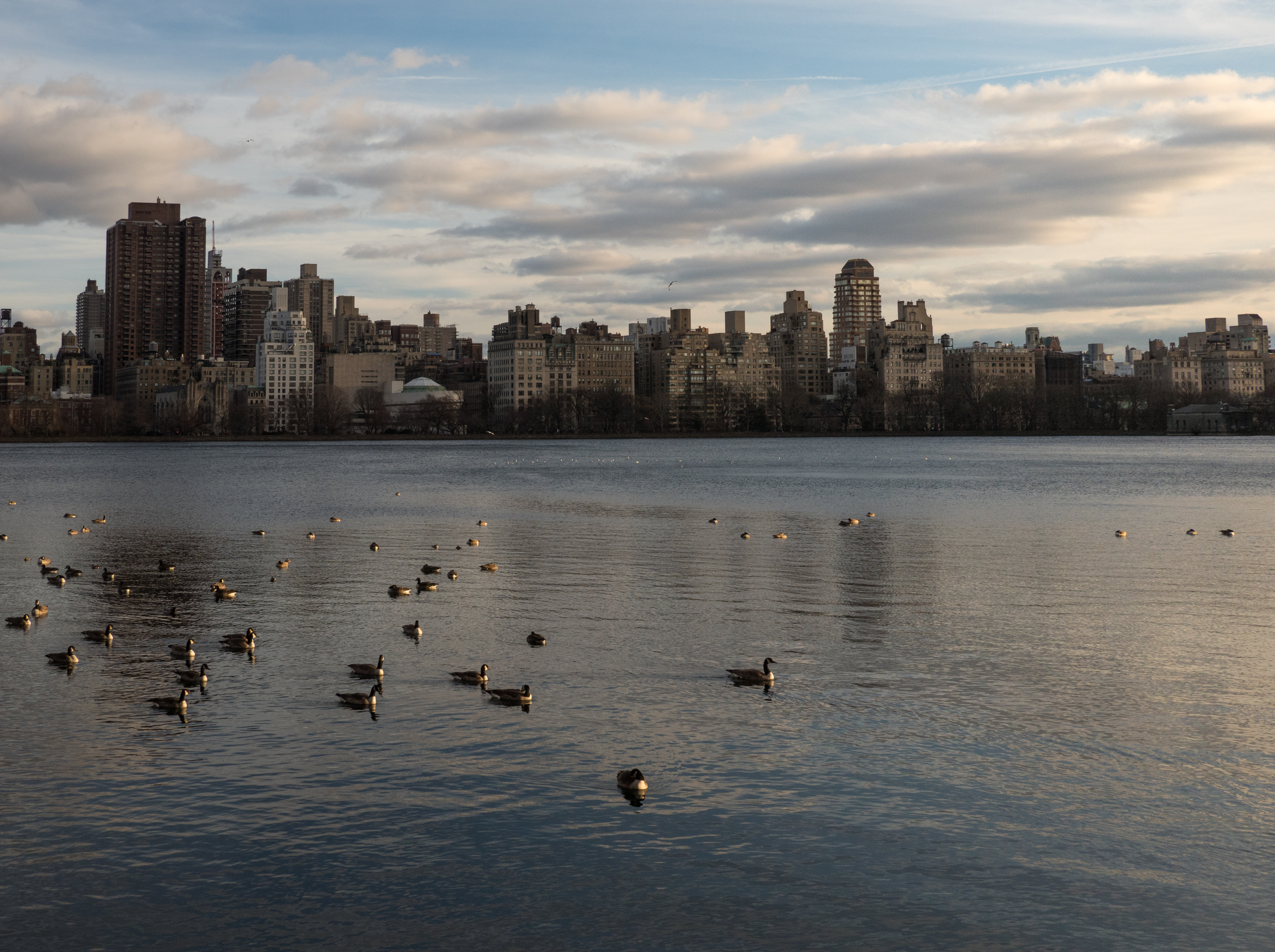
Canada geese (Branta canadensis) visiting the Central Park reservoir

In May 2020 there was a confrontation in the Central Park Ramble between Amy Cooper, a white woman walking her dog off-leash, and Christian Cooper, a black man who was in the park birding. Dogs are required to have a leash in the Ramble, and when the woman refused to leash it, Christian Cooper beckoned to the dog with a dog treat. This led to Amy Cooper calling 9-1-1 and emphasizing his race in a request for police attention. Christian Cooper recorded the latter part of the conflict, and the video went viral on the internet. The resulting attention led to state legislation classifying as a hate crime the false reporting of criminal incidents by members of protected groups. It also drew attention to racial disparities among birders and inspired the creation of Black Birders Week.

=== Sound playback ===
Some birders use recordings of bird sounds to help them identify birds in the wild. Others may use a technique known as "pishing", making a sound that may attract some species in order to get a closer look. A prominent bird walk guide in Central Park, Robert DeCandido, uses pishing as well as a powered Bluetooth speaker connected to a smartphone to amplify various bird songs, warning calls, and other sounds to attract birds for those on his walks. The practice has attracted controversy in the local bird community. DeCandido claims using audio playback does not cause harm and only briefly distracts the birds while others regard the tactics as unethical in the way they disturb or affect the behavior of birds.

== Organizations and institutions ==
New York City is home to several organizations dedicated to birding, ornithology, or bird conservation, as well as a natural history museum, school clubs, a wildlife rehabilitation center, and other natural societies which overlap with birding.

=== Linnaean Society of New York ===
The Linnaean Society of New York was founded in 1878, making it one of the oldest ornithological associations in the United States. Though its scope is the natural world, it has long had a focus on birds. It primarily serves people and places in the New York City area, and has a long-standing relationship with the American Museum of Natural History. New York magazine called it a "topflight bird group" in 1978, and said that "sooner or later, most serious birders link up with" it.

=== Audubon Societies and NYC Bird Alliance ===
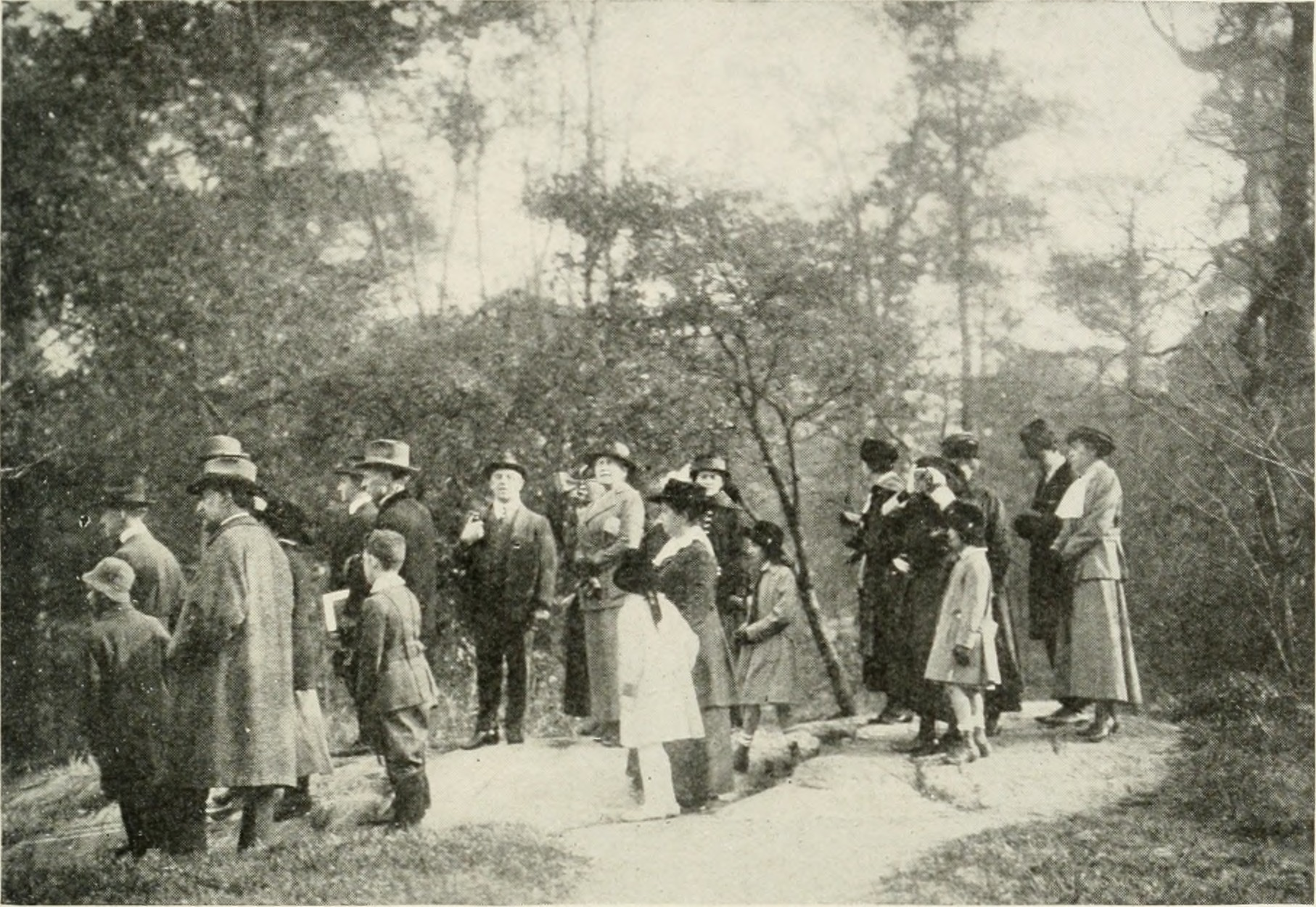
"A bird walk in Central Park" (1917), organized by the Audubon Society

The National Audubon Society, a non-profit environmental organization dedicated to conservation of birds and their habitats, is headquartered in New York City. The original Audubon Society was founded by George Bird Grinnell in 1886, in response to widescale killing of birds for variety of reasons, including hunting for the hat trade. The organization attracted 39,000 members in its first year, but only lasted for a few years, followed by the creation of several regional organizations with the same name and mission, including the New York chapter in the late 1890s. The national organization was founded in 1905. The various Audubon groups are visible and active in pursuit of bird conservation, establishing the Christmas Bird Count, managing sanctuaries, and working for public policy changes like a prohibition on plume hunting, the 1918 Migratory Bird Treaty Act, and a ban on DDT.

NYC Bird Alliance formed in 1979 as New York City Audubon. It coordinated protests of the removal of a nest belonging to a red-tailed hawk named Pale Male, which became a minor local celebrity. It started Project Safe Flight in 1997 to monitor and address window collisions, and Lights Out New York Like in 2005 to work with building owners to turn lights off at night during migration. The organization changed its name in 2024 to distance itself from John James Audubon, who was a slave-owner and anti-abolitionist.

=== Brooklyn Bird Club ===
The Brooklyn Bird Club was founded in 1909 by Edward Vietor. In addition to hosting regular walks and field trips for members and the public, it publishes the Clapper Rail magazine and participates in Christmas Bird Counts and Winter Waterfowl Counts.

=== Bronx County Bird Club ===
Nine teenagers from the Bronx founded the Bronx County Bird Club on November 29, 1924, meeting in one of the co-founders' parents' attic. Among the founders were Allan D. Cruickshank and Joseph Hickey, who went on to become ornithologists. Roger Tory Peterson, a naturalist and illustrator from western New York, was also admitted as a member due to his skills as a birder. They maintained bird feeders in Van Cortlandt Park, the Bronx Botanical Gardens, and Hunts Point, and participated in yearly Christmas Bird Counts. Several members went on to get involved with the Linnaean Society of New York. The club became less active as the members moved away or pursued other activities, but the surviving members met up for a 50th anniversary reunion in 1978. An article in American Birds notes the club's outsized influence, considering its membership never exceeded twelve, due to the dedication of its young founding members and cooperation with the Linnaean Society and American Museum of Natural History.

=== Queens County Bird Club ===
The Queens County Bird Club was founded in 1932 and continues to lead walks and field trips in Queens and the New York City area. Members also participate in the Christmas Bird Count and Waterfowl Count. It used to meet in the Queens Botanical Garden's administration building, and later in the Alley Pond Environmental Center.

=== Wild Bird Fund ===
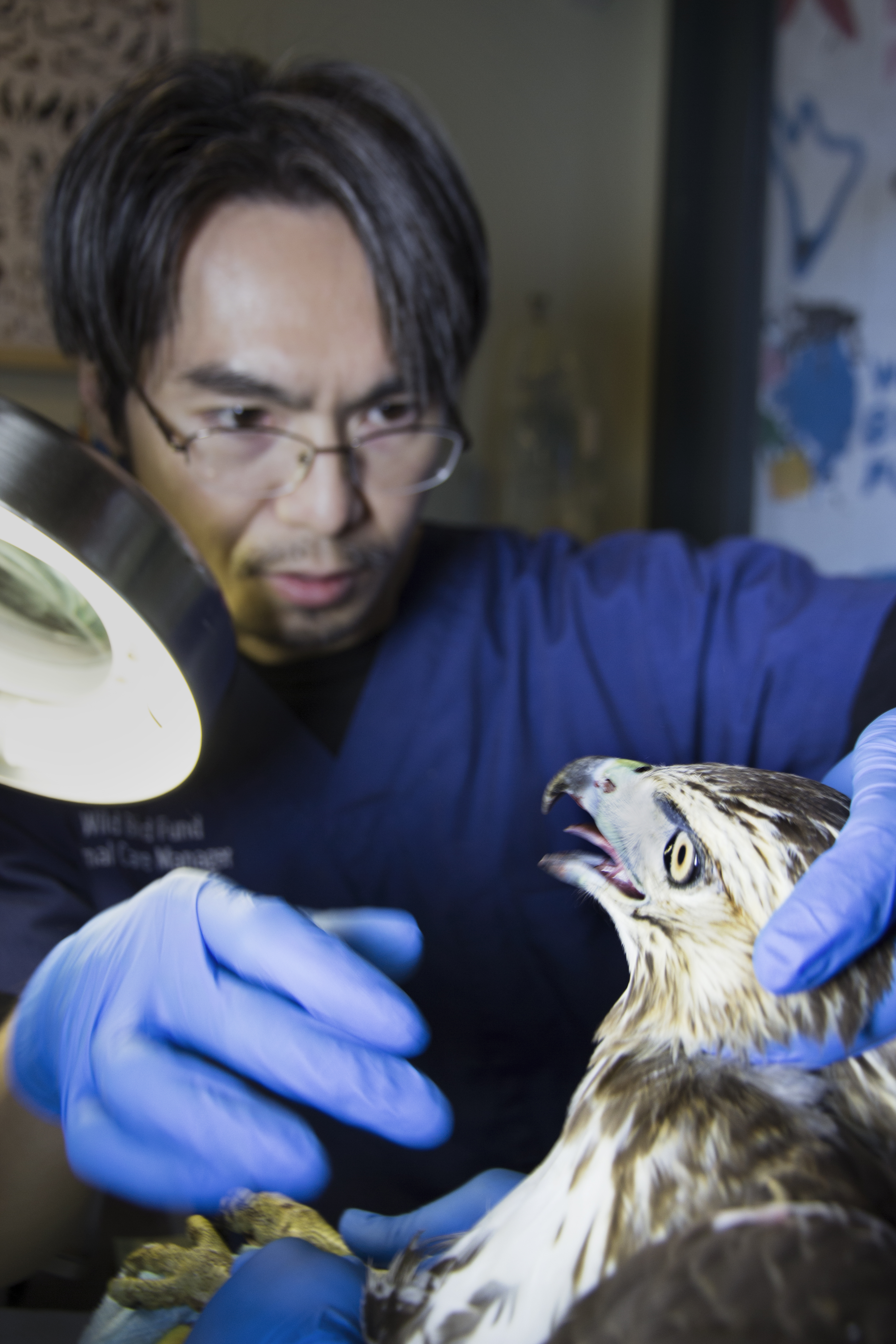
A veterinary technician examines a red-tailed hawk at the Wild Bird Fund.

The Wild Bird Fund is the city's first and only wild animal hospital. It was founded in 2001 by Rita McMahon after she found an injured Canada goose and could not find a veterinarian who would treat wildlife. She ran a hospital out of her apartment at first, incorporating as a non-profit in 2005. It opened a dedicated facility on Columbus Avenue on Manhattan's Upper West Side in 2012, treating up to 400 birds at a time and 7,000 yearly patients as of 2020.

=== Feminist Bird Club ===
The Feminist Bird Club was founded in New York City in 2016 as a birding organization which prioritizes inclusivity, social justice, and creating a welcoming environment for diverse birders. Founder Molly Adams was initially motivated to go birding with a group for safety reasons, but wanted to form a group which specifically invited participation from people who may feel socially or politically marginalized. It was also around the time of the 2016 presidential election, when feminism was a prominent part of public discourse. Group outings are intended to be supportive rather than competitive, and respectful of a range of experience levels. As of March 2022, the club has grown to have 20 chapters across the United States and others in the Netherlands, Canada, and Scotland.

=== NYC Plover Project ===
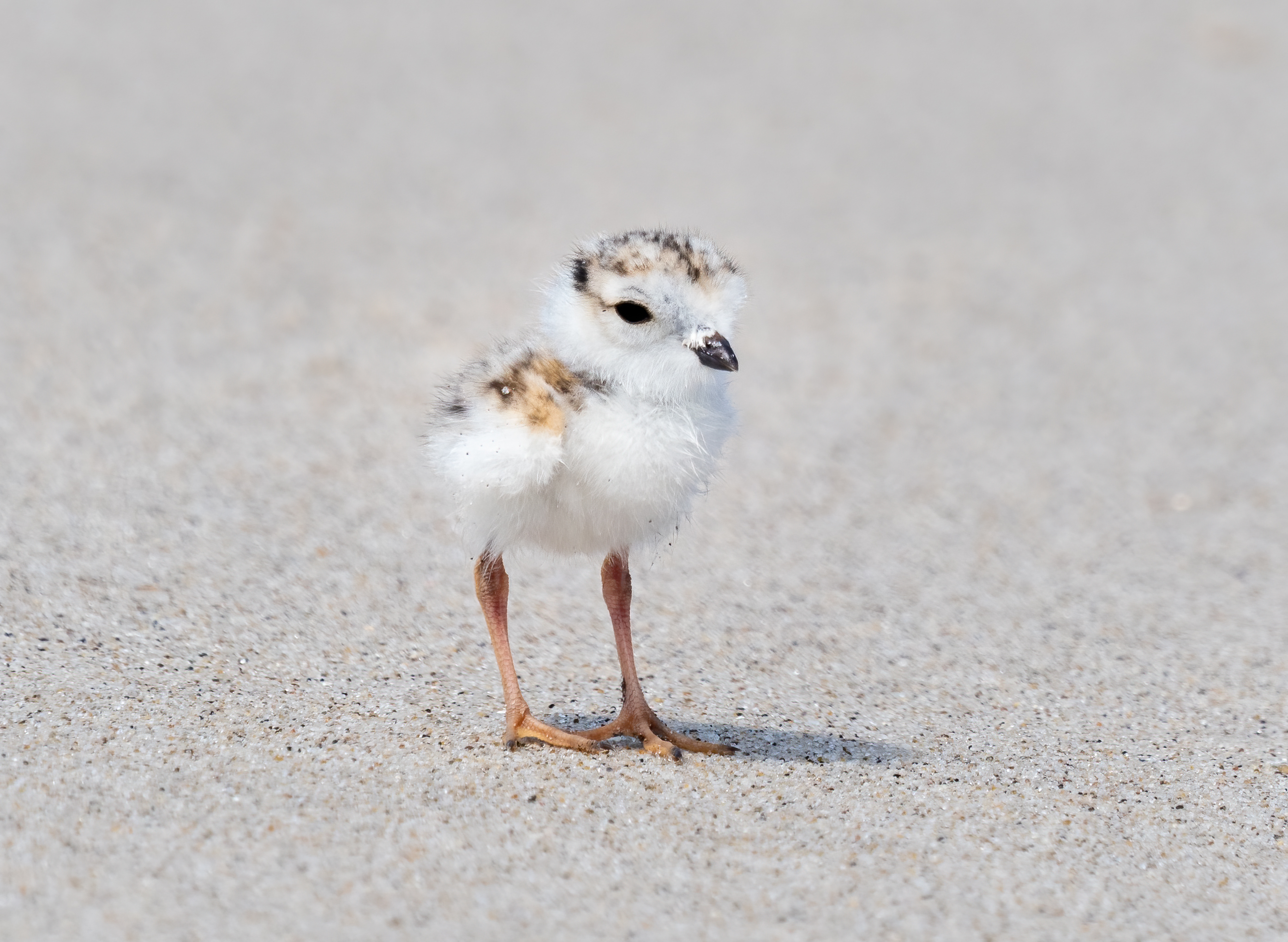
A piping plover chick on the beach in Queens.

Piping plovers are small shorebirds which nest on beaches. Their habitats have largely disappeared in large part due to human development. They were considered endangered in the 1980s, with only 722 nesting pairs remaining. Since then, conservation efforts, which involve fencing off portions of beaches during breeding season, have succeeded in multiplying the population. The plovers are now considered near threatened, and remain vulnerable to a number of dangers. They have several predators, including ghost crabs, other birds like gulls, and raccoons. Their small size and camouflage make them and their nests easy to accidentally harm.

In New York City, piping plovers primarily nest in the Rockaways on beaches like Rockaway Beach, Fort Tilden, and Breezy Point. The New York City Plover Project was founded in 2021 to watch over the birds, educate beach-goers, and try to enforce existing regulations. To do so, it partners with Park Police, Gateway National Recreation Center, the Audubon Society, and the Jamaica Bay-Rockaway Park Conservancy. Volunteers with the organization patrol sections of the beach and try to tell people about the birds and why the regulations exist. This can lead to conflict in rare cases, when beach-goers resent or ignore rules regarding fenced off areas, off-leash dogs, flying kites, or setting off fireworks.

=== Other organizations ===
- American Acclimatization Society, a group dedicated to introducing European flora and fauna into North American for economic and cultural reasons. It was founded in New York City in 1871, and several foreign bird species were introduced to the city. Members, like chairman Eugene Schieffelin, transported species across the Atlantic Ocean to release them in the US. Most of the species did not succeed, with a notable exception of European starlings, which Schieffelin released in Central Park and now number in the hundreds of millions across the country, becoming a destructive invasive species.
- American Littoral Society, a conservation, research, and education organization focused on coastal habitats. It is headquartered in New Jersey but has an office on Jamaica Bay in Queens, near the Jamaica Bay Wildlife Refuge. It is involved in a variety of projects to preserve, restore, and educate about bird habitats around Jamaica Bay.
- American Museum of Natural History, a natural history museum on the Upper West Side of Manhattan. The museum, which opened in 1871, has multiple halls dedicated to birds: The Sanford Hall of North American Birds, Hall of Birds of the World, and Whitney Memorial Hall of Oceanic Birds.
- Central Park Conservancy
- The Metropolitan Museum of Art is not a natural history museum, but includes in its collections many artistic depictions of birds and has hosted bird-themed exhibitions. Several people, including museum staff, have written about "birding at the Met".
- New York City Parks Department
- Prospect Park Alliance

== Notable birders and ornithologists ==
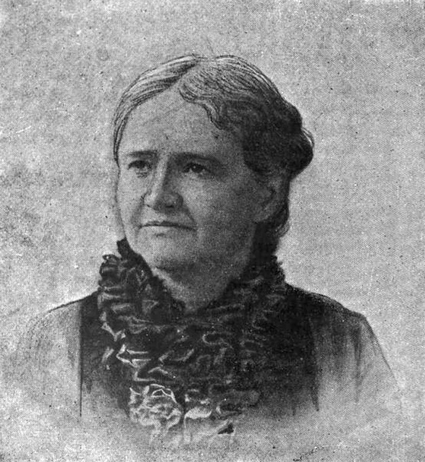
Harriet Mann Miller, who lived in Brooklyn for several years, wrote several books and articles about birds under the pen name Olive Thorne Miller

- John James Audubon (1785–1851), artist, naturalist, and ornithologist known for his illustrations in books like The Birds of America. He is buried in Trinity Church Cemetery at Broadway and 155th Street in Manhattan.
- Florence Merriam Bailey (1863–1948), ornithologist, birder, and nature writer. Her book, Birds Through a Looking-Glass (1890), encouraged people to study wild, live birds in their environment rather than captured, dead birds.
- Frank Chapman (1864–1945), ornithologist who worked at the American Museum of Natural History and wrote several field guides. He was involved in early efforts to stop the use of birds in the fashion industry, conducting a "census" of bird species used in people's hats on the streets of Manhattan.
- Allan D. Cruickshank (1907–1974), who co-founded the Bronx County Bird Club in his youth, was an ornithologist who worked to educate the public about birds. He served as president of the Linnean Society of New York and worked for the Audubon Society for decades, where he was also a staff photographer.
- Christian Cooper (b. 1963), science writer and editor. His involvement in the 2020 Central Park birdwatching incident led to the creation of Black Birders Week.
- Mark Dion (b. 1961), conceptual artist who incorporates birds into his work. A 2003 New York Times article focused on appreciating the birds in art at the Metropolitan Museum of Art, an idea he got when taking a break from birding in Central Park, where the museum is situated.
- Jonathan Franzen (b. 1959), novelist and essayist who was one of the main characters in the documentary, Birders: The Central Park Effect.
- Ludlow Griscom (1890–1959), ornithologist who popularized the use of field marks for identifying birds, and prominent member of the Linnaean Society of New York who was known for rigorous vetting of bird sighting reports. In 1923, he published Birds of the New York City Region.
- Joseph Hickey (1907–1993), an ornithologist who wrote Guide to Bird Watching. Hickey, along with his research on peregrine falcons, was instrumental in activism to ban organochlorine pesticides like DDT.
- Ernst Mayr (1905–2005), evolutionary biologist who worked as a curator in the American Museum of Natural History.
- Harriett Mann Miller (1831–1918), author, naturalist, and ornithologist who wrote about birds in books and magazines using the pen names Olive Thorne and Olive Thorne Miller.
- Roger Tory Peterson (1908–1996), naturalist, ornithologist, illustrator and educator. He did not live in New York City, but was active in its birding community, including playing a leadership role in the Bronx County Bird Club.
- Starr Saphir (1939–2013), led bird walks in Central Park for nearly four decades.
- Gabriel Willow (b. 1978), environmental educator who has led bird walks in New York City since 1999.

== Celebrity birds ==
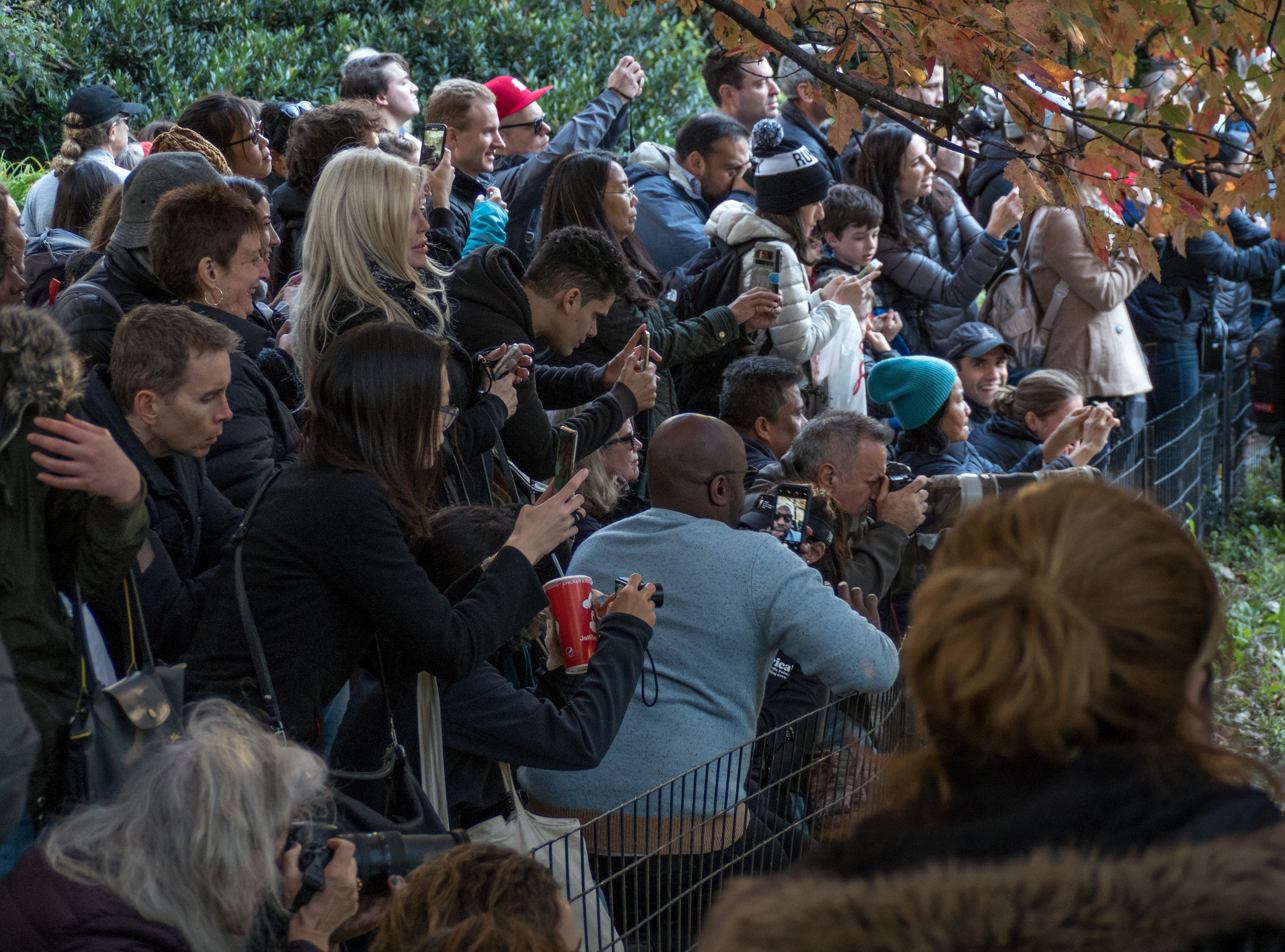
A crowd of people gathered to see the Central Park mandarin duck in November 2018.

Unusual bird sightings in New York City attract enough public interest to receive media attention, sometimes granting a level of celebrity to the bird. When a snowy owl was seen in Central Park in 2021, for example, large crowds converged to see it. Snowy owls are not rare in the region, but are very uncommon in Manhattan, and it was the first seen in Central Park in 130 years. It was only seen in the park for one day, but it was enough to attract local, national, and international news coverage. Rare bird sightings also spark debate over the well-being of the birds, which sometimes appear outside of their usual ranges or during a time of year when they should be further south. When two calliope hummingbirds arrived in Fort Tryon Park in the winter of 2001, they attracted hundreds of people and led to consideration of whether or not to intervene to save the birds, which are not equipped to survive a New York winter.

- Astoria, a female wild turkey that has resided in New York City since 2024.
- Barry, a barred owl which stayed in Central Park for several months in 2020–21. Her stay was the longest recorded of a barred owl in Central Park, ending only when she was killed in a collision with a Central Park Conservancy van.
- Flaco, a Eurasian eagle-owl which escaped from Central Park Zoo following an act of vandalism in February 2023, and subsequently took up residence in Central Park.
- Mandarin Patinkin, a mandarin duck also known as the "Hot Duck" which was seen in Central Park in late 2018 and early 2019. Its colorful appearance, which contrasted with native waterfowl, combined with its presence far outside the species' native range of East Asia, lent it celebrity status. Bette Midler later wrote a children's book about it.
- Pale Male, a male red-tailed hawk which has lived around Central Park since 1991. The removal of his nest by residents of 927 Fifth Avenue led to protests in 2004, followed by its replacement. There are two documentaries and three children's books about Pale Male, a puppet modeled after him was featured on Late Night with Conan O'Brien, and he is the mascot of PS 6.
- Rockefeller "Rocky", a female northern saw-whet owl discovered in the branches of the Rockefeller Center Christmas Tree in November 2020. The owl was inside a 75-foot Norway Spruce taken 170 miles from Oneonta, New York to New York City. After being discovered, the owl was treated at a wildlife rehabilitation facility and released back into the wild in upstate New York.
- Zelda, a female wild turkey that lived in the Battery between 2003 and 2014, believed to be the only wild turkey in Manhattan.
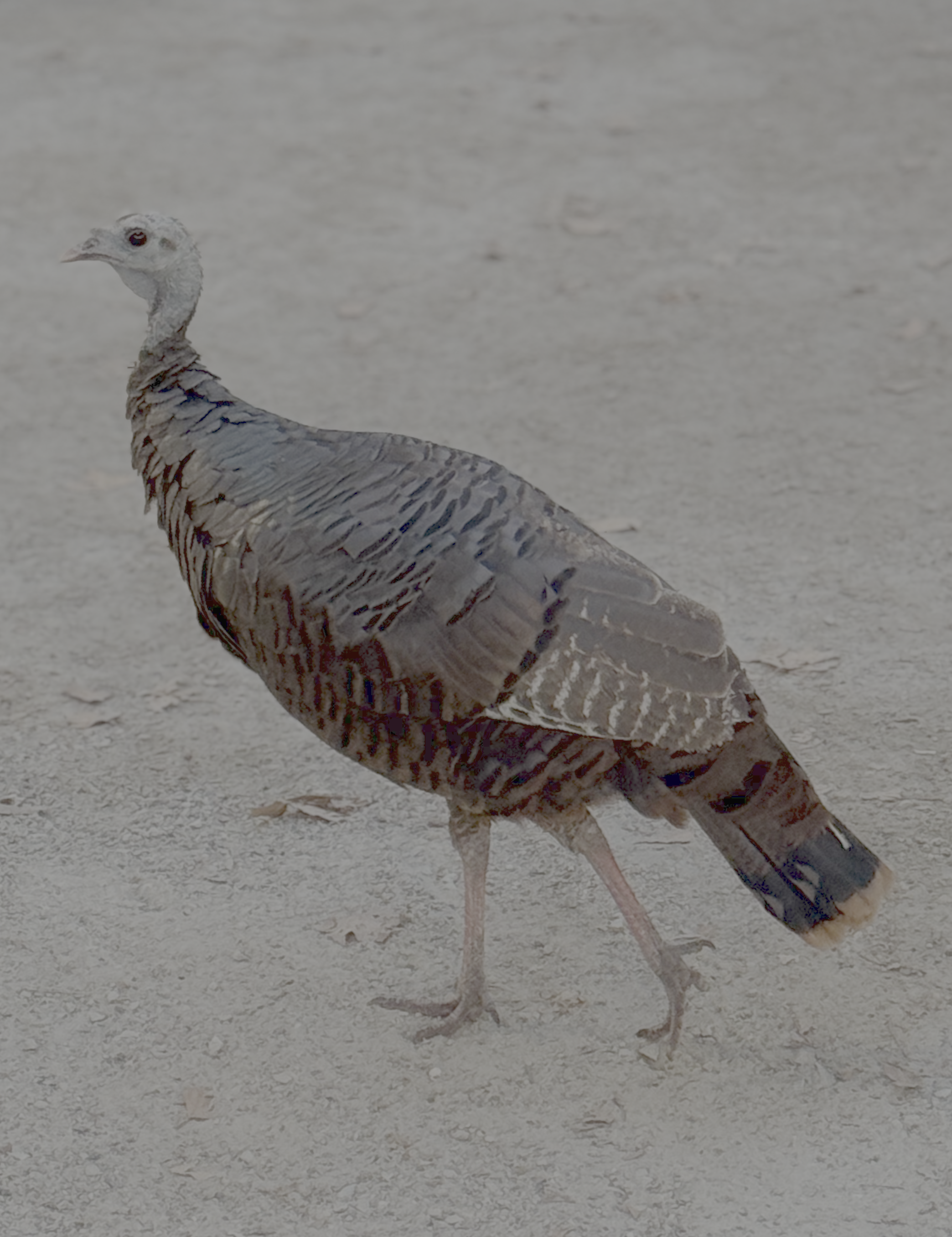
Astoria the turkey

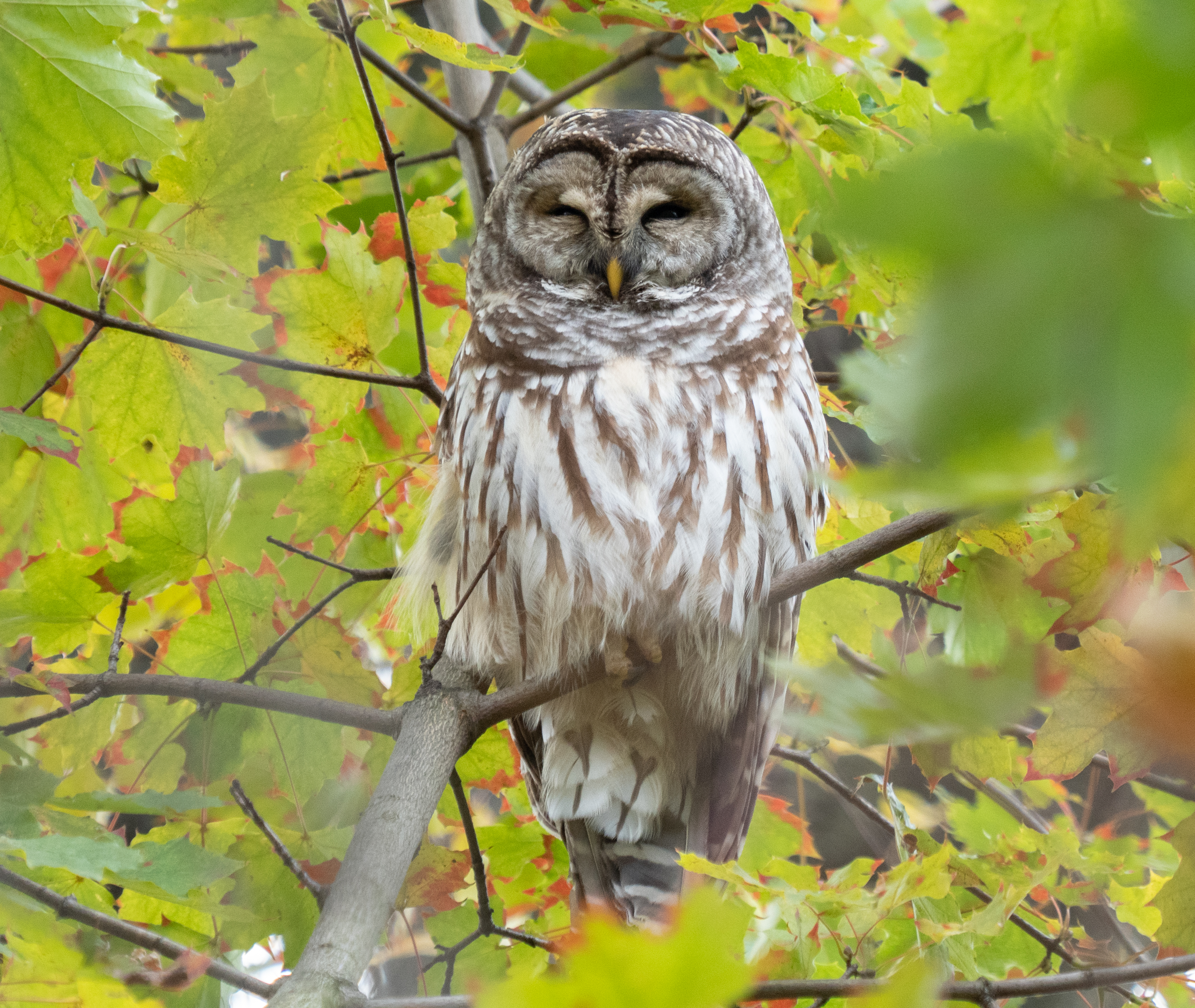
Barry the barred owl

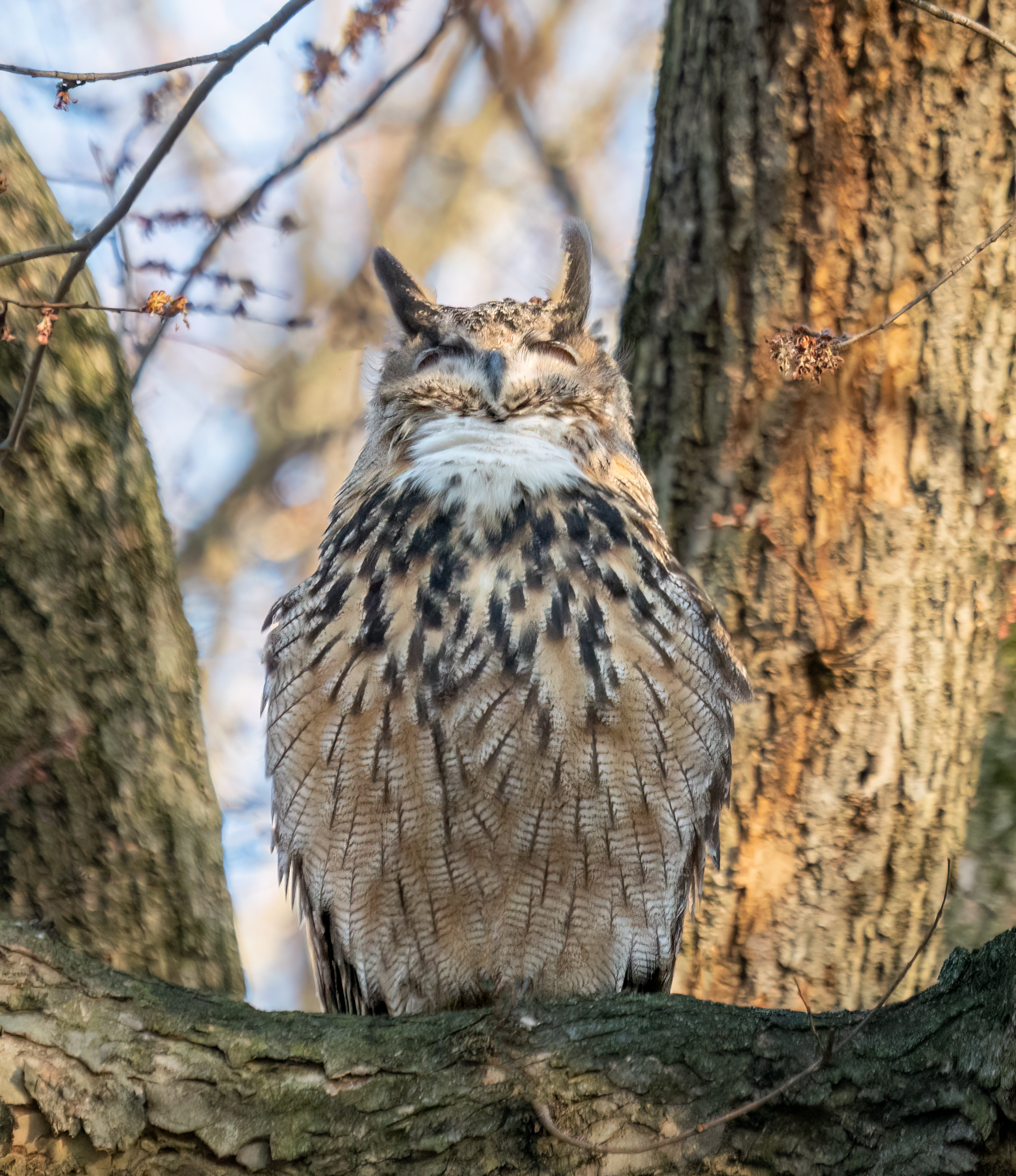
Flaco the Eurasian eagle-owl

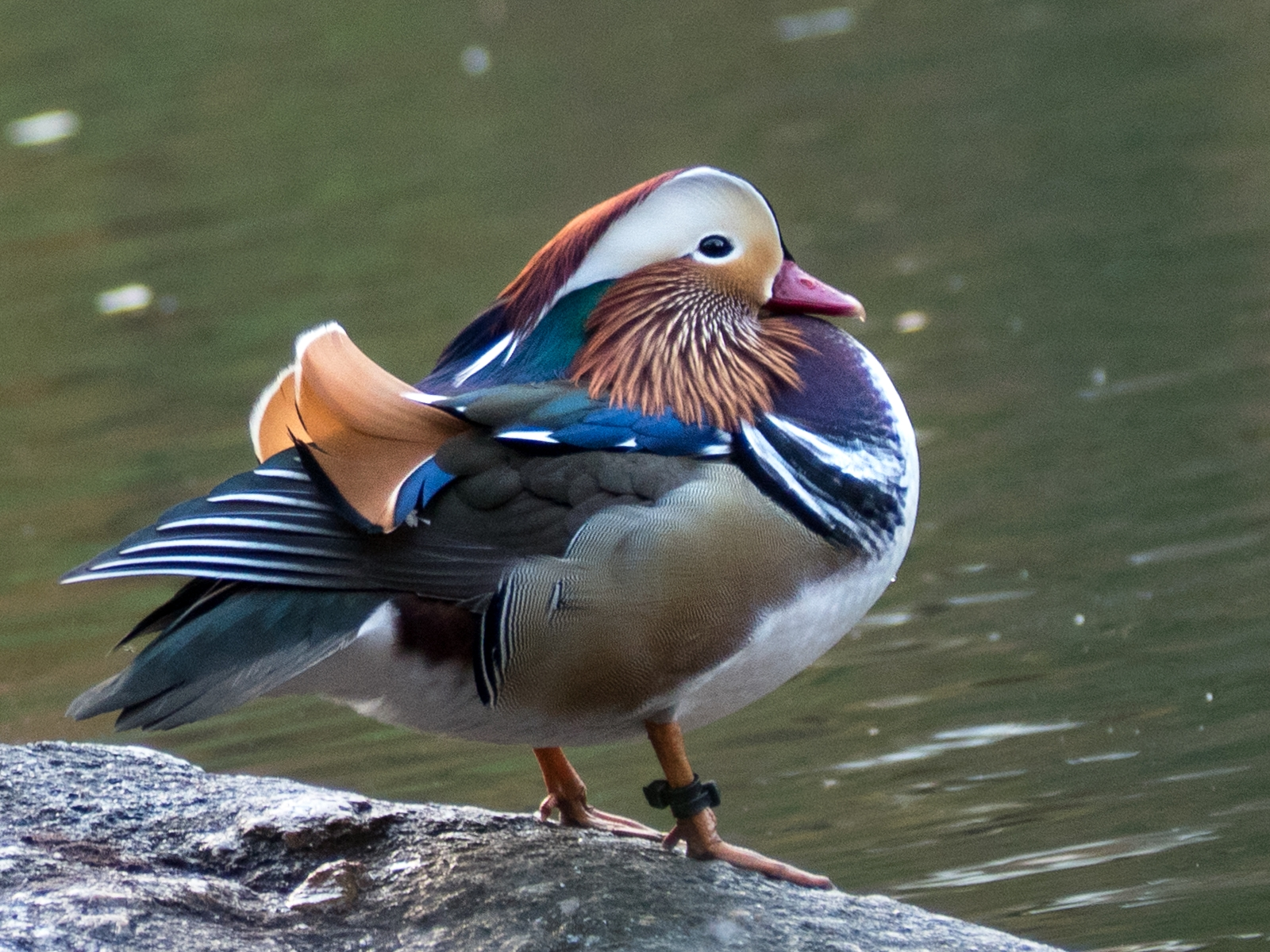
Central Park Mandarin duck

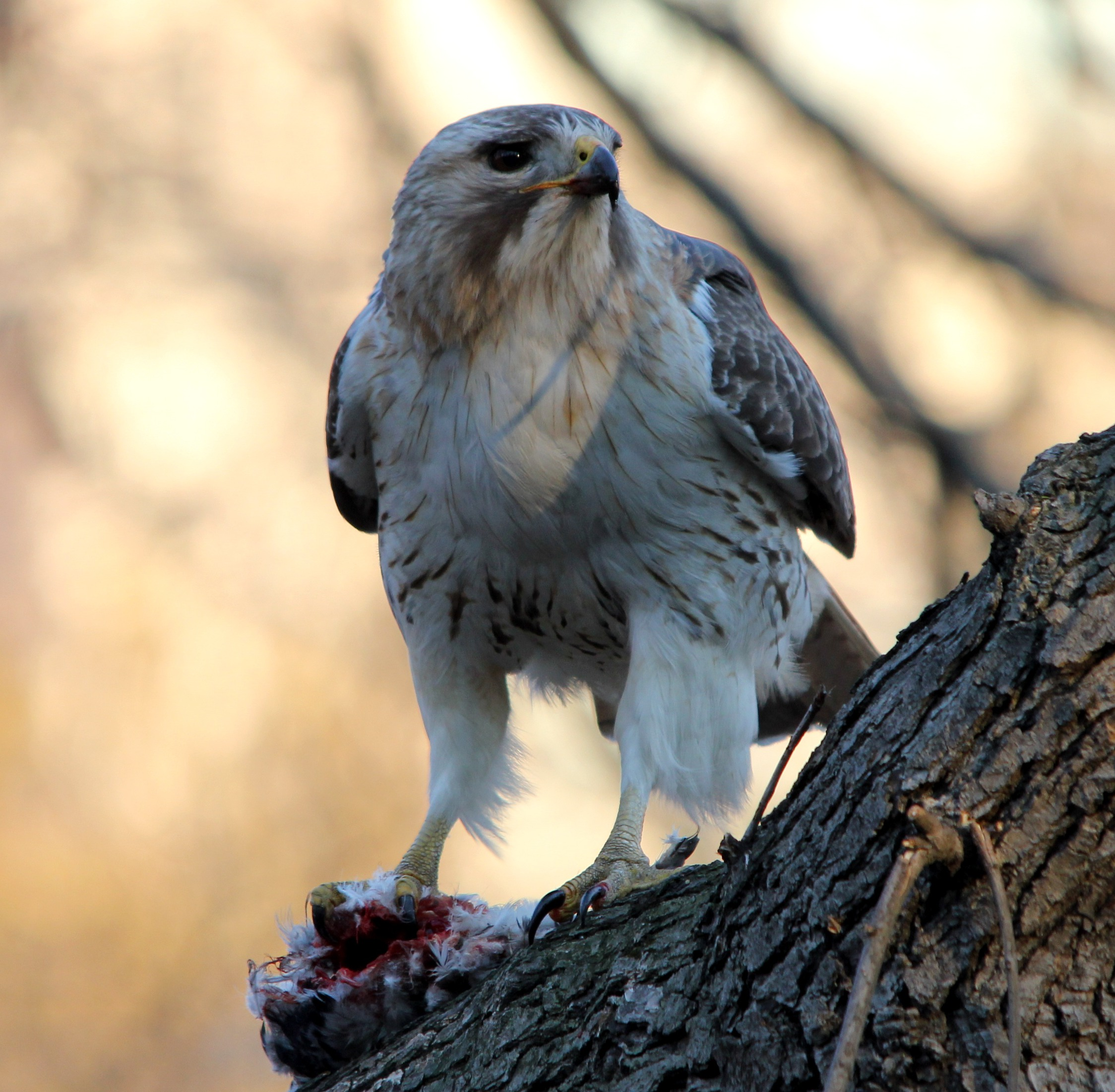
Pale Male the red-tailed hawk

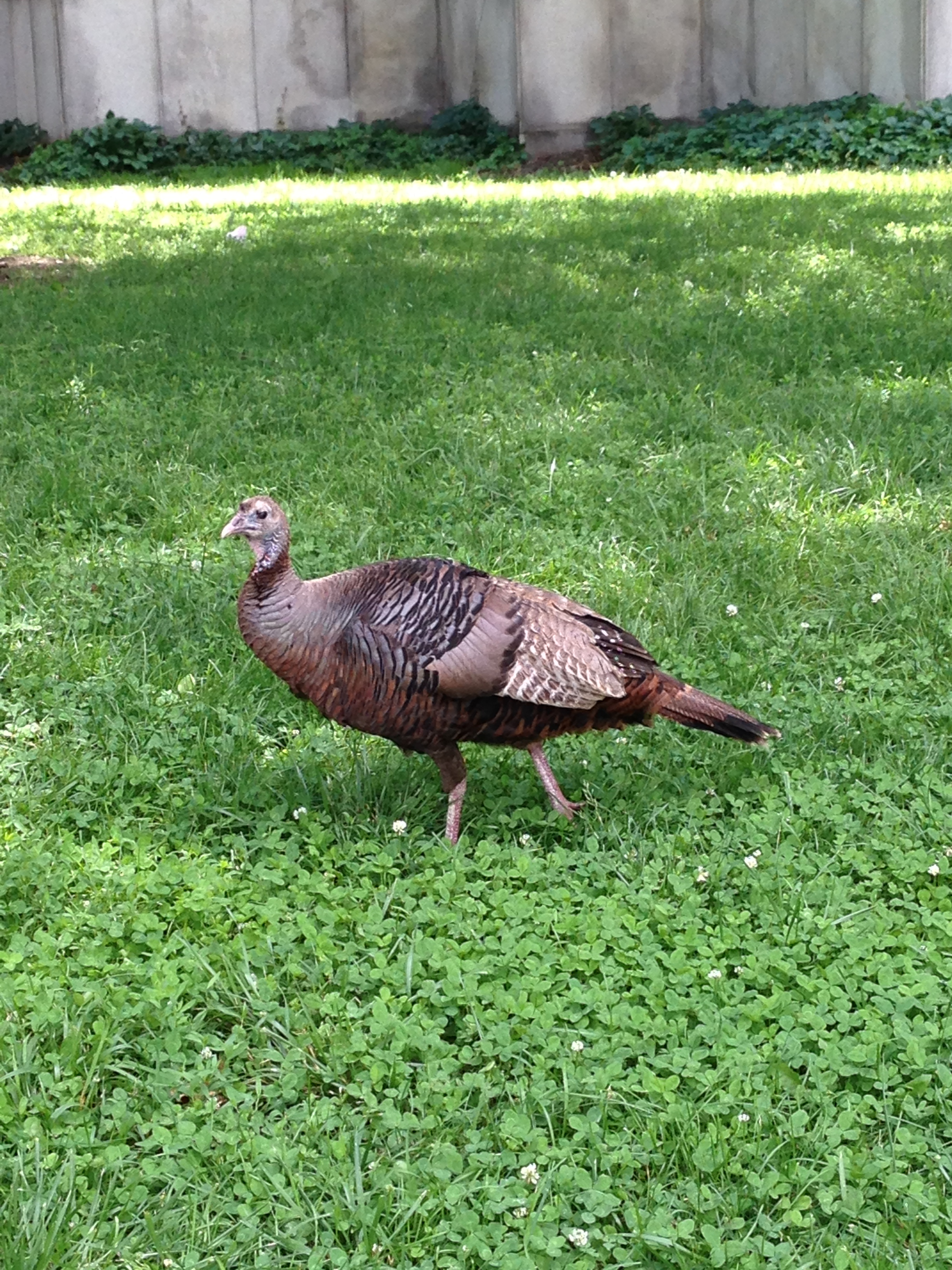
Zelda the wild turkey

== Books and other media ==
- Birds of the New York City Region (1923) by Stuart Griscom, published by the American Museum of Natural History with support by the Linnaean Society of New York. Griscom studied and promoted the use of field marks for bird identification, and put his ideas into practice with this book, focused on New York City. A reviewer for The Auk wrote that "it sets a standard and example for what ... might be termed the 'new ornithology'".
- Birds Around New York City (1942) by Allan Cruickshank, intended as a successor to Griscom's Birds of the New York City Region.
- Birders: The Central Park Effect (2012), a documentary about birding in Central Park, directed by Jeffrey Kimball

== See also ==
- Pigeons in New York City
