= BCBC =

BCBC may refer to:

- Balliol College Boat Club
- Brasenose College Boat Club
- Bronx County Bird Club
- Butler College Boat Club, the rowing club of Josephine Butler College, at Durham University in England
