= Joseph Hickey (ornithologist) =

American ornithologist

- Born: 16 April 1907
- Died: 31 August 1993
- Known for: research on the peregrine falcon
- Notable work: Guide to Bird Watching
- Scientific career
- Fields: ornithology
- Institutions: University of Wisconsin

Joseph James Hickey (16 April 1907 – 31 August 1993) was an American ornithologist who wrote the landmark Guide to Bird Watching and was instrumental in the activism that led to bans on organochlorine pesticides through his research work on the peregrine falcon. He was a professor of wildlife management at the University of Wisconsin where he obtained his master's degree under the guidance of Aldo Leopold.

Born in New York City, he had an introduction to outdoor life through a scout leader and took to birdwatching while also founding along with nine others, the Bronx County Bird Club where he was a close friend of Roger Tory Peterson and Allan Cruickshank. Unlike many others, he chose to study history at the New York University but kept an interest in birds, attending talks at the American Museum of Natural History where he met and was greatly influenced by Ernst Mayr who had only recently moved to the United States. Mayr joined their birding outings as well, to learn about American birds and Hickey recalled later that Mayr's advice was that "everybody's got to have a problem" in the sense that one needed a long-term question to work on systematically in order to advance understanding. Hickey was a champion 1-mile runner and was a track coach at New York University. Mayr suggested that Hickey should study biology, and this led to Hickey taking evening courses leading to a degree in biology.

He was then invited by Aldo Leopold to the University of Wisconsin in 1941, and he began studies towards a master's degree. In 1943 he wrote, as his master's dissertation, a Guide to Bird Watching which was a landmark publication inspired by the British work, The Art of Bird Watching by E.M. Nicholson. He later helped the posthumous publication of Aldo Leopold's Sand County Almanac in 1949.

He then moved, with his wife Margaret Brooks, to the University of Michigan with a Guggenheim Fellowship to work on a PhD on avian populations based on bird banding studies. He moved back to the University of Wisconsin and worked in the department of wildlife management there. His studies on peregrine falcons and the thinning of egg shells were critical in the banning of DDT in the US. He was also a popular and influential teacher.

Among the awards he received were the Aldo Leopold, the Arthur A. Allen and the Eisenmann Medals apart from an Elliott Coues Award.
