= Proceedings of the Linnean Society =

Proceedings of the Linnean Society or Proceedings of the Linnaean Society may refer to:

- Proceedings of the Linnean Society of London
- Proceedings of the Linnaean Society of New York
- Proceedings of the Linnean Society of New South Wales
