= Central Park mandarin duck =

Celebrity duck in New York City's Central Park

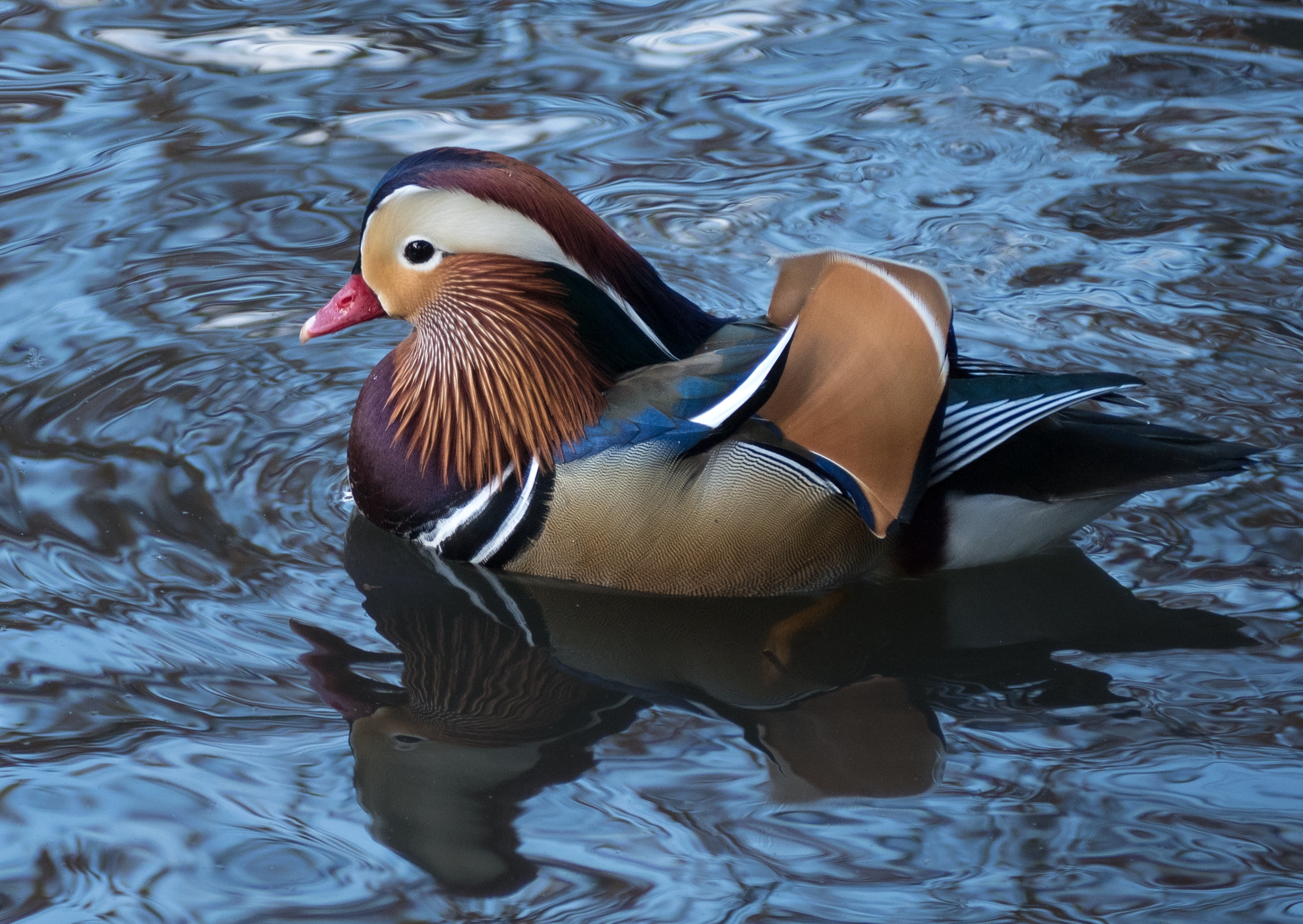
- The mandarin duck in Central Park in November 2018
- Species: Mandarin duck
- Sex: Male
- Residence: Central Park

The Central Park mandarin duck, also known as Mandarin Patinkin or the Hot Duck, was a male mandarin duck (Aix galericulata) seen at the Pond in New York City's Central Park starting in late 2018. His colorful appearance, which contrasted with native waterfowl, combined with his presence far outside of the species' native range of East Asia, led to media attention from late 2018 through 2019. Though he has a band around his leg, his origin is undetermined. His last sighting was in March 2019. In 2021, entertainer Bette Midler published a children's book about him. In 2023, filmmaker Kevin Schreck released a short documentary about the bird, The Duck of New York. The film had its world premiere at the 2023 Coney Island Film Festival.

== Sighting and public attention ==
The mandarin duck was first spotted at Central Park's Pond by birder Gus Keri in early October 2018. His appearance was disseminated by another birder, David Barrett, who operates the Twitter account Manhattan Bird Alert and was described as the duck's "kingmaker" and "de-facto PR spokesman". He quickly became a local celebrity, with the duck and the public's enthusiasm for him receiving national and international coverage, covered by the BBC, The New York Times, The Guardian, CNN, the People's Daily in China, and making front-page news as far away as the Los Angeles Times. Several vendors began producing and selling merchandise referencing or depicting the duck, turning him into a tourist attraction. The New York Times noted that it "[had] become an international celebrity. A living, breathing, quacking meme." The Associated Press dubbed the crowd following the duck "the quackarazzi". It has also been credited with sparking broader interest in birding in New York.

New York Magazine's The Cut initially covered it as "New York's Most Eligible Bachelor" in its Dating section and subsequently called him "Hot Duck", while the website Gothamist named it Mandarin Patinkin, after Broadway actor Mandy Patinkin.

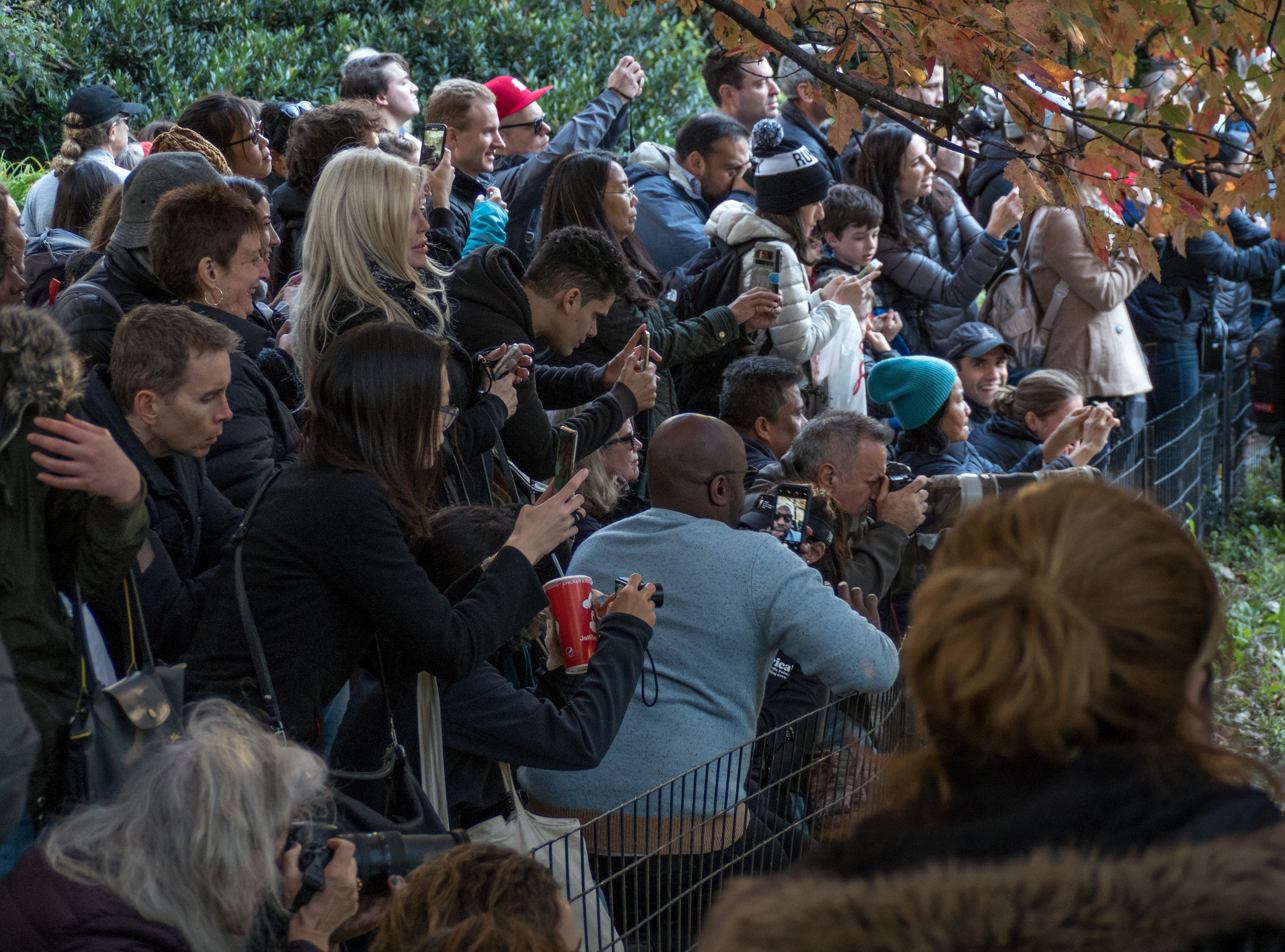
A crowd of people gathered to watch the duck in November 2018

Not long after his initial sighting, it disappeared for almost two weeks before returning to the Pond. Whenever the duck was not seen for a period of days or when he was seen somewhere other than Central Park, it received media coverage, such as when it showed up in Brooklyn or Edgewater, New Jersey. Multiple accounts describe "panic" among birdwatchers during these times. The website Quartz set up a website dedicated to tracking whether or not he had been spotted in Central Park that day.

Paul Sweet, Collection Manager in the Department of Ornithology at the American Museum of Natural History, criticized the enthusiasm for the duck. Though he credited the phenomenon with raising interest in birding, he pointed out the dangers that exotic species pose to native species in general and compared the experience of seeing an escaped duck in Central Park to seeing a bird in a zoo: "In British birder parlance, this is a 'plastic' duck, an escaped pet, one that can be bought online. He is not a rare bird or a first record or anything of that nature, so to me, of zero ornithological interest." Even within city limits, there are several other Mandarin ducks at zoos—at the majority of zoos nationwide, as well—according to AMNY; however, those captive birds never seemed to attract this level of public or media attention. Both Sweet and WNYC News urged redirecting public interest to the many attractive native species found in New York, like the North American wood duck, a native species that also frequents Central Park, and is the Mandarin duck's closest relative. Audubon editor Andrew Del-Colle echoed similar sentiments in an "open letter" to the duck, telling him that he was not "that special". Others criticized the behavior of people watching the bird for violating birding ethics by feeding him bread or trying to get him to move to where he could be seen more easily.

Gothamist's Jen Carlson likened its public attention to a cult, with its crowd of onlookers by the Central Park Pond "[taking] on an apocalyptic circus vibe on weekends. Part Audubon field trip, part Burning Man." In other articles, she wrote about some of the reasons he may have become so popular, making a comparison to the role of ducks in The Catcher in the Rye, symbolizing "all we have that is good anymore."

== Origin ==
In the Central Park Pond among mallards, with leg band visible

There are small populations of mandarin ducks in the United States formed by escaped or released domestic ducks, but none near New York. Their native range is East Asia.

The Central Park duck's origin is unknown, but New York is too far from his natural territories for him to have simply gotten lost during migration, which accounts for some other rare sightings. Observers quickly noted a band around its leg suggesting he had been captive. Zoos denied ownership, and the type of band used indicated a private owner from whom he had likely escaped. Nobody stepped forward to claim ownership, perhaps because ducks are illegal to have as pets in the city. Tom Moorman of Ducks Unlimited told the L.A. Times that the duck likely settled in Central Park because it was already a hotspot for other ducks. The New York City Parks Department announced that it would monitor the duck through the 2018–19 winter, and would not try to capture him unless he needed help.

== Disappearance ==
The duck was last seen in Central Park in March 2019, leaving before the species' mating season. Despite false positive sightings and speculation that he would likely return in September, after molting season, he has not been seen as of December 2019. According to Barrett, "Before, even when he ventured to the rivers, our spies found him and posted footage. My best guess was that he flew far enough north to a small pond remote from people."

== Children's book ==
In 2018, entertainer Bette Midler and literary critic Michiko Kakutani discussed the duck at a party, when Kakutani shared pictures she had taken of him. Midler was inspired to write a story about the effect the duck was having on people, causing them to look up from their cell phone screens to look at natural beauty. The book was published as The Tale of the Mandarin Duck in 2021, written by Midler, with photographs by Kakutani and illustrations by Joana Avillez.

== See also ==
- List of individual birds
