= Starr Saphir =

American birder from New York (1939–2013)

Muriel Saphir (1939–2013), known by her nickname Starr Saphir, was an American birder in New York City who led bird walks in Central Park several times a week for nearly 40 years.

== Early life ==
Starr Saphir was born Muriel Theodora Saphir on July 21, 1939. Though she was born on Long Island, she grew up in Brooklyn, and started birding in Prospect Park, regularly traveling from her Bay Ridge home. She cited a black-and-white warbler as her "spark bird", or bird species which triggers a broader interest in birds or birding. She saw it when she was six years old, on the side of the road when her father's car broke down on a trip to her grandparents' house, and recognized it from looking through her grandmother's John James Audubon illustrations. Other than birding, she was also a fan of the Brooklyn Dodgers before they moved to Los Angeles in 1958.

She was a theater major at American University and worked for a time as an actor in Off-Broadway and other productions. She lived in California for a time, pursuing her acting career, and was active in the birding community there.

== Birding ==
Saphir was an avid birder, and offered to lead a walk for the first time in 1975, when a planned Audubon Society walk did not have a leader. She discovered that she liked teaching and wound up leading them regularly, usually four times per week in Central Park, for almost 40 years. Walk participants paid a small fee, which started at $3 and eventually rose to $8. Saphir called the park her "office", but was determined to keep costs low and barely made enough to eke by. Her walks could attract more than 20 people, including repeat patrons, at least one of whom regularly attended for more than 20 years. She would guide people, holding binoculars and wearing a trademark blue bandana, through the Ramble and North Woods sections of the park on outings that could last five hours. She was interested in keeping track of lists and numbers, and would often aim for specific numbers of species on her walks, extending their length or deciding to end in order to leave with a round number. People on her walks were expected to keep to ethical birding best practices intended to minimize disturbances to the birds.

Saphir developed a reputation for her skills with bird identification by sight and by sound, and the Wall Street Journal said she had "seemingly supernatural powers of hearing and sight". Though her specialty was birds, she would also teach about butterflies and dragonflies.

In May 2005, Saphir was a guest on Late Night with Conan O'Brien, featured in a segment in which she introduces O'Brien to birding. Filmmaker Jeffrey Kimball included Saphir as one of the major characters in his 2012 HBO documentary, Birders: The Central Park Effect in 2012. Kimball described her as "the doyenne or the matriarch of the park".

She persisted giving regular bird walks despite a range of health issues, including cataracts, arthritis, a limp, and back problems, and after being diagnosed with metastatic breast cancer.

She did not have a computer and was concerned that the introduction of technology to the pastime would make it inaccessible for some. She did come to use a cell phone to share sightings while out in the park, but otherwise used notebooks to track her sightings. She left 80 such books when she died, tallying 259 different species just in Central Park. Her "life list", a tally of all birds a person has seen at any location, totaled 2,582. Her favorite was the cerulean warbler.

== Personal life and death ==
Saphir was married twice, first to Michael Henisse and later to Stephen Gussman, from whom she was separated when she died, and she had two daughters, Shawna Leigh and Lara Willis. In 2002, she was diagnosed with breast cancer and told it would be terminal, which led her to turn to birding and the walks even more. She died of complications due to metastatic breast cancer on February 10, 2013, at the age of 73.

The Linnaean Society of New York's March/April 2013 newsletter was a collection of memorials to Saphir from several people in the birding community.
