= Gabriel Willow =

American ecologist (born 1978)

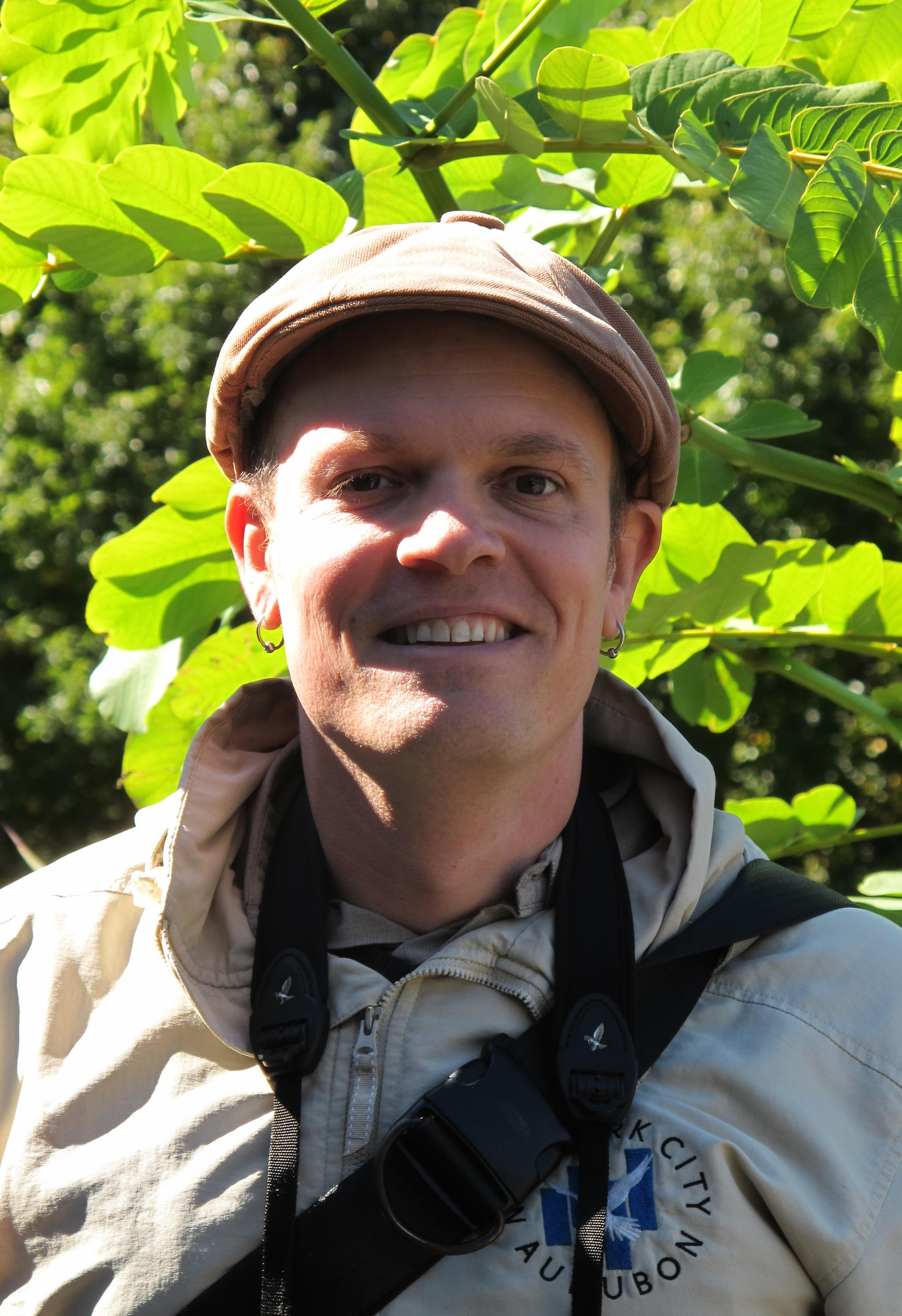
- Gabriel Willow at Wave Hill, the Bronx, New York City, on October 12, 2014
- Born: 1978 (age 47–48); Short Mountain, Tennessee
- Known for: Human ecology, Urban wildlife tours
- Scientific career
- Fields: Environmentalism, Natural History, Ornithology

Gabriel Willow is an environmental educator, an ecologist, and an urban naturalist who lives and works in New York City. In particular Willow is known for his birding tours and city wildlife (or city "wilderness") tours, which he has led since 1999, through the parks, gardens, and waterways of New York City. As an educator he is a self-described "storyteller".

== Maine ==
Willow grew up from the age of five in Montville, Maine. He majored in human ecology at the College of the Atlantic.

== New York City ==
In his role as an environmental educator, Willow has been leading city nature tours since 1999. He has led wildlife tours and classes for New York City Audubon, the New York Botanical Garden, and for Wave Hill. The New York Times explained, "He gave nature tours for the Audubon Society and illustrated seed catalogs; he helped create a groundbreaking citizen science app called The WildLab; nights he worked as a D.J."

=== Human ecology and ornithology ===
In February 2006, National Public Radio, in an episode of All Things Considered, aired an "audio postcard" from a New York City Audubon Society winter bird-watching eco-cruise in New York Harbor. Willow was the guide, and the birds seen included red-breasted mergansers.

In July 2011, one of Willow's tours of the East River was described by him as the "Brothers Grimm of bird tours", during which "...we'll see herons and egrets returning to roost on abandoned islands". The Times reporter commented about Willow, "In addition to his knowledge of the peregrine falcon’s nesting habits, he has an unusual penchant for limning the history of the rocks and ruins where the birds come to roost. The story of the East River, I soon learn, is one of abandoned quarantine hospitals and fiery shipwrecks, of exploding islands and dirty, dirty water." On that particular tour, the birds sighted included yellow warbler, spotted sandpiper, barn swallows, and great egret.

In May 2014, The New York Times featured a week-long "Q. and A. About Birds in New York City" in which Willow answered readers' questions. However, the Times commented that "Mr. Willow...describes himself less as a birder and more of a storyteller and interpreter of human ecology, which explores the relationship between people and their environments."

== Environmentalism ==
Willow lives in Brooklyn, in an urban collective, which attempts to live sustainably. In 2010, the environmental news and commentary magazine Grist quoted Willow as saying, "Farming isn't for everyone, but we can all be part of an ethical sustainable community."
