= Bronx County Bird Club =

Defunct ornithology club in New York, US

- 1: 978 Woodycrest Ave, 2: Hunts Point Dump, 3: Van Cortlandt Park, 4: Pelham Bay Park, 5: Bronx Park
- Nickname: BCBC
- Formation: November 29, 1924; 101 years ago
- Dissolved: 1978; 48 years ago
- Legal status: Informal club
- Purpose: Birding
- Members: 11

The Bronx County Bird Club (BCBC) was a small informal club of birders based in the Bronx, New York, active between 1924 and 1956, with residual activity through 1978. The club was a major participant in the Audubon Society's Christmas census, observing more species in the eastern US than any other team for three consecutive years. Club members Roger Tory Peterson, Joseph Hickey, Allan Cruickshank, and William Vogt became well-known ornithologists and authors.

== Formation ==
The group's interest in birding began in 1918 when John (Matty) Matuszewski, his older brother Charlie, and Richard Kuerzi began looking for birds at the Hunts Point dump near where they lived, working from a copy of Chester A. Reed's Bird Guide: Land Birds East of the Rockies. Charlie, a member of Boy Scout Troop 149, was working on his bird study merit badge at the time. During this time, Matty, Charlie, and Richard met up with Irving Kassoy, another local birder who frequented the dump and the group started calling themselves the "Hunts Dumpers". It was at the dump that this group encountered naturalist Charles Johnston, who introduced them to the Linnaean Society where they met other Bronx birders. Through the Linneaens, the BCBC members were introduced to Ludlow Griscom, who acted as a mentor to the club.

The BCBC was officially founded on November 29, 1924. Nine teenage boys (John F. Kuerzi and his brother Richard, Joseph Hickey, Allan D. Cruickshank, Frederick J. Ruff, Richard A. Herbert, Irving Kassoy, John E. Matuszewski and Philip Kessler) met in the attic of the Kuerzis' home at 978 Woodycrest Ave in the Highbridge section of the Bronx, where they elected John Kuerzi to be chairman, and Hickey as secretary. William Vogt became a member later. In about 1927, Roger Tory Peterson joined the club as its eleventh member, the club having waived its unwritten rule that only Bronx residents could join. Peterson, who later wrote A Field Guide to the Birds and contributed to nearly 50 other books, was also the last living member of the club. Ludlow Griscom taught Peterson how to quickly identify birds visually and his 1923 book, Birds of the New York City Region, was depended upon by the club members. Helen G. Cruickshank, wife of Allan, was made an honorary member in either 1937 or 1978. Ernst Mayr was also associated with the club.

Hickey later wrote Guide to Bird Watching and was awarded a Guggenheim fellowship in the field of Organismic Biology & Ecology. Cruickshank wrote several books, including Birds Around New York City. He was a staff member of the National Audubon Society for 37 years and had pictures published in over 175 books. Vogt served as curator of the Jones Beach Sanctuary, editor of Bird-Lore, and eventually as Conservation Chairman of the Pan-American Union. The founders were described by The New York Times Magazine in 2015 as "a group of competitive, iconoclastic young naturalists", and by Chicago Reader in 1987 as "smart-assed teenagers" who "astounded their stuffy elders with the sightings they reported and their ability to defend the accuracy of those sightings". Ernst Mayr described the group as "a somewhat rowdy group of youngsters who were having a wonderful time".

== Locations ==
The members purchased a used Buick which they used to travel to birding locations, with sewer outfalls and garbage dumps as popular destinations. They found, for example, "four snowy owls feeding on rats" at the Hunts Point Dump. The BCBC did not limit itself to observing in the Bronx. In 1931 they were reported to have made several trips to Putnam County. The club members took over 40,000 photographs covering 400 species of birds.

The last BCBC meeting was held in early 1978 at Fort Myers, Florida after it was made known that Kassoy was terminally ill. Club members attended from Florida, New York, Wisconsin, and Antarctica. The meeting lasted three days, and included a field trip to the Darling National Wildlife Refuge. Roger Tory Peterson was elected permanent president and Joseph Hickey permanent secretary.

== Christmas census ==
In 1922, the club participated for the first time in the annual Christmas census run by the Audubon Society, recording 35 species in Pelham Bay, Van Cortlandt, and Bronx parks that year. The BCBC recorded more species each subsequent census; 26 species in 1923, 67 in 1925, 83 in 1926, 87 in 1927 and 93 in 1929. In 1934, the club spotted 97 species, reported to be one more than they had the previous year. By the group's twelfth census in 1935, 107 species were seen. In later years, the Queens County Bird Club were rivals in the competition.

The club introduced a new technique, with teams of two or three assigned to survey specific areas. This proved to be a successful strategy, with the BCBC observing more species in the eastern US than any other team for three consecutive years. The 1935 total of 107 species was the first time any census participant had ever found more than 100. Initially called the Bronx County Christmas Bird Count, the boundary lines were redrawn in 1940 to include lower Westchester County and renamed the Bronx-Westchester Christmas Bird Count. The last BCBC member to participate in a Christmas count was Richard Herbert in 1956.

== Additional reading ==
- Greenfield, George (December 25, 1935). "Wood, Field and Stream". The New York Times. ISSN 0362-4331.
- Kastner, Joseph (April 15, 1979). "Battle of the Bird Books". The New York Times Magazine. p. 16. ISSN 0362-4331.
- Cruickshank, Allan D. (1942). Birds Around New York City: Where and When to Find Them. New York: The American Museum of Natural History.
