= Allan D. Cruickshank =

American ornithologist, author and photographer

Allan Dudley Cruickshank (August 29, 1907 – October 11, 1974) was an American ornithologist and writer. He wrote many books about birds and was the National Audubon Society's official photographer and a staff member for 37 years.

Cruickshank was born in St. Thomas, the Virgin Islands (then under Danish control) on August 29, 1907, but grew up in New York where he began to take part in Christmas Bird Counts from 1922 as part of a group at the Evander Childs High School. He later became a bird educator for the National Audubon, lecturing across the country with slides and films. It has been estimated that his audience may have numbered 2,900,000 people in all. He travelled around the country with his wife Helen taking photographs and also led bird tours in Africa, South America, and Europe. He served as a president of the Linnean Society of New York, received the John Burroughs Medal in 1949 and the Arthur A. Allen Award of Cornell University.

He died from kidney failure in Gainesville, Florida, on October 11, 1974.

== Books ==
Cruickshank wrote:

- Birds Around New York City
- Wings in the Wilderness
- Hunting With the Camera
- Cruickshank's Pocket Guide to Birds
- 1001 Questions about Birds
- Summer Birds of Lincoln County, Maine
