= Zerelda =

Zerelda is a given name. Notable people with the name include:

- Zerelda James (1825–1911), the mother of Frank James and Jesse James
- Zerelda Mimms (1845–1900), the wife and first cousin of Jesse James
- Zerelda G. Wallace (1817–1901), early temperance and women's suffrage leader

== See also ==
- Zelda (given name)
