= Zelda =

Zelda may refer to:

== Places ==
- Zelda, Kentucky, unincorporated community, United States

== People ==
- Zelda (given name), a female given name
- Zelda (poet), an Israeli poet

== Arts and entertainment ==
=== Media ===
- The Legend of Zelda, a video game franchise
  - The Legend of Zelda (video game), the first game in the franchise
  - Zelda (Game & Watch), a 1989 Game & Watch system
- Zelda (band), a Japanese rock band in the 1980s and 1990s
- Zelda (film), a 1993 television movie
- Zelda, a 1970 biography by Nancy Milford about Zelda Fitzgerald

=== Fictional characters ===
- Princess Zelda, the titular character in The Legend of Zelda video game series
- Zelda, in Stephen King's book Pet Sematary and the film adaptation
- Zelda, the main villainess in the British TV series Terrahawks
- Zelda, the main villainess in the 1998 direct-to-video film The Swan Princess: The Mystery of the Enchanted Kingdom
- Zelda, the dog mascot of Nickelodeon Magazine
- Zelda, the pet vulture in the 1964 TV series The Addams Family
- Zelda Cruz, a character in the American web series Zombie College
- Zelda Gilroy, in the 1959–1963 TV series The Many Loves of Dobie Gillis
- Zelda Kay, in the Island at War television mini-series
- Zelda, a previous love interest of Iceman in Marvel Comics
- Zelda Reginhard, in the anime and manga series Lotte no Omocha!
- Zelda Schiff, Head Librarian in the TV series The Magicians
- Zelda Spellman, Sabrina's aunt in Sabrina the Teenage Witch
- Zelda Spooner, in Billy Wilder's 1964 comedy film Kiss Me, Stupid
- "Zelda the Great", an episode and eponymous villain in the 1966 TV series Batman
- Zelda, a loppy occultist who resurrects her sister Lucy in 1987 comedy film Hello Again

== Other uses ==
- Zelda (turkey), the wild turkey resident in Battery Park, Manhattan
- Zelda (זלדה), Israel Defense Forces soldiers' nickname for the M113 Armored Personnel Carrier
- Typhoon Zelda, two tropical cyclones
