= Nordlinger =

Nordlinger or Nördlinger is a surname. Notable people with the surname include:

- Hermann von Nördlinger (1818–1897), German forester, botanist and entomologist
- Jay Nordlinger (born 1963), American journalist
- Joseph Yuspa Nördlinger Hahn (died 1637), German rabbi
- Rachel Nordlinger, Australian linguist and academic
- Zelda Nordlinger (1932–2008), American feminist and women's rights activist
