= Grizel =

Grizel, also spelled Grizell, Grizelle, Grisel and Grisell, is a feminine given name which may refer to:

- Grisell Baillie (1822–1891), first woman deaconess in the Church of Scotland
- Lady Grizel Baillie (1665–1746), Scottish aristocrat and songwriter, whose account ledgers provide information about social life in Scotland in the eighteenth century
- Grizel Baillie, Lady Murray (1692–1759), Scottish memoirist, daughter of the above
- Grizel Cochrane, a figure in 17th century Scottish lore
- Grizelle González, soil ecologist
- Lady Grizel Louise Hamilton (1880–1976), Welsh and Scottish aristocrat and big game hunter
- Grisel Herrera (born 1971), Cuban former basketball player
- Grisel Machado (born 1959), Cuban athlete
- Grisel Mendoza (born 1956), Mexican swimmer
- Grizel Niven (1906–2007), British sculptor
- Grisell Pérez (1983–2021), Mexican human rights activist
- Grizell Steevens (1653–1746), English philanthropist

== See also ==
- Griselda
- French communes:
  - Griselles, Côte-d'Or
  - Griselles, Loiret
- Grisel
- Grisel (surname)
