= Griselda =

- Gender: Female

Origin
- Origin: Germanic
- Meaning: "grey battle-maid"

Other names
- Nicknames: Zelda, Grissy, Selda, Grisel, Grizel
- Related names: Zelda

Griselda, also spelled Grizelda, is a feminine given name from Germanic sources that is now used in English, Italian, and Spanish as well.

The name likely specifically stems from the Proto-Germanic language elements *grīsaz, "grey", and *hildiz, meaning "battle" (compare modern German grau and Held), thus literally "gray battle-maid".

As a figure in European folklore, Griselda is noted for her patience and obedience and has been depicted in works of art, literature and opera.

According to the 1990 United States Census, the name was 1,066th in popularity among females in the United States.

The name can also be spelled "Griselde", "Grisselda", "Grieselda", "Grizelda", "Gricelda", and "Criselda".

Common nicknames include "Zelda", "Selda", "Grissy", "Gris", "Grisel", "Grizel" or "Crisel"

People named Griselda or Grizelda include:

- Griselda Álvarez (1913–2009), first female governor in Mexico
- Griselda Báthory (1569–1590), Hungarian and Polish noblewoman
- Griselda Blanco (1943–2012), a former Medellín Cartel drug lord
- Grizelda Cjiekella (died 2015), South African politician
- Griselda Delgado del Carpio (born 1955), Bolivian bishop
- Griselda El Tayib (1925–2022), British-born visual artist and cultural anthropologist
- Griselda Gambaro (1928–2026), Argentine writer
- Griselda González (born 1965), Argentine former long-distance runner
- Griselda Hinojosa (1875–1959), first female pharmacist in Chile
- Grizelda Kristiņa (1910–2013), last native speaker of the Livonian language
- Griselda Pascual (1926–2001), Spanish Catalan mathematician
- Griselda Pollock (born 1949), British art historian, cultural analyst and scholar
- Griselda Steevens (1653–1746), Irish philanthropist and benefactor of Dr Steevens' Hospital in Dublin
- Griselda Tessio (born 1947), vice-governor of the Argentine province of Santa Fe
- Grizelda Elizabeth Cottnam Tonge (1803–1825), Nova Scotian poet
