= Astoria (turkey) =

Wild turkey in New York City since 2024

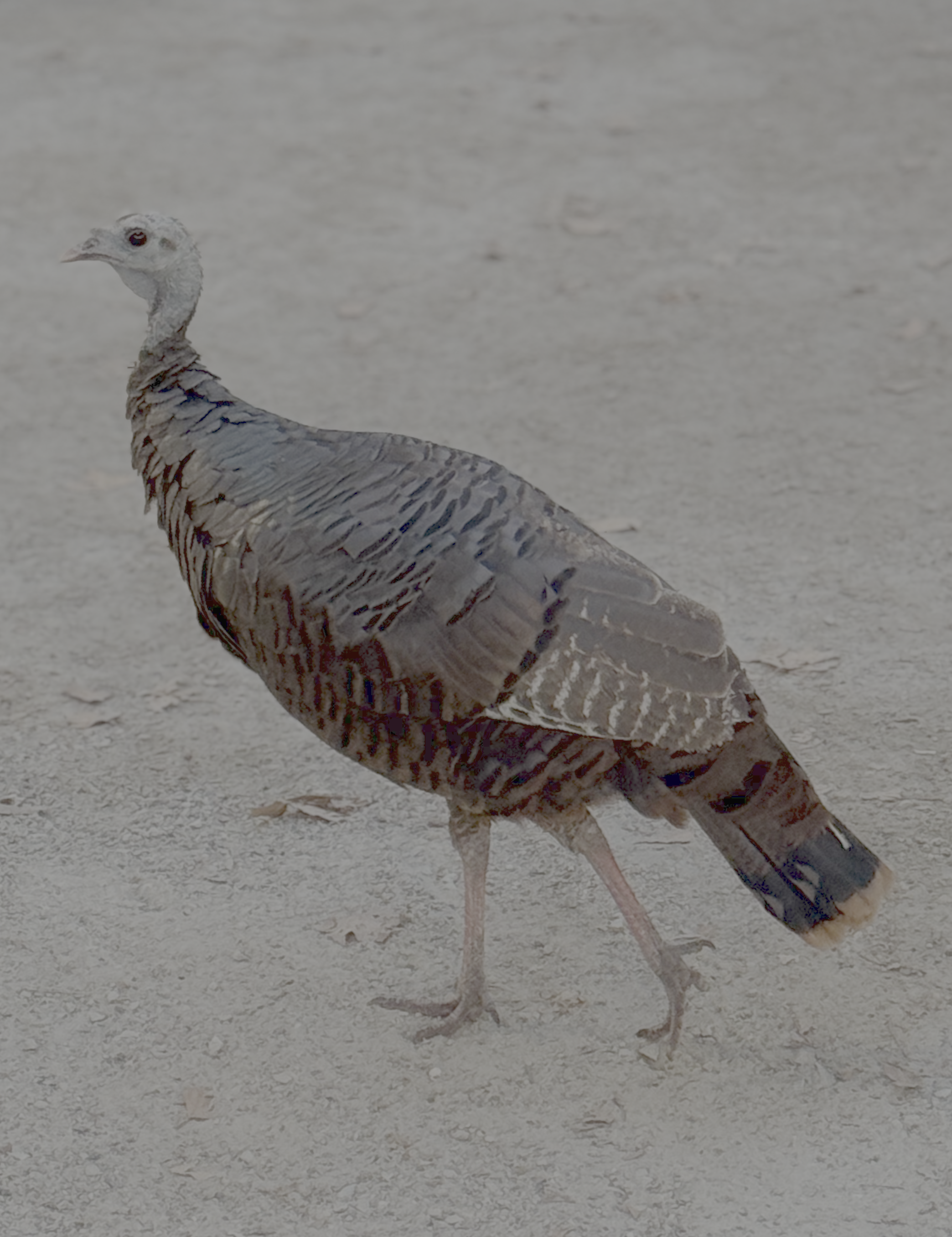
- Astoria in September 2025
- Other name: Rosie
- Species: Wild turkey
- Sex: Female
- Years active: 2024–present
- Residence: New York City

Astoria, also known as Rosie, is a female wild turkey who has resided in New York City since 2024.

== Attributes and behavior ==
Astoria is roughly the height of a human toddler, with "iridescent hues of orange and blue in her brown feathers, an elegant neck, a healthy figure and wings that have helicopter-like strength".

Witnesses have suggested Astoria enjoys the sight of her own reflection. Like most turkeys, she roosts in trees at night.

== Residence in New York ==
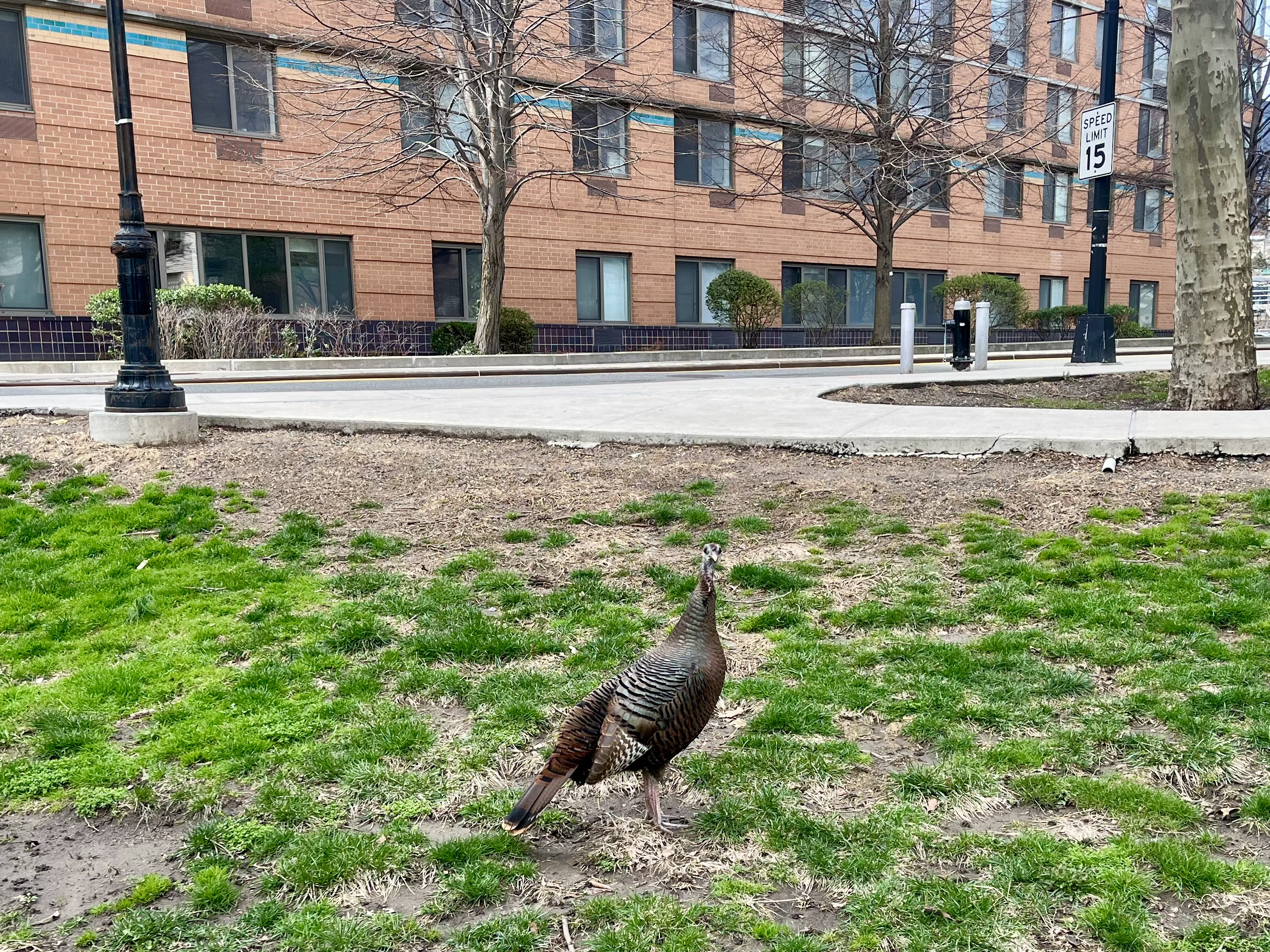
Astoria on Roosevelt Island in April 2025, prior to relocating to Manhattan Island

Astoria arrived at a Long Island City community garden in the New York borough of Queens in April 2024, then moved to Midtown Manhattan later that month, likely by flying over the East River. She generally spent time within the vicinity of 49th Street and Park Avenue, foraging in planters and eating blueberries offered by the staff of the restaurant Fasano. She decamped to Roosevelt Island the following month, thought to be a source of "relative quiet", although local children were occasionally reported harassing her with water pistols and small stones. Over the following year, she roamed the length of the island, exploring Franklin D. Roosevelt Four Freedoms Park and Lighthouse Park.

Astoria returned to Manhattan in April 2025. She appeared to be exhibiting mating behavior, such as expanding her range and calling, an effort one expert dubbed "impossible" due to the lack of male turkeys on the island. That month, the New York City Police Department attempted to capture her and she flew off. She has been spotted on the Upper East Side, in The Ramble at Central Park, and in the Battery, where locals feed her with worms. By late 2025 and early 2026, Astoria had settled around the Battery.

== Reception ==
In its April 2025 "approval matrix", the magazine New York classified Astoria's migration from Roosevelt Island to Manhattan as "brilliant" and "lowbrow". Some locals have referred to Astoria as Rosie, after her extended residence on Roosevelt Island.

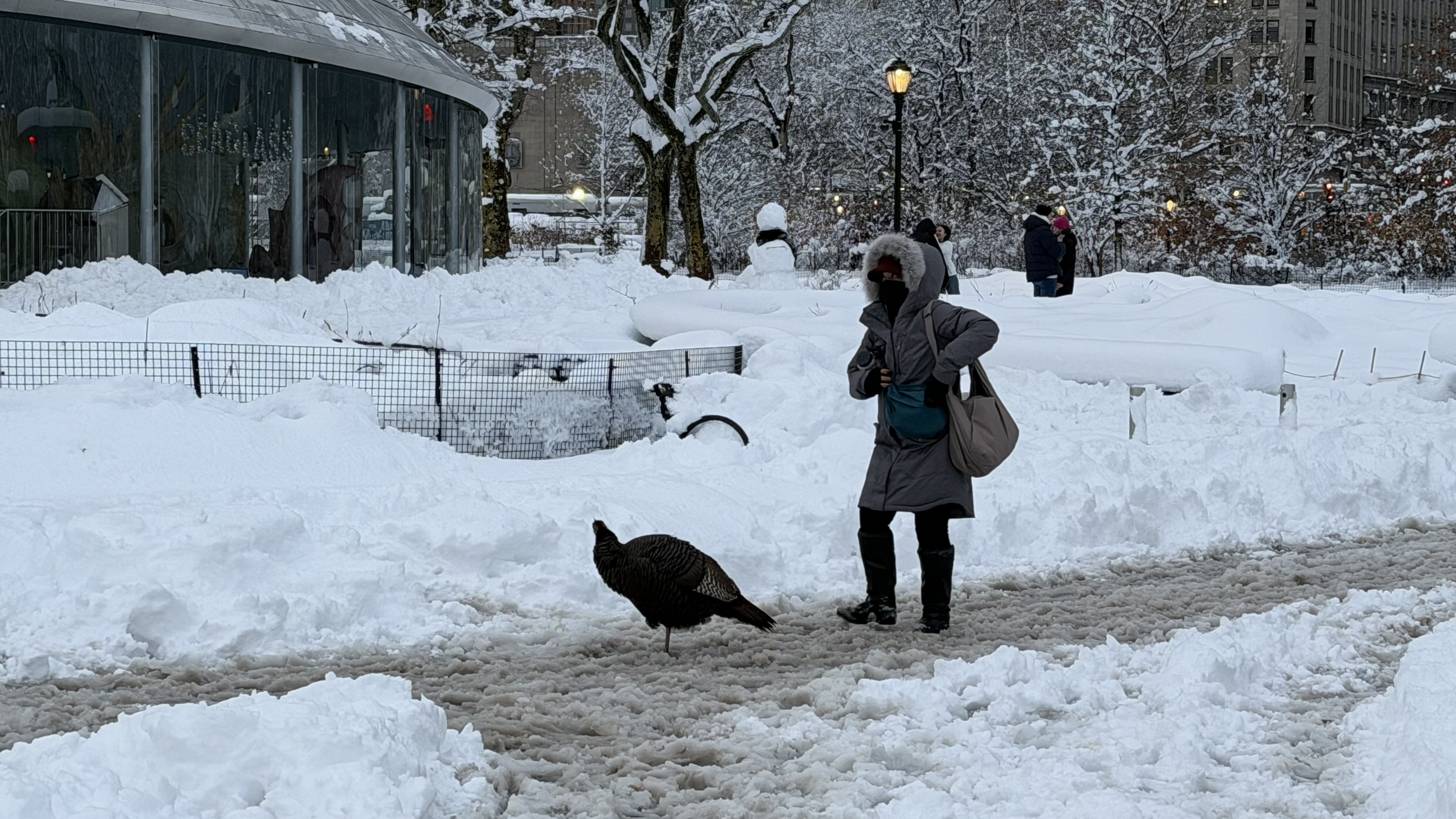
Astoria walking with a woman in the Battery after the February 2026 North American blizzard.

After New Yorkers called the police on Astoria several times during her time in Manhattan, avian advocates urged residents to refrain from doing so, explaining attempts to capture her could put her in danger. Astoria gained several devoted fans who interacted with her in Battery Park. The New York Times' Dodai Stewart reported in February 2026 that Astoria had "fairy godmothers [who] watch over her every waking hour".

Astoria has been compared to Zelda, a turkey who resided in The Battery from 2003 to 2014. She joins a group of other New York City celebrity birds, including Flaco, a Eurasian eagle-owl who was freed from the Central Park Zoo and roamed free in Manhattan before colliding with a building under the influence of rodenticide, and the Central Park mandarin duck.
