= The Battery (Manhattan) =

Public park in Manhattan, New York

- Battery Park
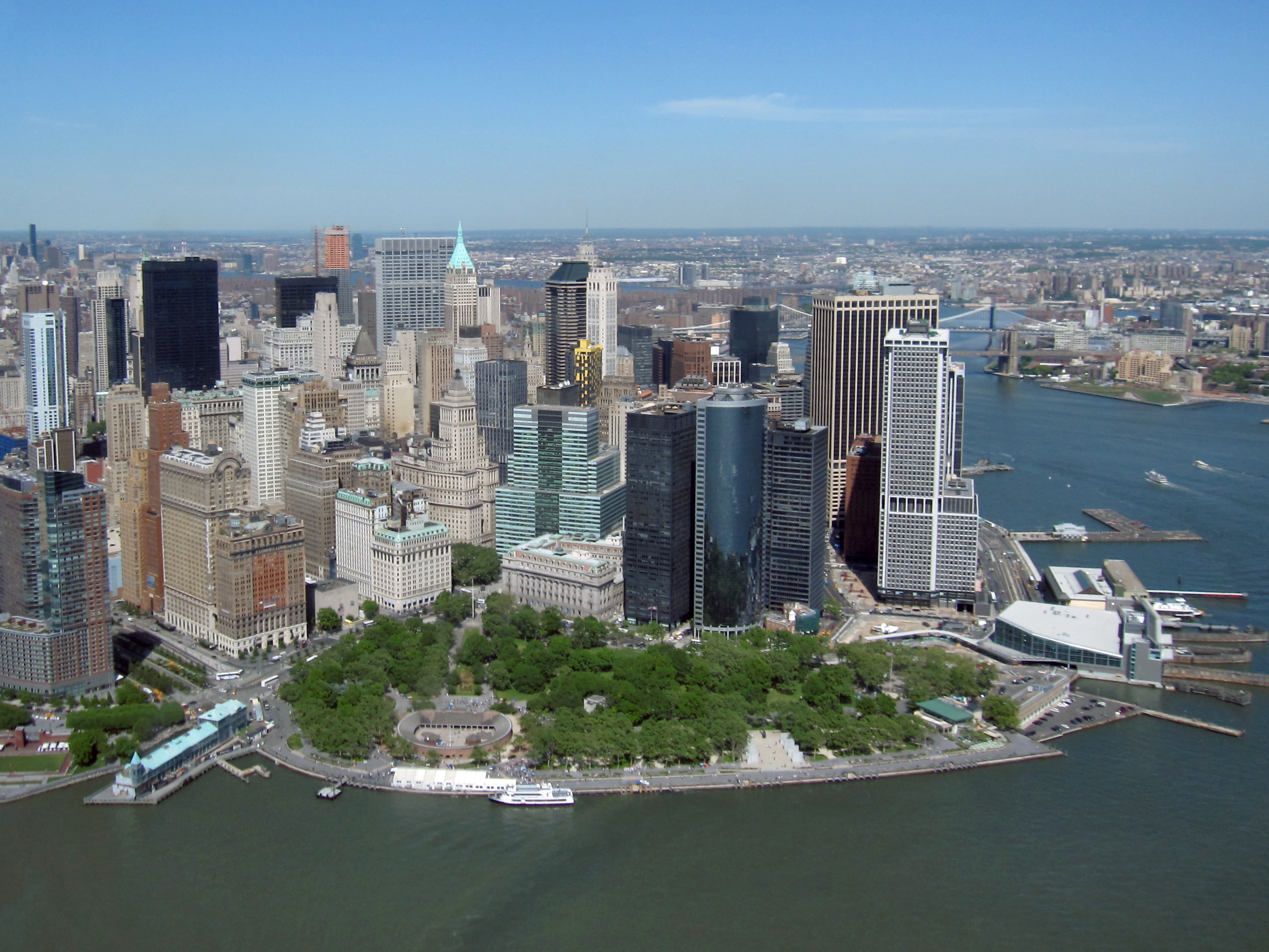
- Aerial view of the Battery in 2010. At park's left is Pier A, at park's right is South Ferry Terminal. On the far right is the East River.
- Interactive map of The Battery
- Location: Southern end of Lower Manhattan in New York City; bounded by New York Harbor to the south
- Coordinates: 40°42′13″N 74°00′58″W
- Area: 25 acres (10 ha)
- Created: 1823
- Etymology: Artillery battery
- Owner: New York City Department of Parks and Recreation
- Operator: The Battery Conservancy
- Open: 6 a.m. to 1 a.m.
- Public transit: Bus: M15 SBS, M20 and M55; Subway: at South Ferry/Whitehall Street at Bowling Green
- Website: NYC Parks; The Battery Conservancy

The Battery, formerly known as Battery Park, is a 25-acre (10 ha) public park located at the southern tip of Manhattan Island in New York City facing New York Harbor. The park is bounded by Battery Place on the north, with Bowling Green to the northeast, State Street on the east, New York Harbor to the south, and the Hudson River to the west. The park contains attractions such as an early 19th-century fort named Castle Clinton; multiple monuments; and the SeaGlass Carousel. The surrounding area, known as South Ferry, contains multiple ferry terminals, including the Staten Island Ferry's Whitehall Terminal; a boat launch to the Statue of Liberty National Monument (which includes Ellis Island and Liberty Island); and a boat launch to Governors Island.

The park and surrounding area are named for the artillery batteries that were built in the late 17th century to protect the fort and settlement behind them. By the 1820s, the Battery had become an entertainment destination and promenade, with the conversion of Castle Clinton into a theater venue. During the mid-19th century, the modern-day Battery Park was laid out and Castle Clinton was converted into an immigration and customs center. The Battery was commonly known as the landing point for immigrants arriving in New York City until 1892, when the immigration center was relocated to Ellis Island in the middle of the harbor. Castle Clinton (sometimes called Castle Garden) then hosted the New York Aquarium from 1896 to 1941.

By the 20th century, the quality of Battery Park had started to decline, and several new structures were proposed within the park, many of which were not built. In 1940, the entirety of Battery Park was closed for twelve years due to the construction of the Brooklyn–Battery Tunnel and the Battery Park Underpass. The park reopened in 1952 after a renovation, but then subsequently went into decline. The Battery Conservancy, founded in 1994 by Warrie Price, underwrote and funded the restoration and improvement of the once-dilapidated park. In 2015, the Conservancy restored the park's historical name, "the Battery".

== History ==
=== Site ===
The area was originally occupied by the Lenape Native Americans. Dutch settlers populated the area as part of the settlement of New Amsterdam in the early 17th century. The Dutch referred to the southern tip of Manhattan as "Capske Hook" or "Capsie Hoek", the term coming from the Lenape word "Kapsee", meaning "rocky ledge". Capske Hook was originally a narrow, hilly ledge that extended northward to Broadway, which at the time was a Lenape trail. Schreyers Hook (cf. Amsterdam's Schreierstoren) was just adjacent. In 1625–1626, the Dutch built Fort Amsterdam atop of a hill at the site of the present Alexander Hamilton U.S. Custom House. However, the fort was largely ineffective, despite several attempts at reconstruction.

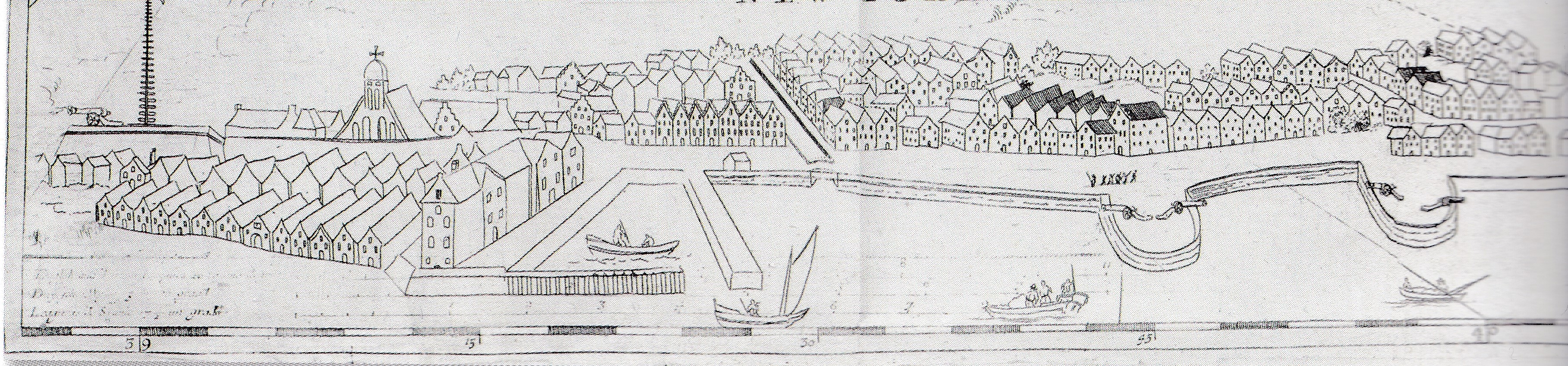
Plan of The Battery (Manhattan) in 1677

The English took over the settlement in 1664 and renamed the defenses Fort James. An artillery battery was installed at the fort in 1683 by Governor Thomas Dongan, the first of a series of batteries put in around King William's War, which gave the area its name. Other batteries were installed at Whitehall and at Oyster Pasty; the English sometimes used the same name to refer to all of these batteries. Fort Amsterdam would be renamed several times before the British settled on the name of "Fort George" by 1714.

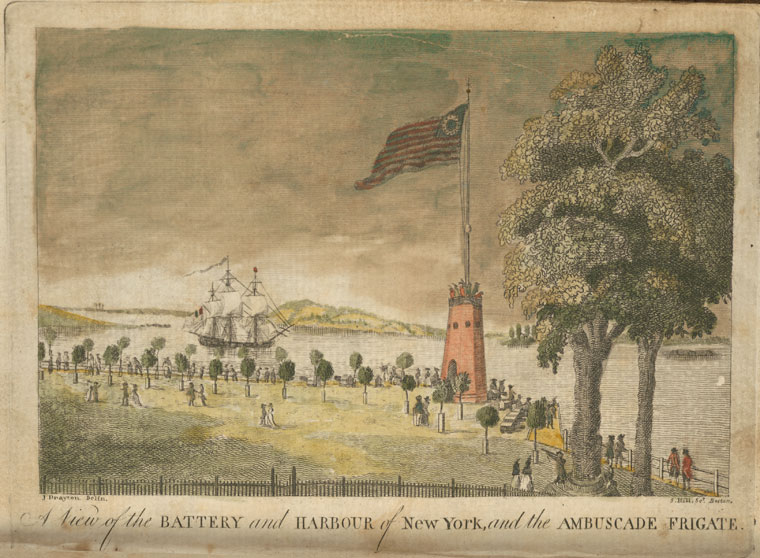
1793 rendering of the flagpole and recent plantings at the Battery

The Battery did not fire any additional shots until 1776, during the New York and New Jersey campaign of the American Revolutionary War, when American troops commandeered the fort and fired on British ships in an unsuccessful attempt to prevent them from sailing up the Hudson River. Following the British landing at Kip's Bay on September 15, 1776, the Americans had abandoned the fort, and the British took Lower Manhattan. At the end of the war in 1783, the Battery was the center of Evacuation Day celebrations commemorating the departure of the last British troops in the United States; the event was later commemorated with the erection of a flagstaff. (Note: The Battery Flagstaff, built on newly reclaimed land on the Battery, was replaced in 1809 and demolished about 1825. In 1809, the new flagstaff further east on the Battery with a decorative gazebo, which was operated as a concession. In August 1863, the Battery Flagstaff was destroyed by a lightning strike; it was subsequently replaced.) By 1788, Fort George had been demolished, and debris from the fort was used to expand the Battery. The fort itself became the site of Government House, an executive mansion intended for U.S. president George Washington, though never actually used for that purpose.

In 1808–1811, just prior to the War of 1812, the West Battery was erected on a small artificial offshore island nearby, to replace the earlier batteries in the area. At the time, the shore at the Battery was a relatively flat edge. The West Battery was never used, and following the war, the artillery battery was renamed Castle Clinton. When Battery Park's landmass was created, it encircled and incorporated the island. About 3 acres (1.2 ha) were added to the park area in 1824. Meanwhile, Castle Clinton was turned over to the city government, which turned the structure into an entertainment venue. It subsequently served various purposes, including as an immigration and customs center as well as an aquarium.

=== Creation ===
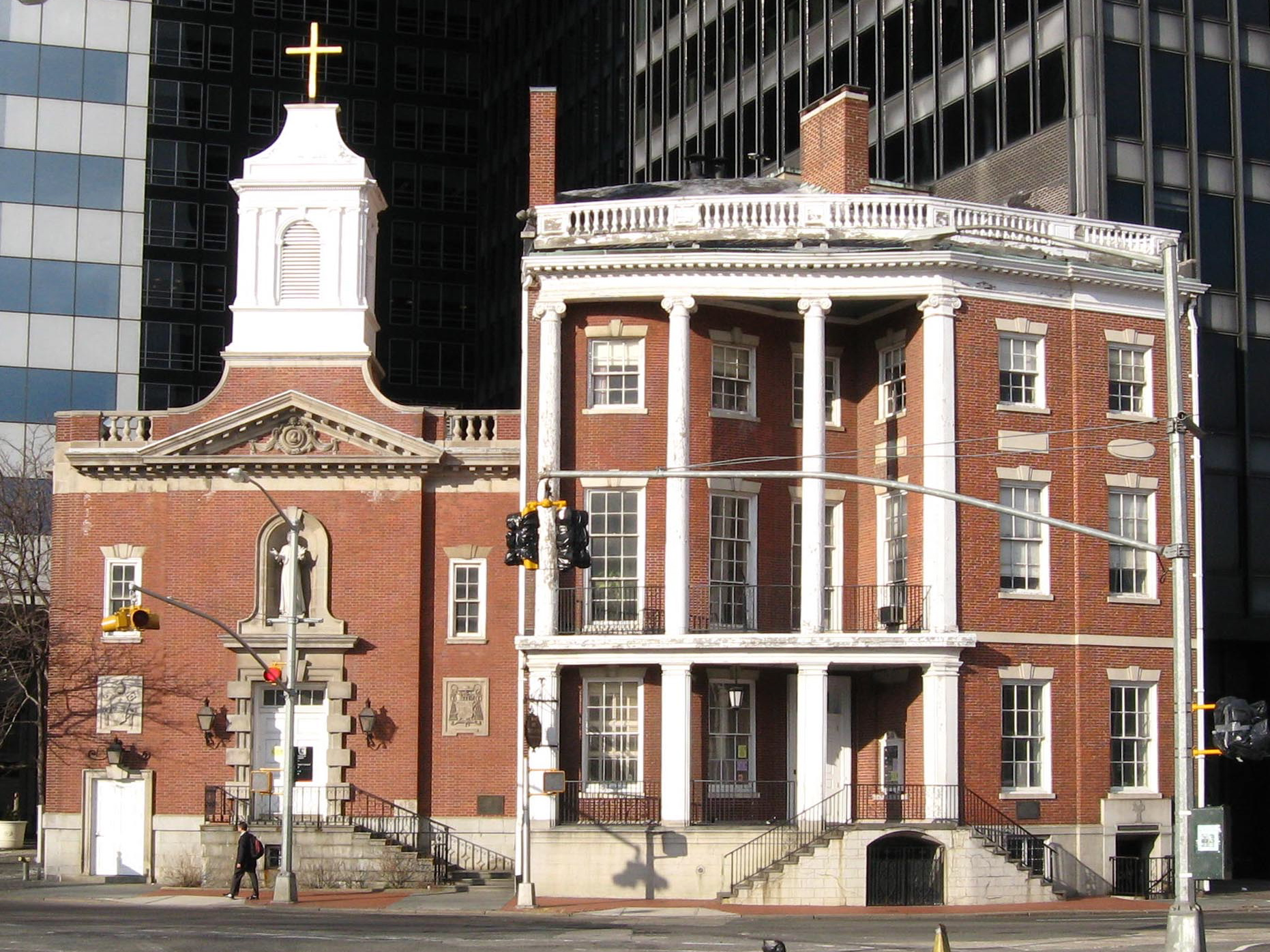
The James Watson House, 1793–1806, attributed to John McComb Jr., and adjoining shrine to St. Elizabeth Ann Seton face Battery Park

By the 1840s, members of the city's elite were publicly calling for the construction of a new large park in Manhattan. Proponents said that the park would serve three purposes: abetting good health, improving the behavior of the "disorderly classes", and showcasing the refinement of the city's elite. At the time, Manhattan's seventeen squares comprised a combined 165 acres (67 ha) of land, the largest of which was the 10-acre (4.0 ha) park at the Battery. Two sites were considered for a large park: Jones's Wood, and the present site of Central Park. An alternate suggestion was to enlarge the existing Battery Park, a move endorsed by most of the public. However, the expansion of Battery Park was opposed by wealthy merchants who deemed the proposed enlargement to be dangerous to maritime traffic, and they obtained the opinion of a United States Navy lieutenant who agreed with them. As a compromise, New York City's aldermen also voted to expand Battery Park to 24 acres (9.7 ha). Ultimately, the plans for the large park would result in the construction of Central Park.

The relatively modern Battery Park was mostly created by landfill as part of Lower Manhattan expansion starting from 1855, using earth from street-widening projects in Lower Manhattan which united Castle Garden's island with the "mainland" of Manhattan. The original shoreline is roughly the modern-day park's eastern boundary at State Street. On State Street, the former harbor front and the northern boundary of the park, a single Federal mansion, the James Watson House, survives as part of the Shrine of Saint Elizabeth Ann Seton.

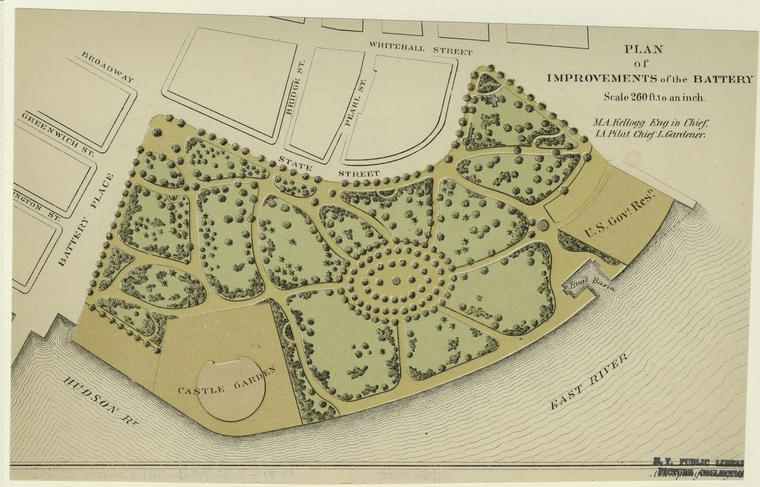
Map of the Battery, 1871

By 1870, there were plans to improve Battery Park and Bowling Green, which were seen as having degraded substantially due to overuse. Paths were to be laid through both parks, intersecting with a plaza to be built outside Castle Clinton. City Pier A, located immediately north of Castle Clinton, was commissioned in 1886 and completed two years after. The building originally housed the New York City Board of Dock Commissioners and subsequently was used as a fireboat station until 1992.

==== Elevated and subway lines ====
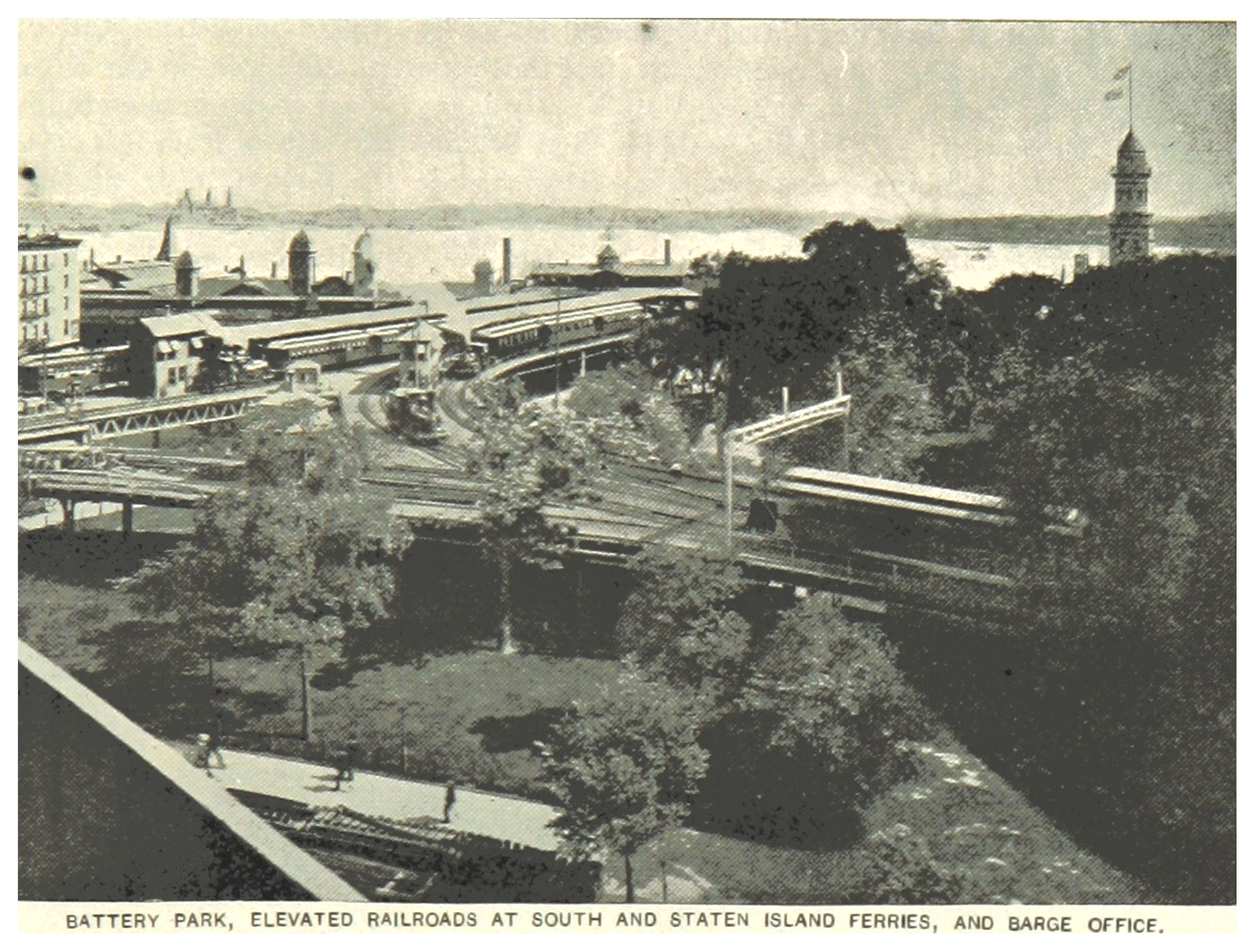
Battery Place station foreground right; South Ferry station left

Several elevated railroad lines or "els" were being built to Battery Park by the late 19th century, but they were controversial for several reasons. Because the els were originally pulled by steam trains until 1902, this caused substantial pollution at Battery Park. The New York Elevated Railroad Company opened the Battery Place elevated station at Battery Place, on the park's northern end, in 1872. This was followed by the opening of the two-track South Ferry elevated station at the park's southern end in 1877. New York Elevated Railroad agreed to beautify Battery Park as a condition of being allowed to construct the station, but the elevated station's construction soon prompted opposition among people who wanted the elevated tracks removed.

A larger four-track station was built nearby in 1879, serving the Second, Third, Sixth, and Ninth Avenue Lines. In 1883, the state legislature established a committee to examine the process through which permission had been granted to construct the elevated station. The following year, New York Elevated proposed to extend the platforms of the Battery Place station over Battery Park because the platforms were too short to accommodate four-car trains. Another plan, which would have created elevated track loops over Battery Park, was rejected in 1887 as being unlawful. Other unsuccessful plans to build elevated tracks over Battery Park were proposed in 1889 and 1891.

By 1900, the els were considered a nuisance, and there were calls to destroy the segments of elevated tracks that ran directly over the park, though this did not come to pass for another fifty years. In 1903, a state assemblyman proposed a bill that would give the elevated railroad companies the exclusive rights to build a rail terminal at Battery Park, precluding the construction of the Interborough Rapid Transit Company (IRT)'s underground subway. The bill was not passed. By that time, the IRT Lexington Avenue Line, the Joralemon Street Tunnel to Brooklyn, and the South Ferry subway terminal were being built directly under the park. The South Ferry station opened in 1905, while the Joralemon Street Tunnel opened in 1908.

Another early method of transportation was by streetcars, which stopped at Battery Place and traveled up both sides of Manhattan Island. These streetcar lines terminated at South Ferry and included what are now the M7, M20, M55 and M103 bus routes. (Note: Respectively, the M7, M20, M55, and M103 were the streetcar lines running on Columbus Avenue/Broadway, Eighth Avenue, Riverside Drive/Broadway, and Third Avenue/Lexington Avenue.) The streetcars were eliminated by 1936, though only some were replaced by buses.

=== 20th century ===
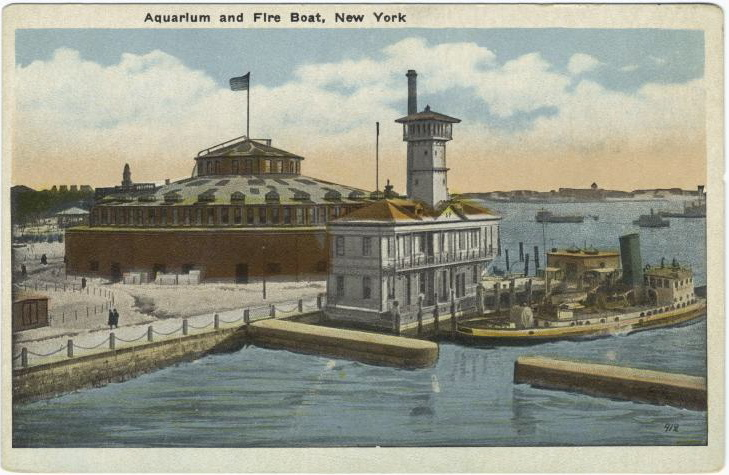
The New York Aquarium used to be housed in Castle Clinton (image before 1923)

By the 20th century, the quality of Battery Park had started to decline, and several new structures were being proposed within the park itself, though most plans faced opposition and were not built. For instance, in 1901, a large memorial arch to honor United States Navy sailors was proposed within the park. Another monument, to steamboat operator Robert Fulton, was proposed in September 1905 by Gustav H. Schwab. There was also a bill to construct a playground in the park, which was vetoed in 1903. Opposition to structures in Battery Park was such that even the construction of the IRT subway under Battery Park was opposed by the Manhattan parks commissioner. Other proposals included a 1910 plan to expand the Aquarium within Battery Park and a proposal for an athletic jogging field the following year. Furthermore, during World War I, there was a plan to construct a federal government building on the site, but this was withdrawn after the U.S. government found new premises following opposition to the project.

Proposals to redesign Battery Park continued through the next decade. An expansion of the New York Aquarium within the park was announced in 1921, and a new memorial plaque was unveiled the same year. By 1926, a group called the Battery Park Association had formed a committee to study ways to improve the park. In 1928, it was proposed to remove the els from Battery Park. The following year, an immigrants' memorial was proposed within Battery Park, and the park itself was proposed for reconstruction into a formal vista. In 1937, Isaac Newton Phelps Stokes proposed making Battery Park into a landscaped "front door" for New York City, with a semicircular seawall and a curving plaza. Officials announced a proposal the following year to expand the park by 9 acres (3.6 ha) in conjunction with improvements to roads around the park.

In 1940, Battery Park was partially closed for the construction of the Brooklyn–Battery Tunnel, and the aquarium was shuttered. Subsequently, several plans to modify Battery Park were proposed. A design competition to rebuild Battery Park was hosted in 1941, and a plan to replace Castle Clinton with a Fort Clinton memorial was also discussed. During the park's closure, its northern end was used to store debris. A second tunnel, the Battery Park Underpass, started construction in 1949. The following year, the Brooklyn-Battery Tunnel opened, and the South Ferry elevated station was removed after the closure of the last elevated line leading to the station. After the underpass was completed in 1951, the park was re-landscaped and expanded by 2 acres (0.81 ha), and it reopened on July 15, 1952. In Battery Park's new layout, it contained a landscaped esplanade, a raised waterfront terrace, and an oval lawn with a playground. Various statues, formerly scattered across the park, were rearranged in patterns. The reconstruction of Battery Park had cost roughly $2.38 million.

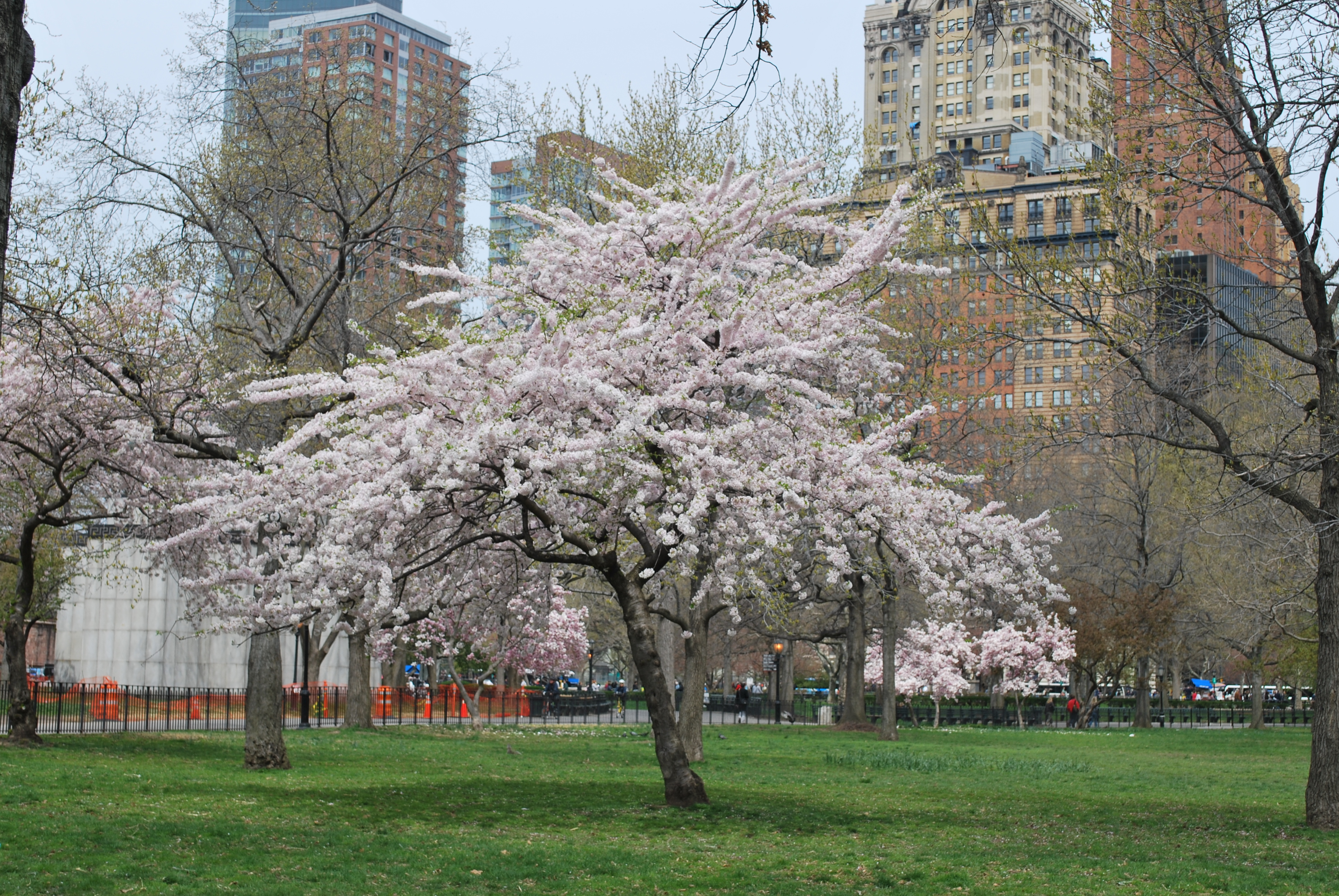
A tree in Battery Park

Several memorials opened through the mid-20th century. Peter Minuit Plaza and a Coast Guard memorial were both dedicated in 1955, and the East Coast Memorial was dedicated in 1963. Additionally, a 2,500-foot-tall (760 m) "space needle" with office and commercial space, twice the height of the Empire State Building, was proposed for the Battery in the 1960s, while discussions were ongoing on where to put the additional earth created from the construction of the World Trade Center. The building would have been placed partially on landfill adjacent to the Battery. The "needle" was never built, and the earth was used as landfill for the creation of Battery Park City, just to the north of Battery Park. By 1971, Battery Park was so dilapidated that a U.S. representative from Missouri, Richard Howard Ichord Jr., called the litter-ridden park "a national disgrace" and proposed that two National Park Service employees be hired to clean up the park. Castle Clinton was restored several years later, and reopened in 1975.

In 1982, Battery Park and multiple other "historic waterfront sites" were designated by the government of New York State as part of a zone called "Harbor Park". The other sites included South Street Seaport in Manhattan, Liberty and Ellis Islands in New York Harbor, Fulton Ferry in Brooklyn, and Sailors' Snug Harbor in Staten Island, which were to be linked by new ferry routes. The Harbor Park legislation was part of a city proposal to create a larger tourist destination out of these sites, focused chiefly around New York Harbor's history. The "park" was opened in July 1984.

=== Restoration and 21st century ===
==== 1970s to 1990s ====
Battery Park City was constructed as a luxury waterfront neighborhood through the 1970s and 1980s. The success of the development resulted in attention and new funding for Battery Park projects, such as $5 million for a garden near Castle Clinton. In 1988, governor Mario Cuomo and mayor Ed Koch announced a $100 million plan to construct two new parks in Battery Park City and rearrange the park at the Battery as part of a new Hudson River waterfront park system. Part of the waterfront park system had been completed previously, but the new proposal would complete the system of parks. Within Battery Park, the Battery Park City Authority would add new entrances and redesign the park to give clearer views of the Hudson River.

However, by the 1990s, Battery Park was worn down, and many of the nearby residents and tourists shunned it altogether, except when taking boats to the Statue of Liberty and Ellis Island. The New York Times said of the park, "Some benches are broken, all need repainting. Where grass should be, there is dirt and litter. A sign with a map and guide is so smeared with graffiti it is unreadable. There are potholes on the asphalt where people line up for boats to the Statue of Liberty." The nonprofit Battery Conservancy was created in 1994, and one of its first actions was to create an architectural plan for the park, and renovating it for $30 million. In 1998, the administration of mayor Rudy Giuliani announced a $40 million initiative to renovate Battery Park. The restoration project, based on similar successful projects at Bryant and Central Parks, called for the relocation of the Battery's 23 statues, as well as an expansion of Castle Clinton. Much of the funding was to be raised privately, and at the time, this was thought to be a minor obstacle since Battery Park was neither as high-profile as Central Park, nor as worn-down as Bryant Park.

==== 2000s to present ====
One of the first renovation projects to commence was the reconstruction of the park's seawall and promenade at a cost of $5.5 million. Although Battery Park was used as an emergency staging site following the September 11 attacks in 2001, construction on the upper promenade continued largely uninterrupted, and it opened in December 2001. Five months after being damaged in the September 11 attacks, Fritz Koenig's The Sphere, which once stood at the center of the plaza of the World Trade Center a few blocks away, was reinstalled in a temporary location in the northern section of the park. It was located near the Netherland Monument in the northeast corner of the park before being moved to Liberty Park in the new World Trade Center in late 2017. The Battery Bosque, a new landscaped garden, opened in 2005.

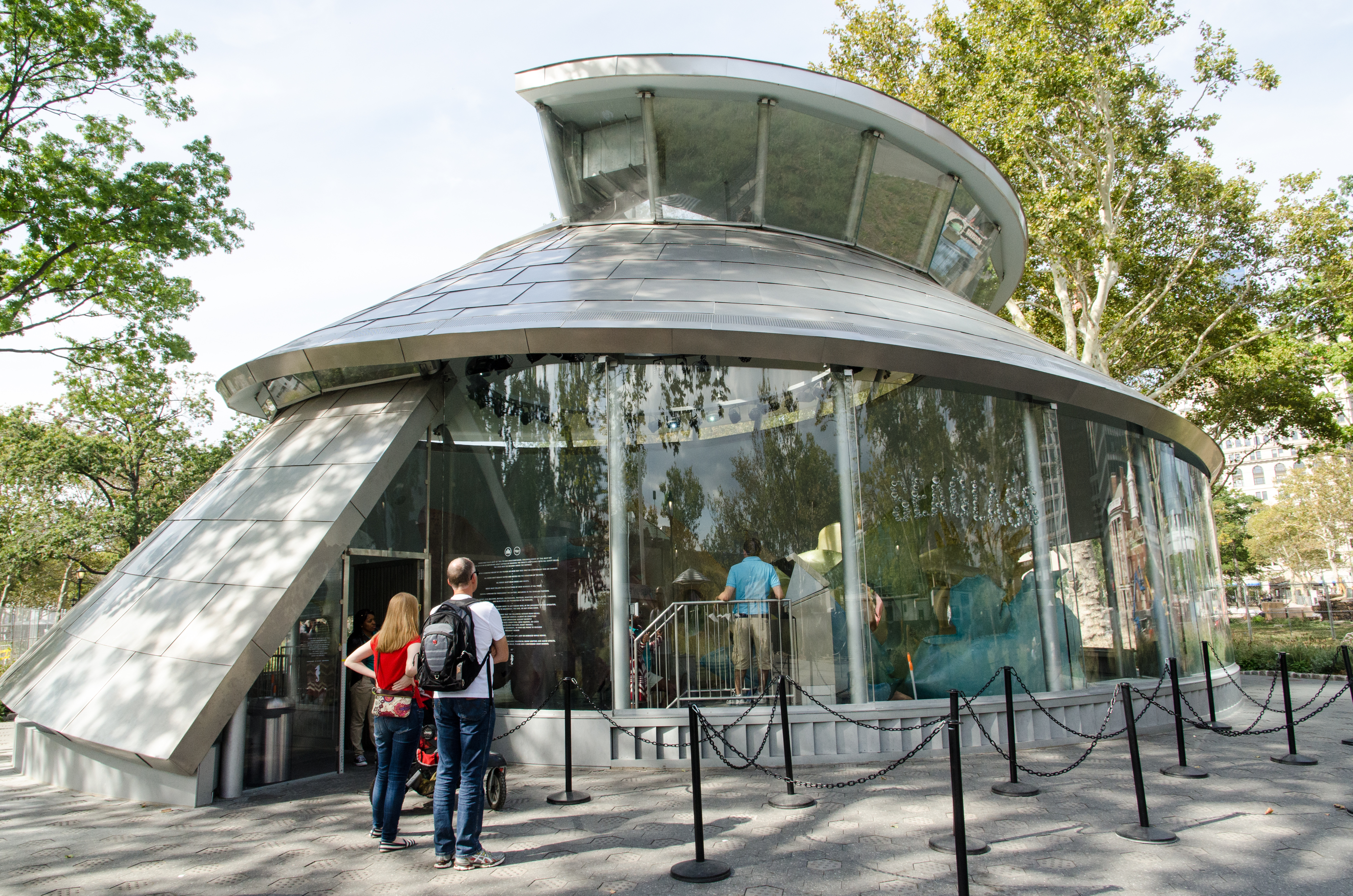
SeaGlass Carousel, opened 2015

Some restoration projects were undertaken in Battery Park in the 2010s, including the addition of a community garden, the renovation of a promenade, and the construction of the SeaGlass Carousel. By June 2012, a third of the park was being cordoned off for these construction projects, though the park itself remained open, serving 10,000 to 15,000 daily visitors. In October of that year, Hurricane Sandy caused severe damage to the area, submerging the park under salt water for several hours. the Battery Conservancy restored the wooded areas within Battery Park, as well as added gardens and green patches to mitigate the effects of future storms. Though the SeaGlass Carousel was left largely intact during Hurricane Sandy, its opening was delayed. Following the storm, the attraction was supposed to open in late 2013, but did not actually open until August 2015.

The New York City Department of Parks and Recreation restored the park's original, historical title of "The Battery" in 2015. By the following year, the Battery Conservancy had raised $46 million in private funding over its 22-year existence, as well as $92 million in city funding. The conservancy planned to use these funds to make additional improvements to the park. For instance, the Battery Oval was opened in 2016. A 1.4-acre (0.57 ha) environmentally-friendly, flood-resistant playground called the Playscape was proposed in 2016. Work began in March 2020, and the Playscape was completed in December 2021. In addition, as part of the Lower Manhattan Coastal Resiliency program, consulting firm Stantec published designs in 2021 for the Battery Coastal Resilience Project, which would build a seawall around Battery Park. The project. which was expected to cost $169 million by the end of 2023, would raise the shoreline by up to 5 feet (1.5 m) to protect the park from sea level rise. Work on the seawall began in early 2024, with a groundbreaking ceremony taking place that May. The project's first phase was completed in June 2026, and a second phase was to continue through 2027.

== Notable attractions ==
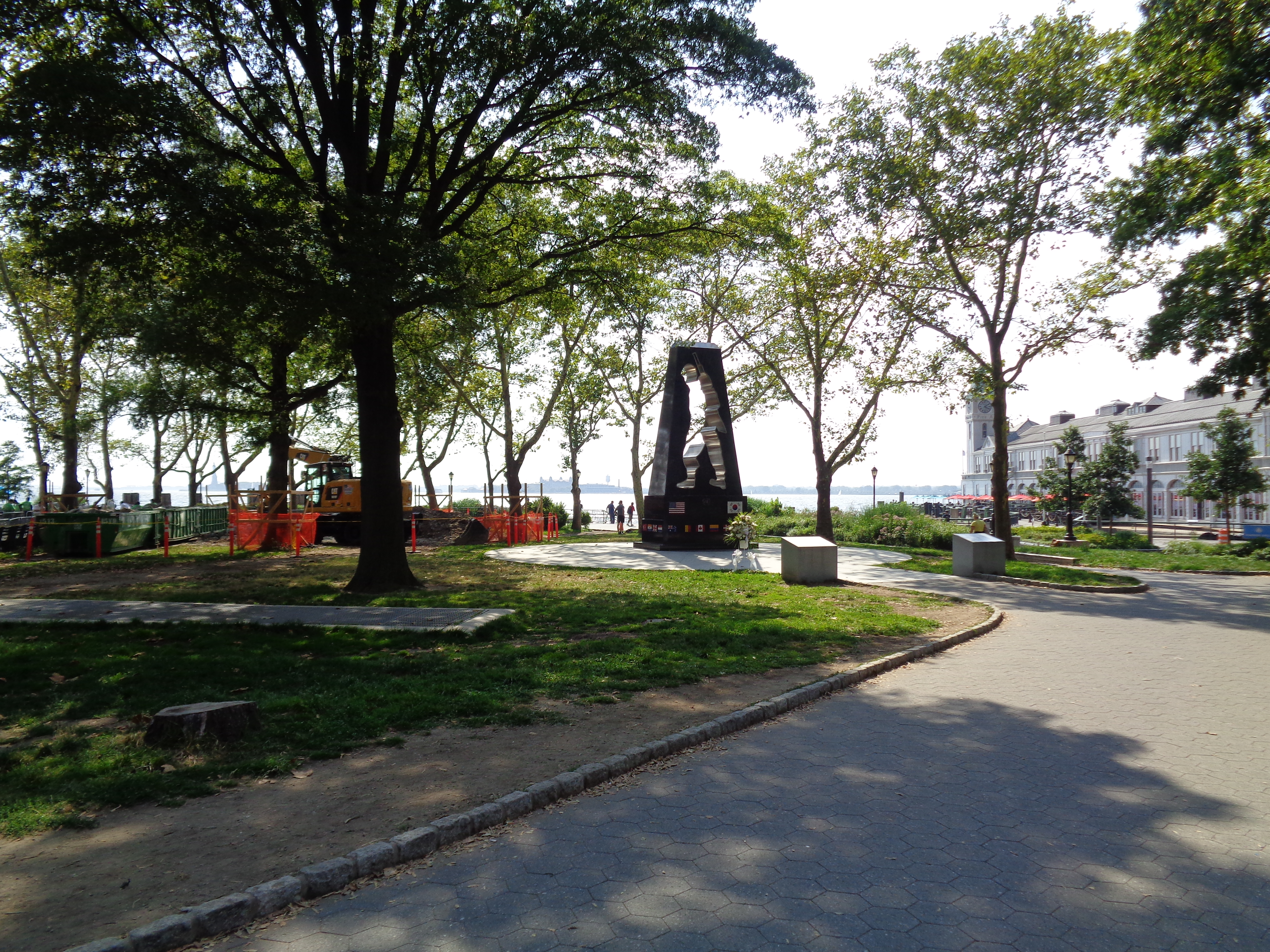
Korean War memorial in the Battery

The Battery contains multiple attractions and points of interest. Castle Clinton, a former fort, lies near the northwestern corner of the Battery and serves as the park's main attraction. To its north is the former fireboat station, Pier A, which was converted into a restaurant called Harbor House in 2014 and operated until 2020. Another eatery, the Battery Gardens restaurant, is located next to the United States Coast Guard Battery Building.

Located nearby is a 4-acre (1.6 ha) garden called the Battery Bosque, which was designed by Dutch landscape architect Piet Oudolf and is centered around a grove of 140 plane trees. An additional grove of 15 trees was dedicated at the park in 1976 as a gift from the city of Jerusalem. This area, located northwest of Castle Clinton, is called Jerusalem Grove. The northeastern corner hosts a lawn called the Battery Oval. The 90,000-square-foot (8,400 m^{2}) lawn opened in 2016 as part of a major restoration of the park, and contains turf made of Kentucky bluegrass. Along the waterfront, Statue City Cruises offers ferries to the Statue of Liberty and Ellis Island.

The southwestern corner of the Battery contains the SeaGlass Carousel, an attraction with bioluminescent design that pays homage not only to the carousel's waterfront site, but also to Castle Clinton's former status as an aquarium. The southeastern corner contains Peter Minuit Plaza, an intermodal passenger transport hub. The plaza hosts a bus terminal for the M15 SBS, M20 and M55 buses, an entrance to the Staten Island Ferry's Whitehall Terminal, entrances to the New York City Subway's South Ferry/Whitehall Street station, and taxi stands. The plaza also includes the New Amsterdam Plein and Pavilion, a pavilion gifted by the Kingdom of the Netherlands, which displays art, design, and horticulture.

The park is also the site of numerous memorials and monuments placed there over the years. As of 2010, the park saw over five million annual visitors. In 2016, the Battery Conservancy said that the park saw 600,000 visitors a month, which amounted to about 7.2 million visitors per year.

=== Castle Clinton ===
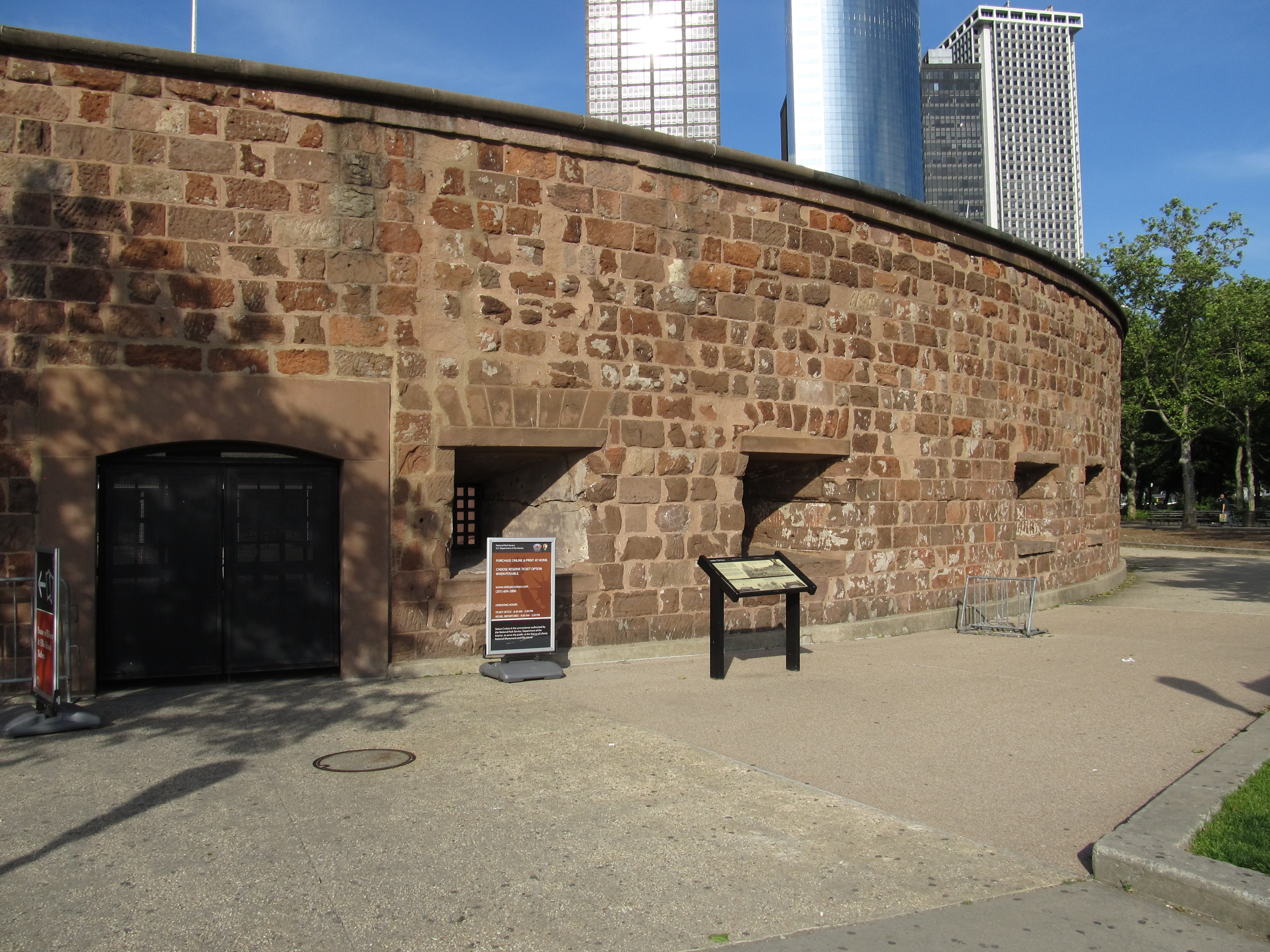
Castle Clinton National Monument

Castle Clinton was originally called the West Battery, it was built as a fort just prior to the War of 1812. It was renamed Castle Clinton in 1815 after the war, in honor of mayor DeWitt Clinton, and became property of the city in 1823. When leased by the city, it became a popular promenade and beer garden called Castle Garden. Later roofed over, it became one of the premier theatrical venues in the United States and contributed greatly to the development of New York City as the theater capital of the nation. In the early 1850s alone, the venue hosted such acts as Swedish soprano Jenny Lind, European dancing star Lola Montez, French conductor Louis-Antoine Jullien, and the Max Maretzek Italian Opera Company.

The migration of the city's elite uptown increased during the mid-19th century, and in 1855, Castle Garden was closed and made into the world's first immigration depot. The immigration center operated until 1890, just before the offshore immigration facility at Ellis Island opened. An estimated 7.7 million immigrants passed through the center during its operation. The structure then housed the New York Aquarium from 1896 to 1941, when it was closed as part of Triborough Bridge Authority commissioner Robert Moses's plans to build the Brooklyn-Battery Tunnel. Moses wanted to create a Fort Clinton memorial on the site, but would only keep Castle Clinton if the federal government agreed to pay for its restoration. Ultimately, Castle Clinton was preserved as part of a National Monument in 1946.

The structure was restored in 1975. Today, Castle Clinton retains its original name and is managed by the National Park Service. It contains a small history exhibit and ticket booths for the ferries to the Statue of Liberty and Ellis Island; in addition, it occasionally hosts concerts. As the site of the ferry ticket office, it recorded nearly 4.08 million visitors in 2009. According to data from the National Park Service, the Statue of Liberty National Monument, which includes Castle Clinton, was the most popular national monument in the United States that year.

=== SeaGlass Carousel ===
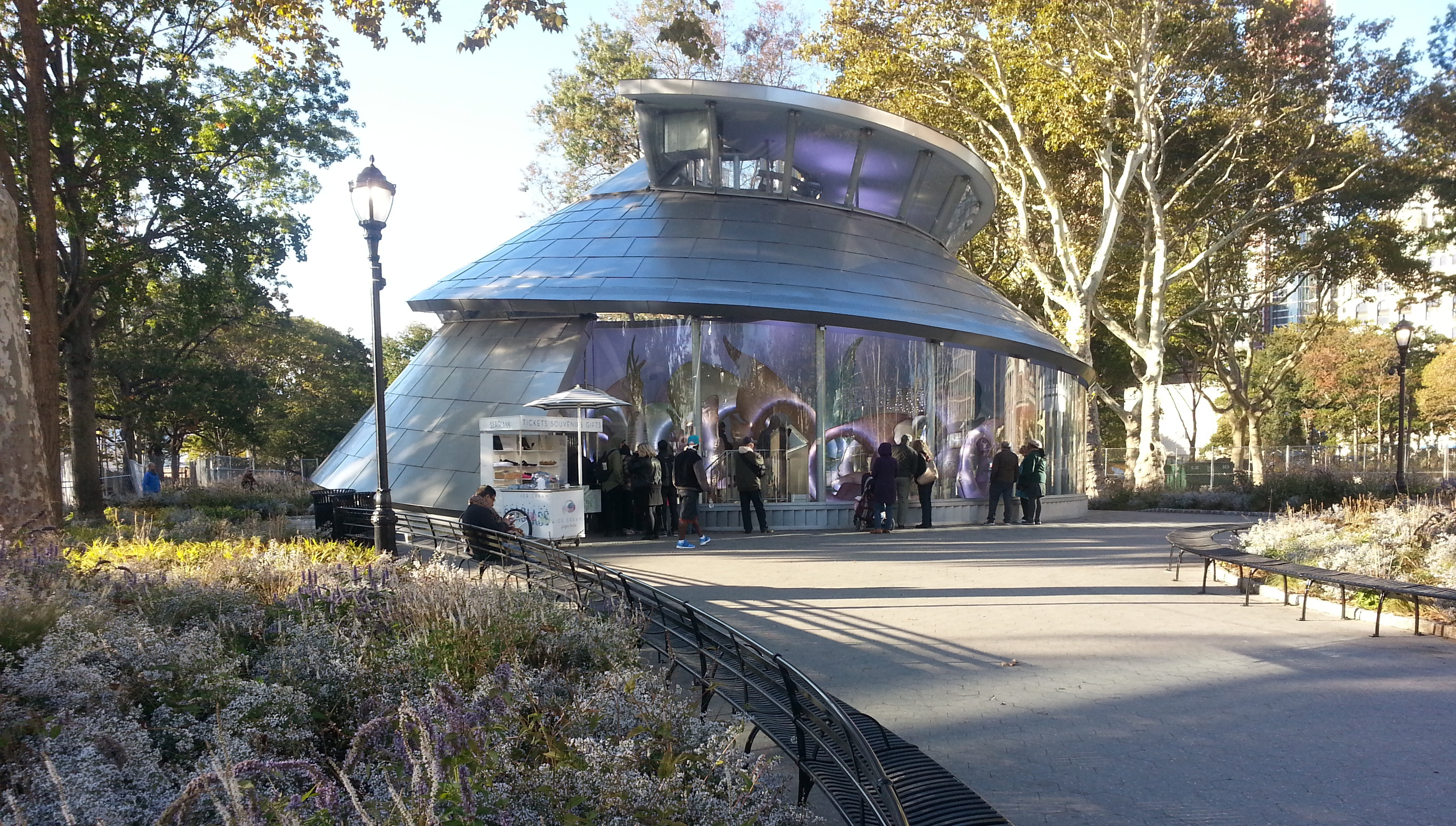
SeaGlass Carousel in October 2015

The SeaGlass Carousel was proposed in 2007 and opened in 2015; plans for the ride had been devised by Warrie Price, the founding president of the Battery Park Conservancy. The city and the Lower Manhattan Development Corporation each paid half of the $16 million cost. The carousel was designed by architectural firm WXY and artist George Tsypin. Music for the ride was created by Teddy Zambetti, a composer and music executive for SiriusXM. A ride lasts for three-and-a-half minutes. The carousel is designed to resemble an under-the-sea garden through which visitors ride on fish that appear to be made of sea glass and shimmer as though they were bioluminescent. The carousel features seating on species such as a Siamese fighting fish. The operating machinery is under the floor, so there is no post in the center of the ride.

=== Memorials ===
Battery Park contains over 20 monuments, many of which are clustered in an area called "Monument Walk".

==== Hope Garden ====
Within the park is Hope Garden, a memorial dedicated to AIDS victims, where The Sphere had been exhibited at times. The garden has also been used as a site for environmental demonstrations due to its fragility and the Battery's status as a tourist attraction. The Sphere was moved to Liberty Park in 2017.

==== Netherland Monument ====
The Netherland Monument with its flagpole was dedicated on December 6, 1926, as a gift from the Dutch in commemoration of the purchase of Manhattan Island three centuries prior. It was designed by Hendrik van den Eijnde (1869–1939), a sculptor from Haarlem in the Netherlands.

The monument was originally located south of Castle Clinton, but during the 1940–1952 renovation, the flagpole was relocated to the northeast entrance of the Battery, where it still stands. It was renovated and rededicated in 2000.

==== East Coast Memorial ====
East Coast Memorial

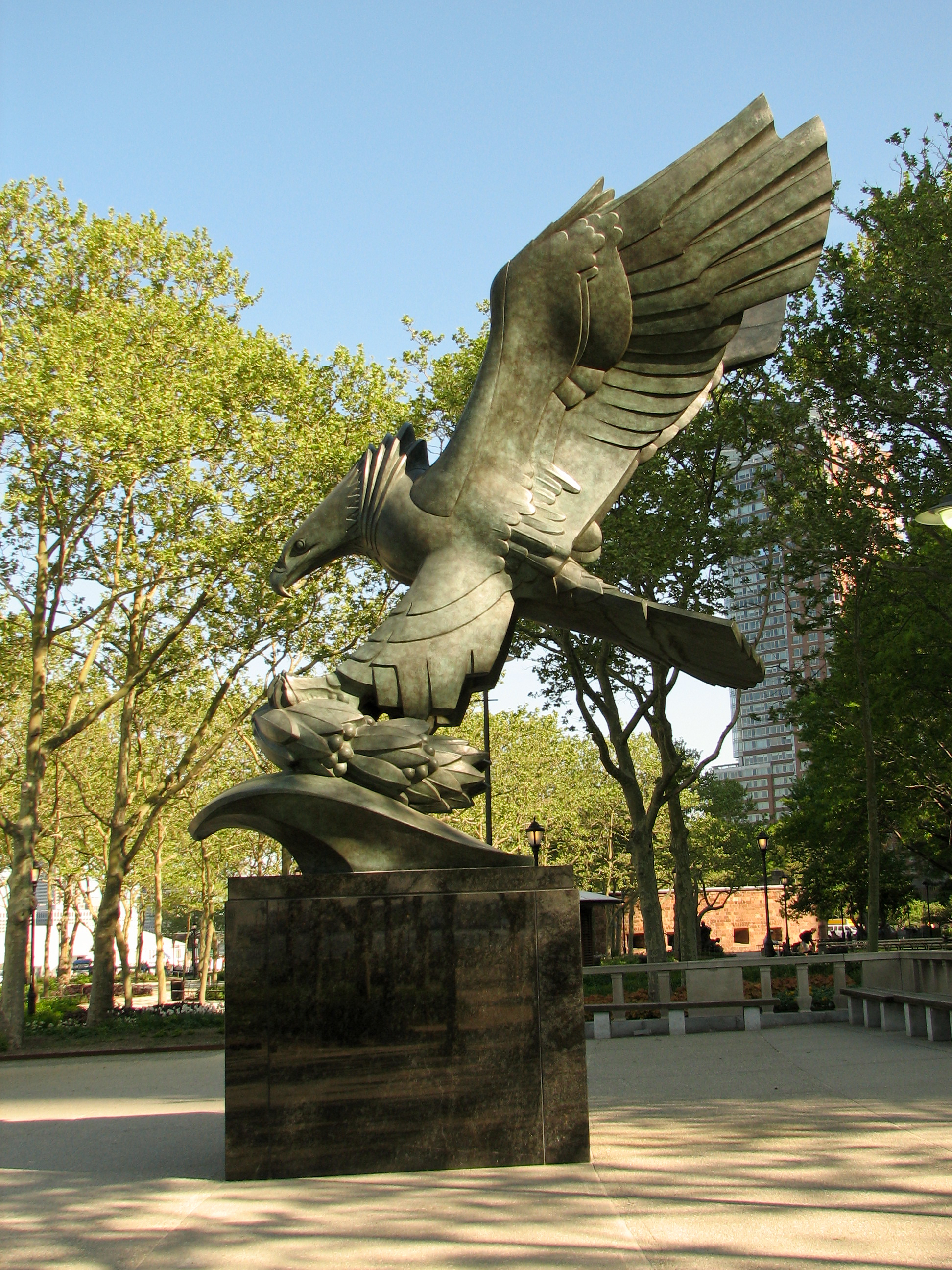
Eagle statue

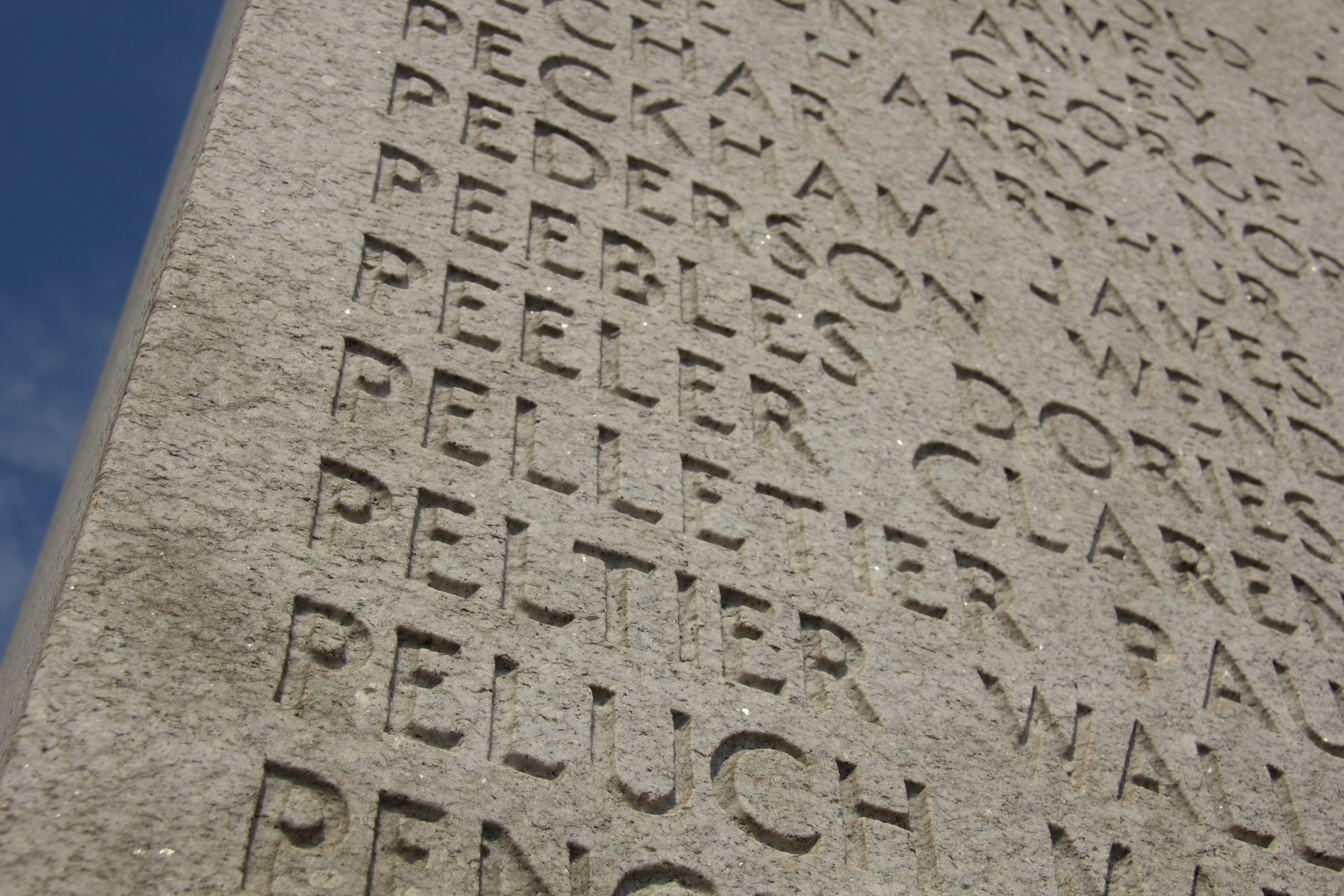
Engraved names

A World War II war memorial, the East Coast Memorial is one of three war memorials in the United States administered by the American Battle Monuments Commission; the others are the West Coast Memorial to the Missing of World War II in San Francisco and the Honolulu Memorial. The memorial commemorates U.S. servicemen who died in coastal waters of the western Atlantic Ocean during the Battle of the Atlantic. A total of 4,609 names are inscribed on both sides of eight 19-foot-tall granite pylons. The pylons are arranged in two rows of four each. Between the two rows stands a bronze statue of an eagle, erected on a black granite pedestal. The eagle faces the Statue of Liberty in New York Harbor.

The memorial was designed by the architectural firm of Gehron & Seltzer, while the eagle statue was created by Albino Manca, an Italian-born sculptor. The granite slabs were set up in October 1959; the sculpture was installed in February 1963, and the memorial was dedicated by President John F. Kennedy that May.

==== American Merchant Mariners' Memorial ====
American Merchant Mariners' Memorial

The American Merchant Mariners' Memorial sculpture, located in the Hudson River west of the park, is sited on a stone breakwater just south of Pier A and connected to the pier by a dock. It was designed by the sculptor Marisol Escobar and dedicated in 1991. The bronze sculpture depicts four merchant seamen with their sinking vessel after it had been attacked by German submarine U-123 during World War II. One of the seamen is in the water, and is covered by the sea with each high tide. The sculpture is loosely based on a real photograph by the U-boat's commander, of crewmen of the SS Muskogee, all of whom died at sea. The memorial was commissioned by the American Merchant Mariners' Memorial, Inc., chaired by AFL–CIO president Lane Kirkland.

==== Other memorials ====
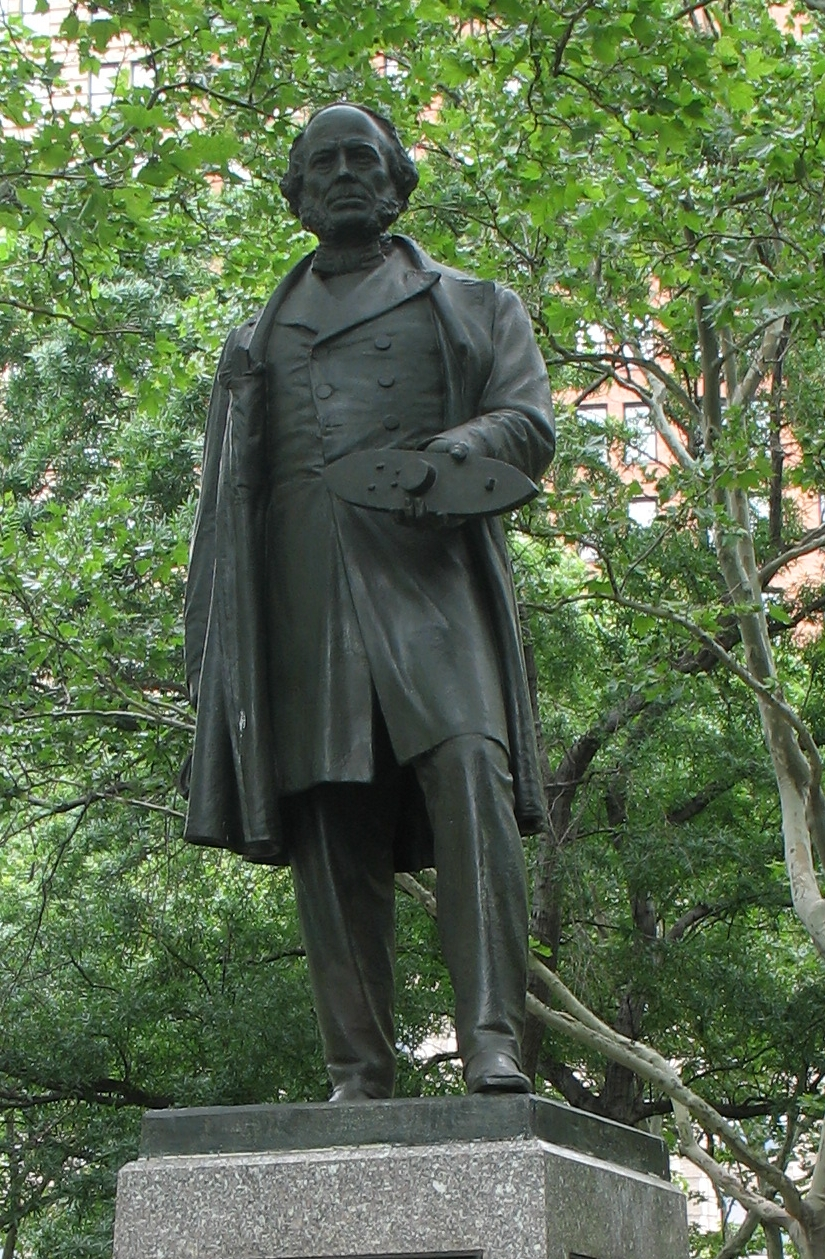
Statue of John Ericsson, holding a model of USS Monitor

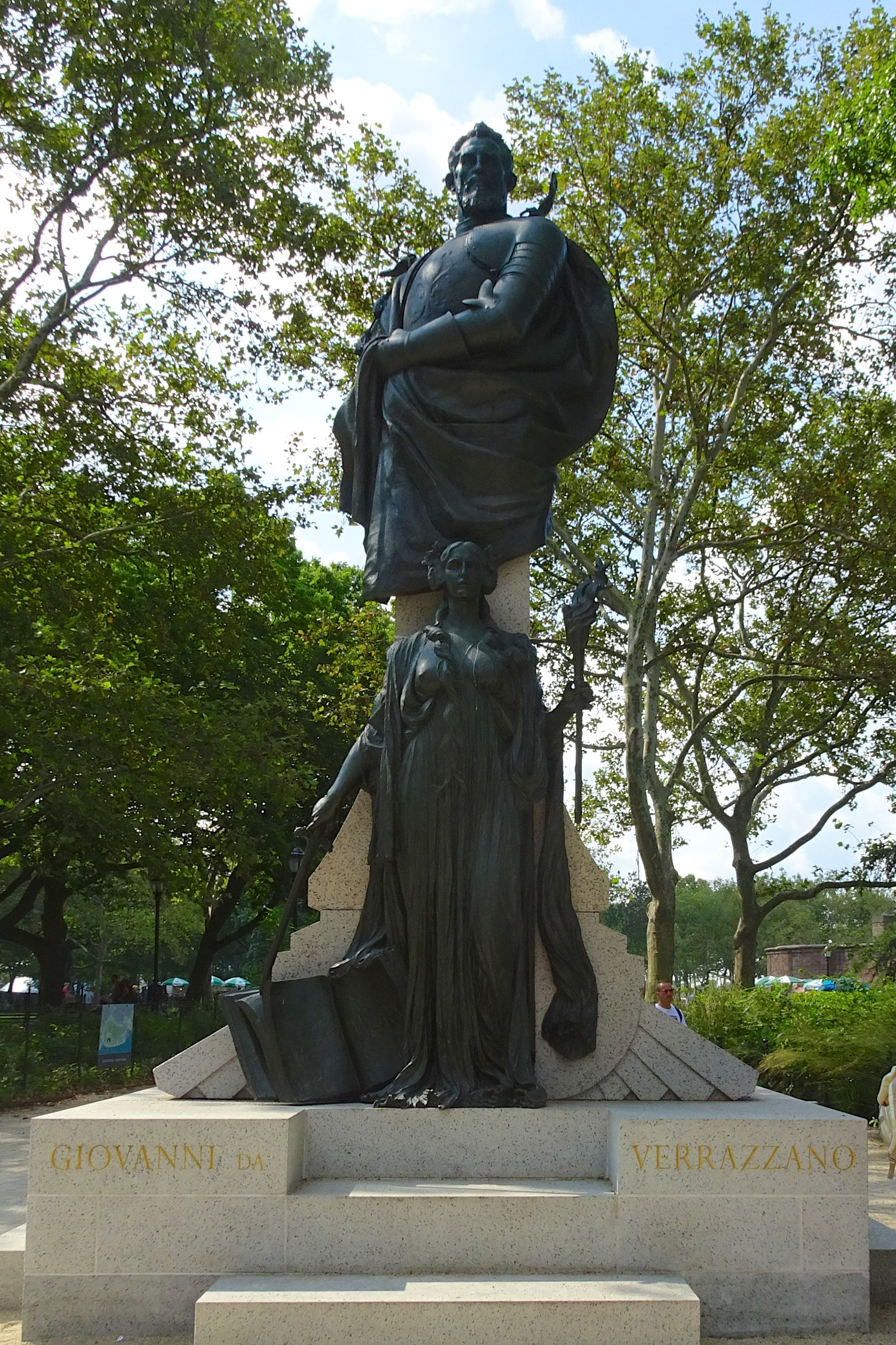
Giovanni da Verrazzano by Ettore Ximenes (1909)

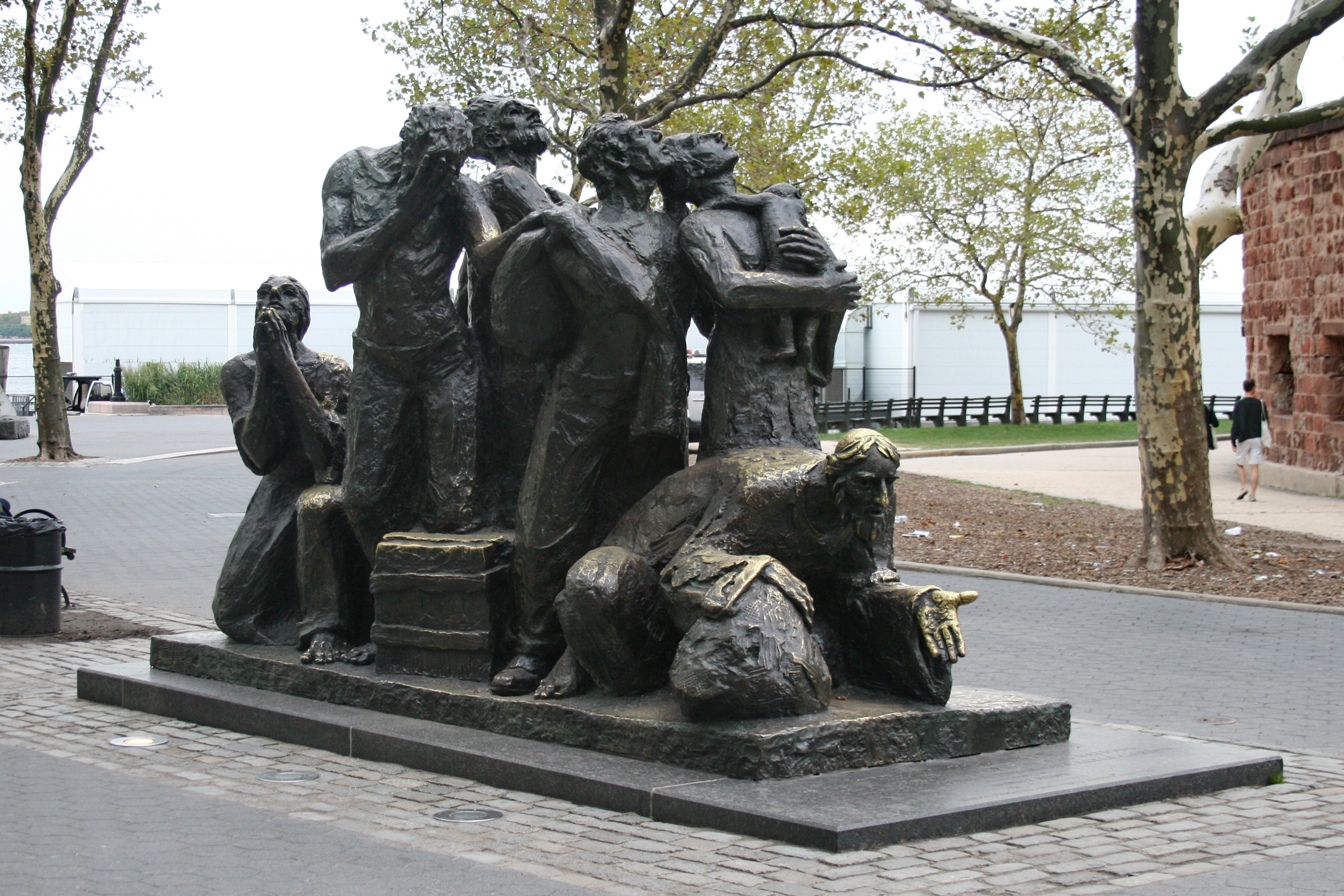
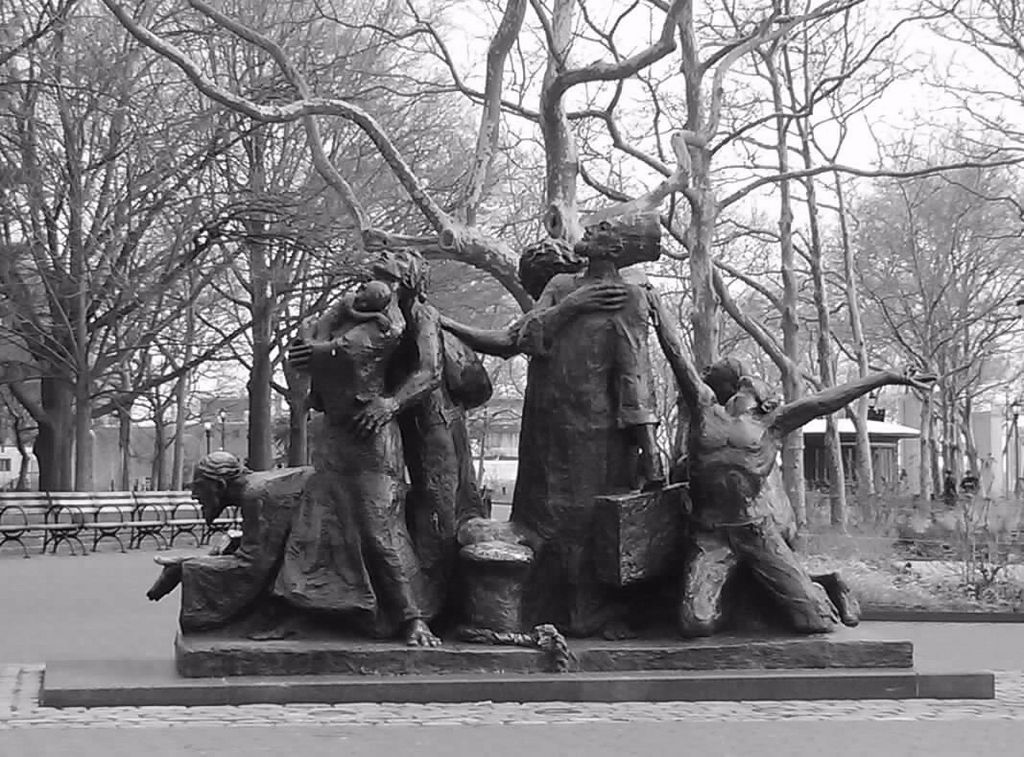
The Immigrants by Luis Sanguino

The park also contains several other memorials, including:

- The Immigrants (1983, rededicated 2005) – Located south of Castle Clinton, this statue by Luis Sanguino depicts multiple types of immigrants that would have passed through Castle Clinton in the late 19th century.
- Korean War Memorial (1991) – Located at Battery Place just northeast of Castle Clinton and designed by Mac Adams, it is a black granite obelisk dedicated to veterans of the Korean War. It was intended as one of the United States' first Korean War memorials.
- John Ericsson statue (1903) – Located near the center of the park, the statue was designed by Jonathan Scott Hartley. It commemorates Ericsson, a designer and innovator of ironclad warships, and depicts him holding a model of the USS Monitor.
- Walloon Settlers Memorial (1924) – Located at Battery Place, the memorial was designed by Henry Bacon. The monument is a stele dedicated to Jessé de Forest for his contributions to the founding of New York City, and marked the 300th anniversary of the settlers' migration.
- Giovanni da Verrazzano (1909) – Located at Battery Place, the memorial was designed by Ettore Ximenes. It is a statue of Verrazzano, the first European to sail into New York Harbor, on a pedestal.
- World War II Coast Guard Memorial (1955) – Located at the extreme southeast end of Battery Park, this memorial was designed by Norman M. Thomas and depicts three figures on a pedestal.
- Wireless Operators Memorial (1915, rededicated 1952) – Located near the center of the park, the monument consists of a cenotaph commemorating wireless telegraph operators who went down with their ships.
- River That Flows Two Ways (2000) – Located on the Admiral Dewey Promenade as part of the waterfront railing, this piece of public art was designed by Wopo Holup.

Temporary monuments have also been installed in the Battery, such as the Staten Island Ferry Disaster Memorial Museum, a 2016 piece memorializing a fake octopus attack on the Staten Island Ferry, as well as a "UFO Tugboat Abduction Memorial" from the same sculptor as the ferry "memorial".

At least ten monuments, including the Verrazzano, Coast Guard and Wireless memorials, were stored in the park behind a temporary fence from the mid-2000s until 2016. Controversy over the statues' integrity arose in 2015 after renovations took longer than expected. Representatives of NYC Park Advocates and the Italian-American organization UNICO expressed concern about the statues' condition, although experts said there should be no long-term physical harm. The monuments have since been installed in or around the perimeter of the park, although not necessarily in their previous locations. Prior to the restoration, which cost $875,000, some of the monuments had not been restored for 60 years.

== Surroundings ==
=== Around the park ===
To the northwest of the park lies Battery Park City, a planned community built on landfill in the 1970s and 1980s, which includes Robert F. Wagner Park and the Battery Park City Promenade. Battery Park City, proposed in 1966, was named after the park.

Battery Park contains the Battery Bikeway, a component piece of the Manhattan Waterfront Greenway, a system of parks, bikeways, and promenades around Manhattan Island. The bicycle path was completed in late 2015 and consists of terracotta pavings near the waterfront, adjacent to a 20-foot (6.1 m) pedestrian walkway. The bikeway contains three connections to other parts of the Manhattan Waterfront Greenway:

- A bike path originates on the northern side of the Battery and runs parallel to the West Side Highway to its west. North of Battery Park City, the bikeway continues into Hudson River Park, which extends up the Hudson River shoreline.
- Another bike path exits the Battery from the northwest and runs directly on the shore of the Hudson River through Battery Park City.
- At the Battery's southeast end, the bikeway continues as the East River Greenway, which runs next to FDR Drive.

Across State Street to the northeast is Bowling Green, as well as the old U.S. Customs House, now used as a branch of the National Museum of the American Indian and the district U.S. Bankruptcy Court. Peter Minuit Plaza abuts the southeast end of the park, directly in front of the Staten Island Ferry's Whitehall Terminal at South Ferry.

=== Under the park ===
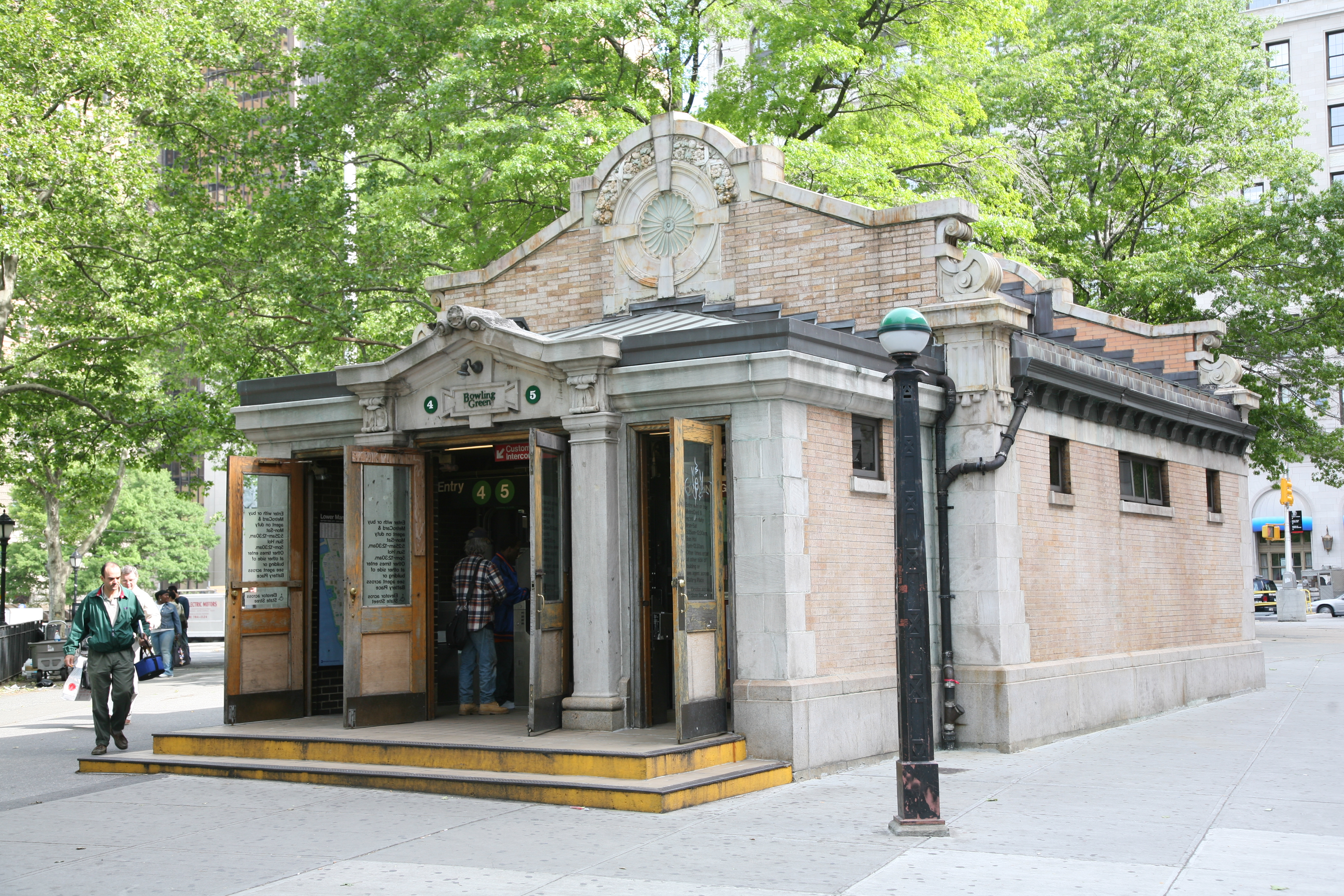
The Battery Park control house, a landmark subway entrance at the edge of the park, which provides an entrance to the Bowling Green subway station

Two road tunnels and several rail tunnels run under Battery Park. The Brooklyn–Battery Tunnel, opened 1950, carries vehicular traffic to Brooklyn. The Battery Park Underpass, opened 1951, carries vehicular traffic from the West Side Highway to the FDR Drive.

Several New York City Subway tunnels also run under the Battery. The old South Ferry station, opened 1905 as part of the city's first subway line, the former Interborough Rapid Transit Company's Broadway–Seventh Avenue and Lexington Avenue Lines have a balloon loop to enable trains to turn around and switch between the two lines. It closed in 2009 following the opening of a replacement subway station. The replacement station, South Ferry on the Broadway–Seventh Avenue Line (1 train), opened in 2009, created a new free connection with the BMT Broadway Line's Whitehall Street station (N, R, and W trains), comprising the South Ferry/Whitehall Street station complex. The new station sustained severe damage following Hurricane Sandy in October 2012 and the old loop station was temporarily reactivated between April 2013 and June 2017, when the new station reopened.

The Bowling Green station, which opened in 1905 as part of the original subway, serves the 4 and 5 trains at the northeast corner of the park. Its original entrance, or "Control House", is a New York City designated landmark. Tracks leading south of the station go to both the old South Ferry station and to the Joralemon Street Tunnel, which skirts the park before traveling under the East River.

==== Discovery of wall ====
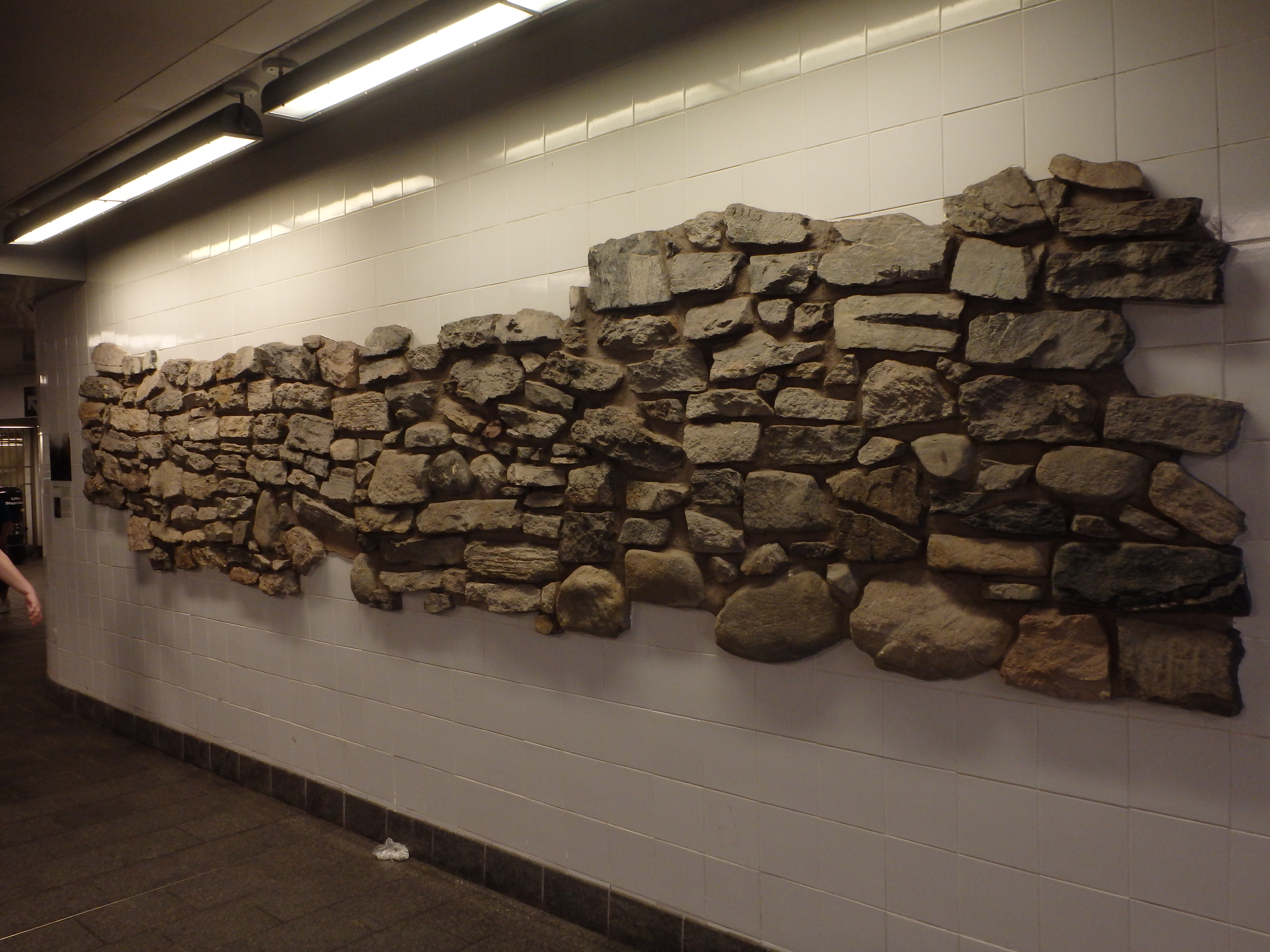
A piece of the old wall (perhaps from the 17th century), discovered during excavations in the 21st century, are here used as artwork in the new South Ferry subway station

In late 2005, New York City authorities announced that builders working on the new station had found the remains of a stone wall from the British colonial era, during the late 17th or 18th century. After archeological analysis, the wall was widely reported to be the oldest man-made structure still in place in Manhattan. Four walls and over 250,000 individual artifacts were found, and a portion of one wall was placed on temporary display inside Castle Clinton. Another, long portion of the wall was embedded permanently into the entrance to the newly constructed station, at the same depth below street level as originally discovered.

Robert Tierney, chairman of the New York City Landmarks Preservation Commission, said that the wall was probably built to protect the park's original artillery batteries. The remains were described as "an important remnant of the history of New York City".

== See also ==
- Astoria (turkey) – A resident bird of the park
- Zelda (turkey) – A resident bird of the park
