= Grisel (surname) =

Grisel is a French surname. Notable people with the surname include:

- Adolphe Grisel (1872–1942), French athlete and gymnast
- Matys Grisel (born 2005), French road cyclist

== See also ==
- Grisel
- Grizel
