= Zelda (given name) =

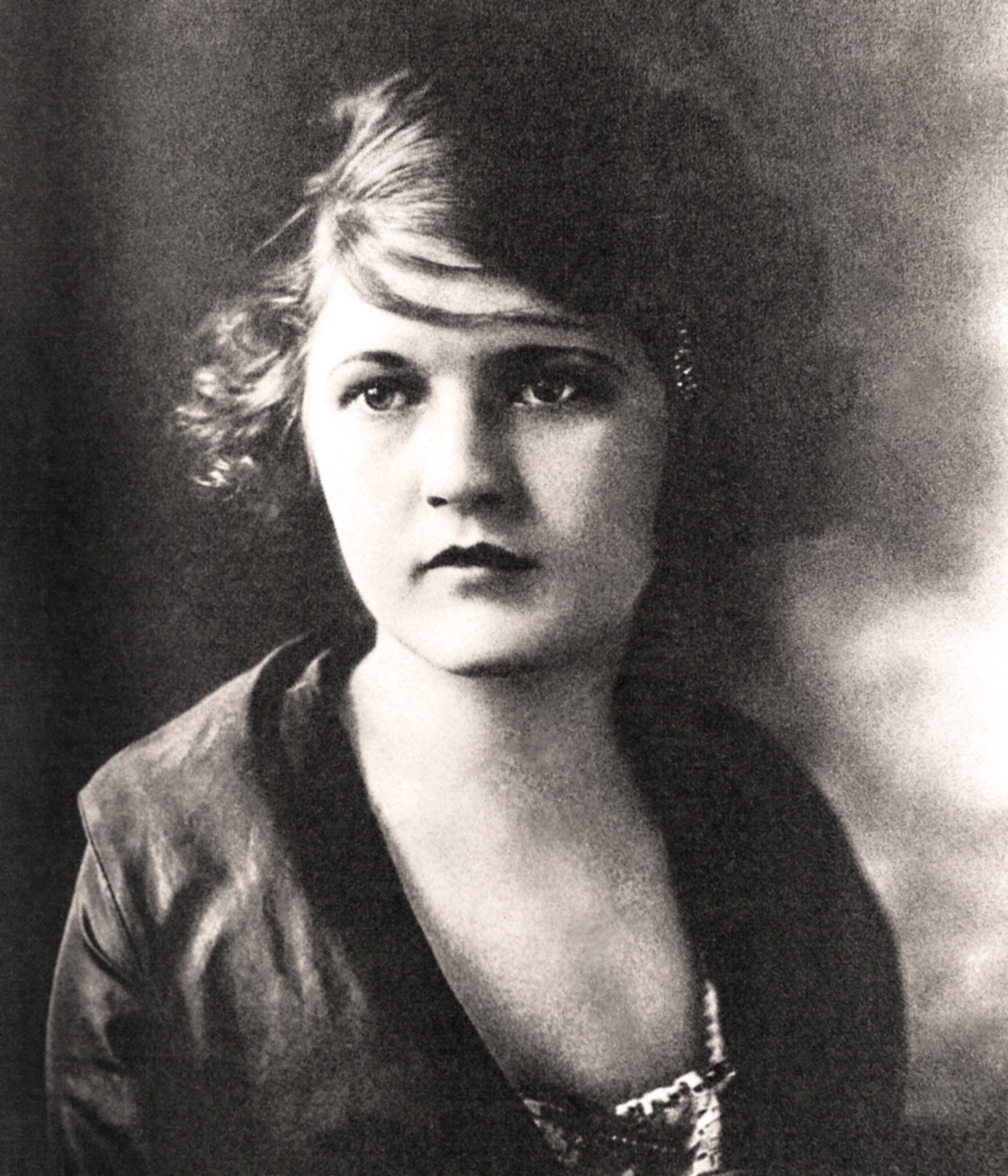
- Zelda Fitzgerald
- Gender: Female

Zelda is a nickname for the feminine name Griselda, from Old High German Grisja Hilda, 'Grey Battle-maid'. It is also (Yiddish: זעלדאַ or זעלדע, Hebrew: זלדה) the feminine form of the Yiddish name Zelig, (זעליג) meaning 'blessed', 'happy'.

Since 1986, the name has been associated with the popular Nintendo franchise The Legend of Zelda and its eponymous character Princess Zelda.

== People ==
- Zelda Barron (1929–2006), British director, screenwriter, and producer
- Zelda Curtis (1923–2012), British journalist
- Zelda D'Aprano (1928–2018), Australian feminist activist
- Zelda Fichandler (1924–2016), American stage producer, director, and educator
- Zelda Fitzgerald (1900–1948), American writer, painter, and socialite; wife of F. Scott Fitzgerald
- Zelda F. Gamson (1936–2026), American sociologist, writer, and activist
- Zelda Harris (born 1985), American actress
- Zelda Jongbloed (1950–2018), South African journalist and politician
- Zelda Kahan (1886–1969), British communist
- Zelda Kaplan (1917–2012), American socialite
- Zelda La Grange (born 1970), South African former private secretary to President Nelson Mandela
- Zelda Lockhart, American writer, speaker, teacher, and researcher
- Zelda McCague (1888–2001), Canadian supercentenarian
- Zelda Nolte (1929–2005) British sculptor
- Zelda Nordlinger (1932–2008), American feminist and women's rights activist coordinator
- Zelda Popkin (1898–1983), American mystery novelist
- Zelda Rubinstein (1933–2010), American actress
- Zelda Schneersohn Mishkovsky (1914–1984), (pen-name “Zelda”), Israeli poet, notable writer of Hebrew religious poetry
- Zelda Sears (1873–1935), American entertainer
- Zelda Seguin Wallace (1848–1914), American opera singer and suffragist
- Zelda the Brain, a female professional wrestler from the Gorgeous Ladies of Wrestling
- Zelda Tinska (born 1978), Serbian actress
- Zelda Williams (born 1989), American actress, director, producer, and writer; daughter of Robin Williams
- Zelda Wynn Valdes (1905–2001), American fashion designer and costumer
- Zelda Zabinsky, American industrial engineer and operations researcher
- Sean N. Zelda, musician who founded the band We Came as Romans
- Zelda Zonk, a pseudonym used by Marilyn Monroe (1926–1962)

== See also ==
- Zelda (disambiguation) for a list that includes fictional characters
