= Griselda Pascual =

Spanish mathematician

Griselda Pascual y Xufré
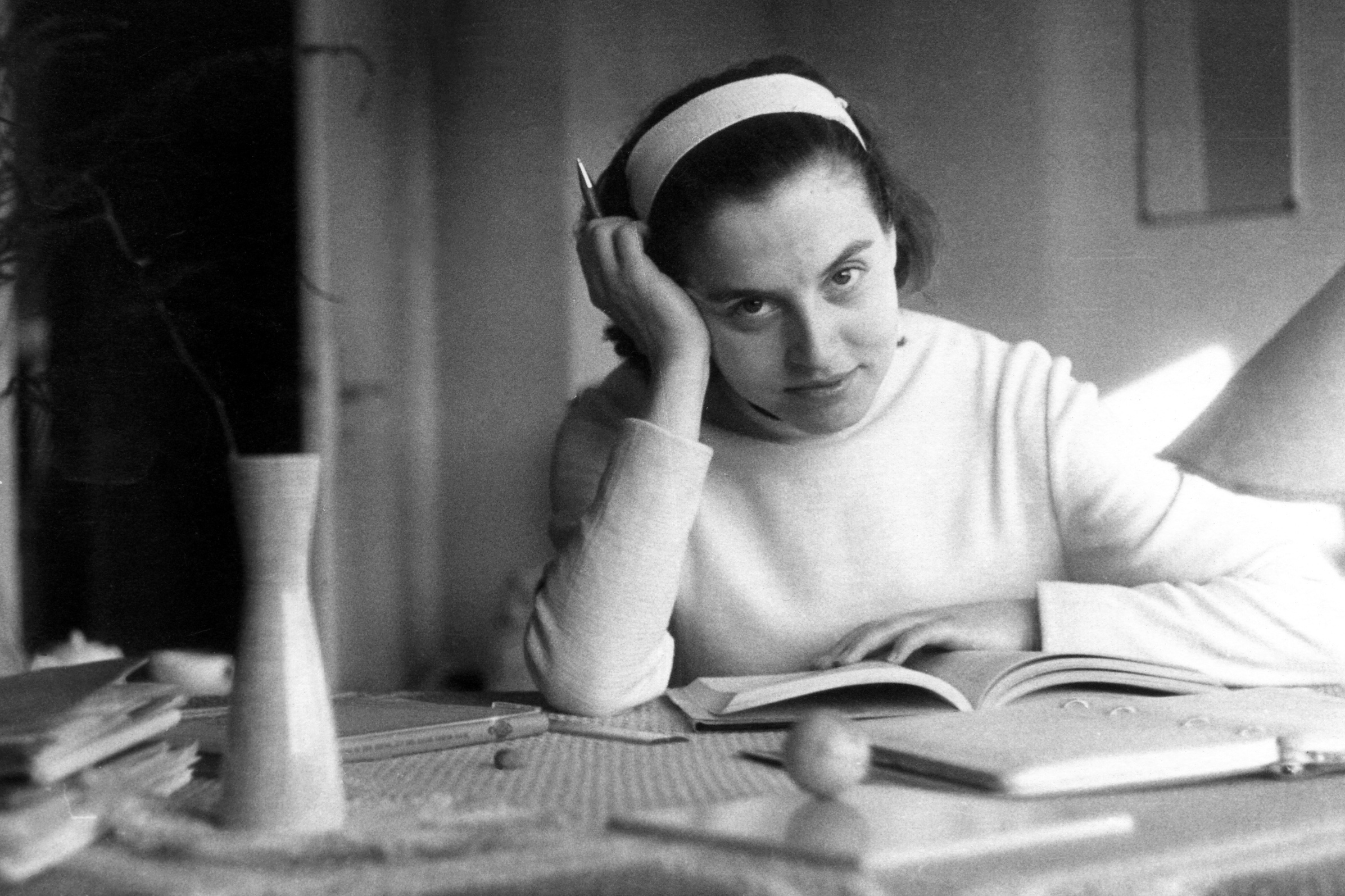
- Picture taken during Pascual's stay in Germany to study Differential Geometry.
- Born: 11 February 1926; Barcelona, Spain
- Died: 8 June 2001 (aged 75); Barcelona, Spain
- Education: University of Barcelona
- Occupation: Mathematician
- Known for: Catalan translation: Disquisitiones arithmeticae

Griselda Pascual y Xufré (11 February 1926 in Barcelona – 8 June 2001) was a Spanish mathematician linked to research and teaching as well as translating math texts into the Catalan language. Her basic line of research was algebraic number theory.

== Life and work ==
She was born into a family with a long artistic tradition and social concerns, which valued the education and development of women in the cultural and professional field. She lived with her father, the then-renowned painter Julio Pascual, as well as two aunts, both school teachers, who all supported Griselda's intellectual and cultural development. She received her first training at the Women's Cultural Institution, which she graduated at age 16.

Initially, she studied teaching and only began studying mathematics after she had earned the title of teacher. She graduated in Exact Sciences from the University of Barcelona in January 1947 and that same year she was appointed assistant professor at the university, making her the first female teacher in its Faculty of Sciences.

=== Professor ===
In 1950, Pascual was appointed professor at the Instituto de Enseñanzas Medias de Tortosa (Tarragona) and, later, professor at the Instituto Maragall in Barcelona, reaching management positions between 1965 and 1968. She worked as an institute professor between 1950 and 1985.

She specialized in Didactics of Mathematics and received a scholarship from the Higher Council for Scientific Research (CSIC). She also obtained a Von Humboldt scholarship with which she was able to study Differential Geometry in Freiburg (Germany) between 1958 and 1959. Upon returning to Barcelona, she participated in the reform of secondary education, introducing the so-called Modern Mathematics.

Pascual received her doctorate in Exact Sciences in 1975 and became a tenured professor of Algebra at the University of Barcelona in 1985. In 1991, she was the first female teacher to retire from the Faculty of Mathematics of the University of Barcelona. Her last lesson dealt with the work of German mathematician Leopold Kronecker.

=== Translator ===
She translated numerous university mathematical books into the Catalan language. According to Pilar Bayer Isant, "Her translation into Catalan of Carl Friedrich Gauss's Disquisitiones arithmeticae, whose Latin original was published in Leipzig in 1801, deserves special mention."

=== Personal life ===
Pascual died in Barcelona on 8 June 2001.
