= Grizel Cochrane =

Grizel Cochrane is a figure from 17th century Scottish lore. Cochrane's father, John Cochrane of Ochiltree, had been captured following the Monmouth Rebellion against the rule of James VII, in 1685, and was therefore scheduled to be condemned to death. According to the legend, in order to prevent the execution from being carried out, Grizel disguised herself as a man and robbed the postman who carried the death warrant, on a lonely part of Tweedmouth Moor. When initial efforts to seek a pardon were unsuccessful, Grizel robbed the postman a second time fourteen days later, to again stave off the execution. The second robbery provided enough time for the pardon to be secured.

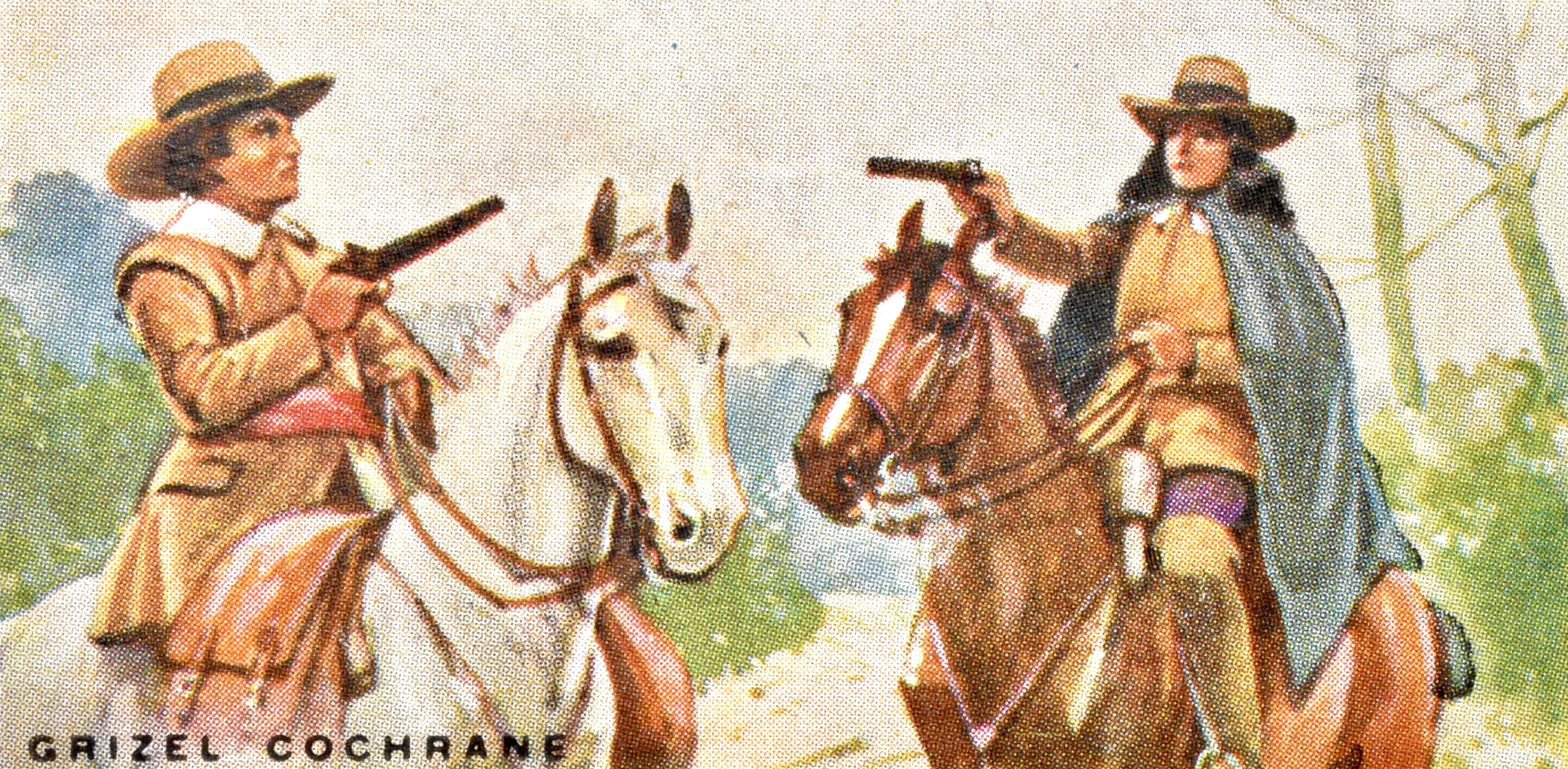
A cigarette card by W.D. & H.O. Wills depicting Grizel Cochrane robbing His Majesty's mail, 1686.

She threatened the man with instant death, and so terrified him that she obtained possession of the papers he carried. As she had foreseen, this delay in the execution gave time for friends in London to raise a ransom, so the heroic girl saved her father and made her name famous in Scottish legend.

Mr. [Catesby]’s father, a merchant in Edinburgh, had married a daughter of Sir John Stuart, whose mother was a grand-daughter of Miss Grizel Cochrane, daughter of Sir John Cochrane, the son of the first Earl of Dundonald. We have mentioned the course of this genealogy for the sake of noticing an unexampled instance of female heroism and filial affection performed by Grizel Cochrane in behalf of her father, who was one of the principal performers in Argyle's rebellion against the tyranny and bigotry of James the Second. The doom that enveloped the house of Campbell affected the safety of Sir John Cochrane; he was taken prisoner after a deadly struggle, tried, and condemned to die upon the scaffold. The royal warrant for his execution was hourly expected— the prisoner's father, the Earl of Dundonald, hastened to London, to exert his influence in behalf of his unfortunate son—but he had scarcely left the good city of Berwick ere the authorities were apprised that the next mail would bring the death warrant of Sir John. But that mail never reached its destination—the rider was attacked upon the dreary moor of Tweedmouth, by a stripling in a coarse jerkin and cloak, who grasped the mail bag and disappeared in the shades of the might. The prisoner was not led to execution. Fourteen days elapsed, and the efforts of his father were unsuccessful—a letter was received from the anxious parent with the painful intelligence that another warrant was to be despatched by the ensuing mail. Preparations were again made for the execution, when news reached the city that the mail carrier had again been robbed—not only of the mail, but of his horse, on which the assailer mounted with the leathern bag, and fled rapidly away. Fourteen days must again elapse ere the warrant could be renewed—but just before the expiration of the time, the old Earl of Dundonald rushed into the arms of his son, and proved to be the bearer of his pardon, wrung from the king, by the interest of Father Petre, his confessor, who had stipulated to receive the sum of five thousand pounds as the price of his intercession. The mail robber was the prisoner's daughter, Grizel Cochrane, who, in disguise, had twice perilled her life in attempting the arduous achievement, but received her reward in the rescue of her beloved sire.

A Scottish ballad titled Cochrane's Bonny Grizzy was written in honor of the account.

The same doom befell Sir John Cochrane; for he was surrounded by the King's troops, and though he made a desperate resistance, was overpowered and conveyed to prison in Edinburgh. His trial was brief, the judgment decisive, and the jailor waited but the arrival of his death warrant from London to lead him forth to execution, when Grizel Cochrane, the pride of his life, and the noble daughter of his house, determined on rescuing her father from the scaffold. Having received his blessing, she wended her solitary way to Berwick, disguised in a palmer's weeds: and robbed the man of the London Mail as described in the Ballad. Every exertion was made to discover the robber, but in vain. Three days had passed: Sir John Cochrane yet lived, and before another order for his execution could reach Edinburgh, the intercession of his father, the Earl of Dundonald, with the King's Confessor might be successful. Grizel now became his only companion in prison, and spoke to him words of comfort. Nearly fourteen days had now elapsed since the commission of the robbery, and protracted hope began to make sick the heart of the prisoner. The intercession of Dundonald had been unsuccessful, and a second time the bigoted and despotic monarch signed the warrant for Cochrane's death. "The will of Heaven be done," exclaimed the nobleman, when the jailor informed his prisoner of the circumstance. "Amen," said the heroic Grizzy with wild vehemence; "but my father shall not die." To save him, as the Ballad informs us,

She aiblins kenned a way.

Her masculine garments were again in requisition; again the rider had almost gained the Moor of Tweedmouth, bearing with him the doom of Cochrane; but Grizzy was at her post, and again despoiled him of his packet. By this second robbery Grizzy insured her father's life for fourteen days, the time then necessary to ride between London and the Scottish metropolis. But on this occasion, Dundonald and several Lords of great worth and consideration, used the time so effectually, that Sir John Cochrane was liberated and pardoned.

Grizel Cochrane, whose heroic conduct and filial affection we have imperfectly sketched, was, according to tradition, the great-grandmother of the late Sir John Stuart of Allanbank, and great-great-grandmother of the celebrated Mr. Coutts, the Banker; but a few years ago the author of the Border Tales received a letter from Sir Hugh Stuart, son of Sir John, stating that his family would be glad to have such a heroine as Grizel connected with their genealogy; but that they were unable to prove such connexion. A few miles from Belford may yet be seen a solitary clump of fir trees, walled round, and standing by the road side, which is yet called "Grizzy's clump," and pointed out as a part of the thicket from whence Cochrane's bonny dochter fired on the carrier of the mail. We have lost much of the wisdom of our ancestors, and amongst other matters, the folly of sending one horseman with the mail, who had already been despoiled of his charge.
