= Zelda (turkey) =

Wild turkey

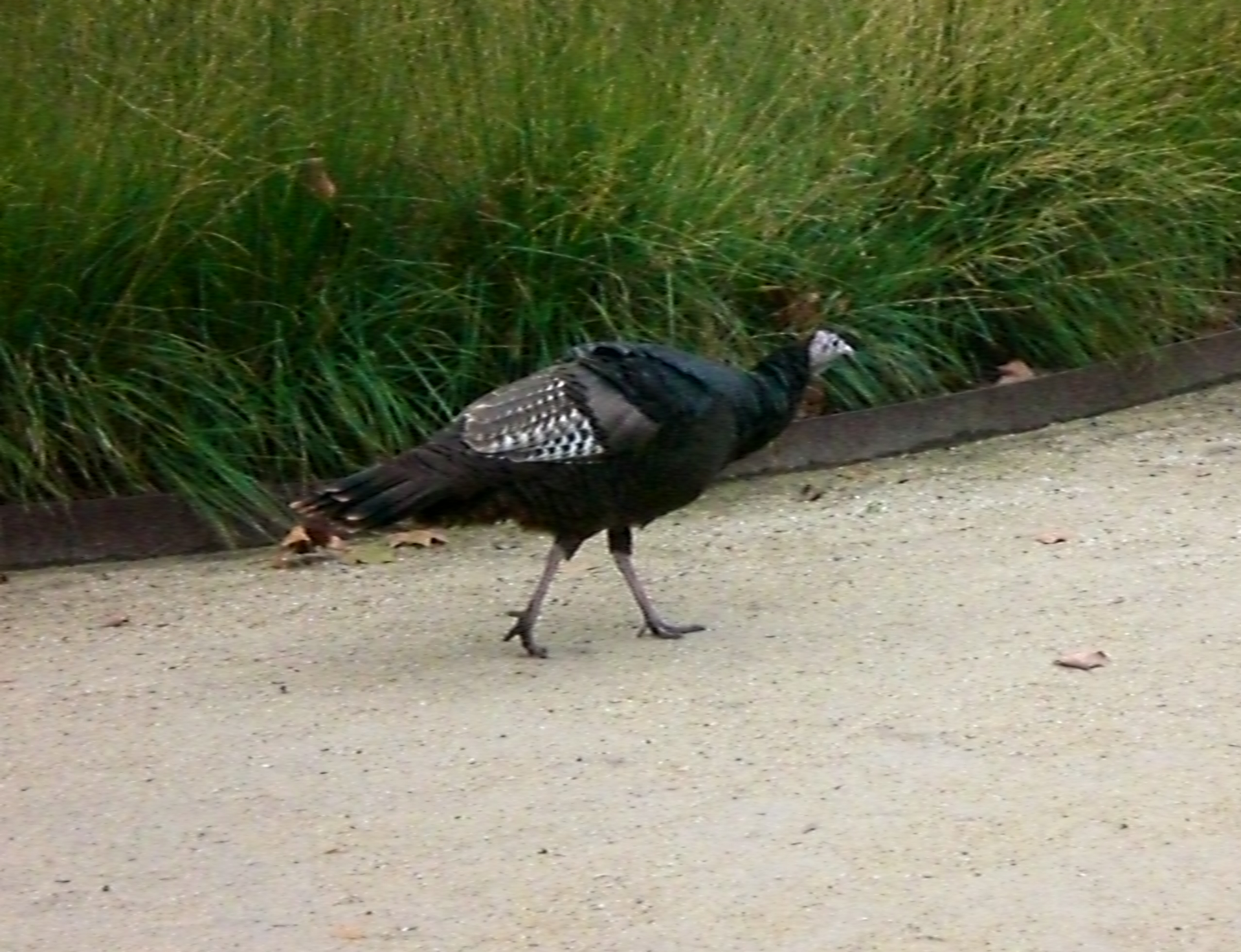
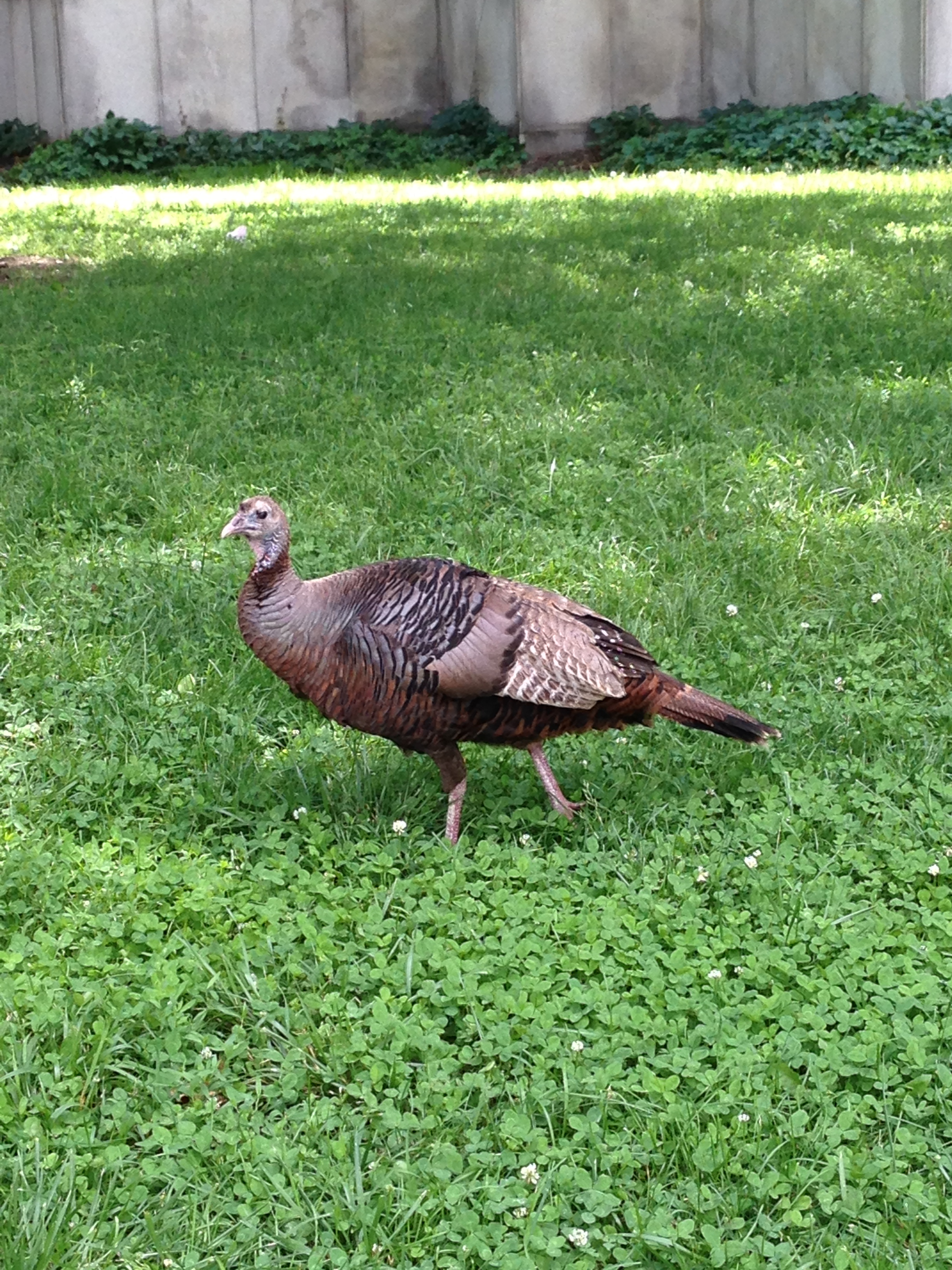
Zelda at the Battery

Zelda was a female wild turkey that lived at the Battery, a park in New York City, between mid-2003 and c. September 26, 2014. Although flocks of wild turkeys are more common in the city's greener parts (including the Bronx's Pelham Bay Park and Van Cortlandt Park and Staten Island's South Beach Psychiatric Hospital) due to the ban on hunting, Zelda was believed to be the only one in Manhattan. Previous Manhattan turkeys included Giuliani (at Riverside Park; this turkey may have actually been Zelda due to her appearance coinciding with Zelda's migration) and Hedda Gobbler (at Morningside Park).

== Life and death ==
Zelda was named after Zelda Fitzgerald, because (according to legend) during one of Zelda Fitzgerald's nervous breakdowns, she went missing and was found in Battery Park, apparently having walked several miles downtown. It is presumed that Zelda (the turkey) entered Manhattan's north end from the Bronx in 2002 as a wild turkey fitting her description was first spotted in Riverside Park and then near the American Museum of Natural History and Tavern on the Green. She continued to make her way downtown before finally settling in Battery Park.

She occasionally wandered from the park, possibly in search of a mate. Each summer she left the park to nest and lay unfertilized eggs. In 2004 she was seen in Tribeca before being captured and returned to Battery Park. In 2007 a turkey, presumably Zelda, was spotted in Greenwich Village and Tribeca. She spent the summer of 2013 in nearby Battery Park City.

In 2006 and again in 2009, she garnered wider attention when some tourists began to fear for her safety around Thanksgiving. In 2012, she again drew attention when it was realized that she survived Hurricane Sandy after having been missing for five days. While most wild turkeys only live to be six years old, Zelda was at least 10.

On October 9, 2014, it was announced that Zelda had been found dead during the previous week, following an automobile collision.

== Giuliani ==
Giuliani is the name given to a female wild turkey spotted in Riverside Park, who may have actually have been Zelda. A wild turkey was spotted in Riverside Park (adjacent to the North/Hudson River) as early as 2003, and wild turkeys have been reported there since.

== See also ==
- List of individual birds
- Astoria (turkey)
