= Zelda Nordlinger =

American feminist and women's rights activist coordinator

Zelda Kingoff Norldinger (1932 – 18 March 2008) was an American feminist and women's rights activist coordinator for the National Organization for Women (NOW) chapter in Virginia during the 1960s.

== Early life ==
Zelda K. Norldinger was born in South Carolina in 1932 to parents Joseph and Alice Kingoff. She moved to Richmond Virginia in 1947. She graduated from Thomas Jefferson High School in 1950 and Marjorie Webster Jr. College in 1952. After attending the Sally Thomkins School of Practical Nursing, Nordlinger graduated in 1984 from Virginia Commonwealth University with a Bachelor of Arts degree.

== Career ==
Zelda Kingoff Nordlinger, influenced by Betty Friedan's influential book, The Feminine Mystique, launched into efforts which would organize and empower women in the Richmond area in the late 1960s. Nordlinger hoped to congregate with local women to discuss women's concerns, goals, and experiences by forming a discussion group. Nordlinger plastered flyers in local establishments including the YMCA to gain support and awareness for this effort, forming the Women's Rights of Richmond, VA. This group of women, including women's activist Mary Holt Woolfork Carlton, would eventually become the founding members of the Richmond Chapter of the National Organization for Women. (NOW is a nationwide women's activist organization which focuses on attaining equality for women by ending discriminatory policies which restrict women's rights, including female reproductive rights, vocational and financial opportunities, political representation and status, and societal stigmatization.)

With the addition of new women from the ERA in 1974, this chapter changed for the better. This new group of women worked on procedure and organization and became a success. The combination of these two groups of women led Richmond's NOW chapter to work towards higher goals and a broader movement for women.

Zelda actively led and participated in NOW's activist efforts; predominantly in the fight for reproductive rights, legislative protection for victims of rape, sexual discrimination, the desegregation of local establishments, and the desegregation of employment ads in Richmond periodicals. Her advocacy on behalf of women grew throughout the next three decades, gaining her notoriety and the opportunity to become more involved in the movement. She served a position on the National Organization of Women's legislative task force on rape, the State Board, and eventually became the State Coordinator for the group in 1975. She also collaborated with groups including the Virginia League for Planned Parenthood, the Virginia Foundation for Women, the Women's International League for Peace and Freedom, the American Civil Liberties Union, the Women's Lobby of Virginia. Nordlinger was also involved in the National Women's Political Caucus. She lobbied the Virginia State Assembly for abortion and rape reform laws as well as for the ratification of the Equal Rights Amendment throughout her career.

== Controversial activism ==
Zelda Nordlinger spent a great amount of her later life organizing and participating in women's advocacy via protests, letter writing, speeches, lobbying, marches, and debates. One of Nordlinger's most notable and controversial accomplishments was her participation in a strike on August 26, 1970, carried out in conjunction with The National Women's Strike for Equality Day. On this day, Nordlinger along with three other female activists organized a sit-in protest at the local Thalhimers Department Store, with the goal of integrating of the male-only Thalhimers Soup Bar. Another one of Nordlinger's protests revolved around the sexual discrimination within employment ads in Richmond area periodicals. In this effort, Nordlinger handed out flyers and brochures decrying the discriminatory policies of these businesses, right outside the Richmond Times-Dispatch and News Leader Buildings. On October 12, 1971, Nordlinger provoked further controversy by speaking to the Fort Lee Officer's Wives Club about women's liberation at Camp Pickett. Nordlinger was asked to speak by the Program Chairman of the club, but her perceived radical views on the state of the military and domestic labor were met with a fury of objection. Individuals picketed her appearance, demonstrating their displeasure with having a feminist figure sharing her views. Among the protesters was Ruth Shuey, a journalist for a news periodical in Hopewell, who denounced Nordlinger's speech, stating, "Women's Liberation was set back ten years Tuesday, when Zelda K. Nordlinger of the National Organization for Women tangled with officers' wives at Fort Lee." Despite this public denouncement of her words, T.E. Ross, the Program Chair whom had invited Nordlinger to speak, thanked Nordlinger in a subsequent letter writing, "You woke many a stagnant mind and brought on a new surge of awareness to us."

== Legacy ==
Zelda Kingoff Nordlinger was an influential figure in women's rights advocacy in Richmond, and she achieved many successes. Nordlinger was responsible for catalyzing the first rape reform laws under Bill Axselle in Virginia, through her successful lobbying and revisions of state statutes in the 1970s. Her efforts resulted in improved protection for rape victims during trials, including the creation of a hotline and a task force tasked with staying with individuals during their trials, making the legislative process less daunting for victims of rape.

Throughout her career, Nordlinger kept a collection of advocacy newsletters, photographs, pamphlets, letters, thoughts, journals, press-releases, and other items related to her activism. This collection of over five-hundred personal articles was left to educational institutions throughout the region including Virginia Commonwealth University, the College of William and Mary, and The Library of Virginia. This contribution created the opportunity for the public to explore significant primary accounts of an influential leader in Richmond's history as well as the evolution of the Women's Rights Movement as a whole. In an interview conducted through Virginia Commonwealth University a year before her death, Nordlinger expressed her sentiments regarding the future of the movement, "I have an enduring faith that the evolution of this whole civilization all over the world has become part and parcel of the future for women and I don't see much hope that men are going to continue in the roles of war-makers. I see women taking a very vital part in calling the signals and I see a only good future for humankind as a result because I think the female influence is what's going to take us into the future."

== Publications ==
Zelda wrote "A Decade of Change for Women, Where Do We Go From Here," which was based on the many accomplishment of women over the decade from 1970 to 1980. Some of these accomplishments include: in 1970: The United States Senate holds the first Equal Rights Amendment hearing since 1956. In 1971: New York City bans sex discrimination in public accommodations. In 1972: Sally Priesand is ordained at the first female rabbi. In 1973: the Supreme Court legalized abortion. In 1974: the Supreme Court outlaws mandatory maternity leave for teachers, and women being admitted into the Merchant Marine Academy. In 1975: The Supreme Court outlaws automatic exclusion of women from jury duty. In 1976: NASA accepted Women for astronaut training for the first time. In 1978: More women than men enter college for the first time in American history. And in 1979: the Supreme Court ruled that a minor has the constitutional right to have an abortion.

== Personal life ==
Zelda Nordlinger was married to Martin Stanford Nordlinger throughout her later life and had four children: Samuel Andrew Markel II, Debra Margaret Markel, Joanne Nordlinger, and Sharon "Romy" Nordlinger. She was also the grandmother to seven grandchildren.
