= Flaco (owl) =

Owl that escaped from a New York City zoo (2010–2024)

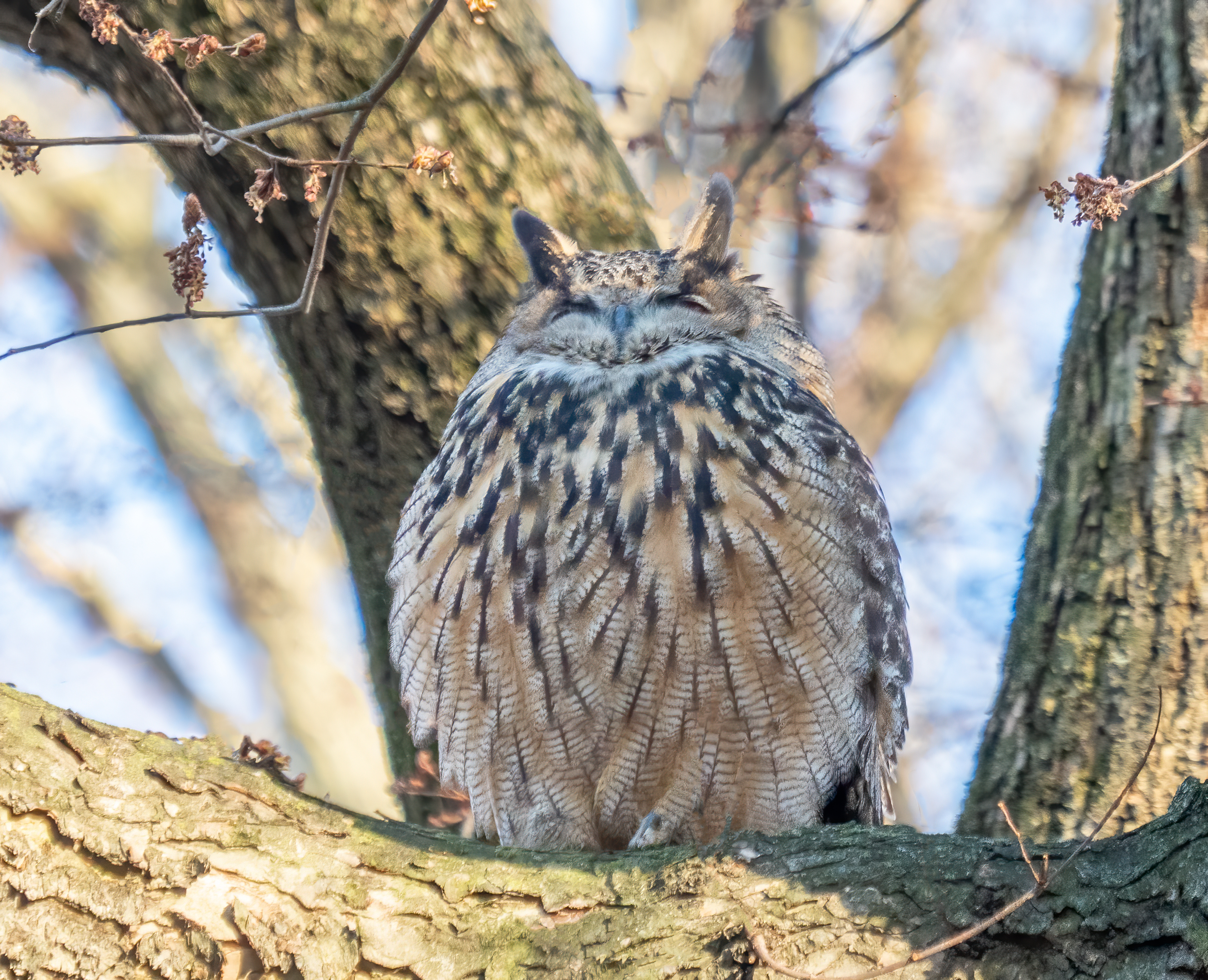
- Flaco roosting in Central Park
- Species: Eurasian eagle-owl
- Sex: Male
- Hatched: March 15, 2010; Scotland Neck, North Carolina, U.S.
- Died: February 23, 2024 (aged 13); Upper West Side, New York City, U.S.
- Known for: Escape from the Central Park Zoo
- Residence: Central Park

Flaco (March 15, 2010 – February 23, 2024) was a male Eurasian eagle-owl who escaped his long-time enclosure at Central Park Zoo in New York City after someone cut the protective netting in February 2023. Flaco subsequently resided in and around Central Park. His escape attracted significant public and press attention, especially as he was of a species not native to North America. There were concerns for his ability to feed himself after being captive for so long, since he had not previously needed to fly or hunt, but he was seen successfully catching and eating rats a week after his escape. Attempts to recapture Flaco failed, and a petition circulated advocating that he remain free. Zoo officials ceased attempts to recapture him once it became clear he was eating on a regular basis and his flying skills improved.

Though he was able to hunt, there were lingering concerns about potential dangers in the park, like rodenticide. He remained in Central Park for nine months, eventually wandering to nearby buildings and neighborhoods in Lower Manhattan. In February 2024, one year after his escape, Flaco died after colliding with a building in Manhattan's Upper West Side.

== Background ==
The Eurasian eagle-owl (Bubo bubo) is a species of eagle-owl that resides in much of Eurasia. It is one of the largest species of owl; males weigh from 1.2 to 3.2 kg (2.6 to 7.1 lb) and have a wingspan of 131–188 cm (4 ft 4 in – 6 ft 2 in). This bird has distinctive ear tufts, with upper parts that are mottled with darker blackish coloring and tawny. The wings and tail are barred, and the underparts are a variably hued buff, streaked with darker coloring. They are nocturnal predators, mostly eating small mammals such as rodents and rabbits, as well as occasional larger mammals and birds of varying sizes. They are found in many habitats, but are endemic to mountainous regions or other rocky areas, often those near varied woodland edge and shrubby areas with openings or wetlands to hunt a majority of their prey. Within their range, they have been known to live in city parks, but no part of their native range overlaps with North America.

Flaco was a male Eurasian eagle-owl who hatched in a North Carolina bird park in 2010 and was taken to the Central Park Zoo later the same year. He had lived in captivity there for more than 12 years at the time of his escape. His enclosure was about the size of a bus stop, according to Gothamist, with fake rocks, a few branches, and a painted backdrop. It was located in the Temperate Territory part of the zoo, near a theater and the Penguins and Sea Birds building.

== Escape and monitoring ==
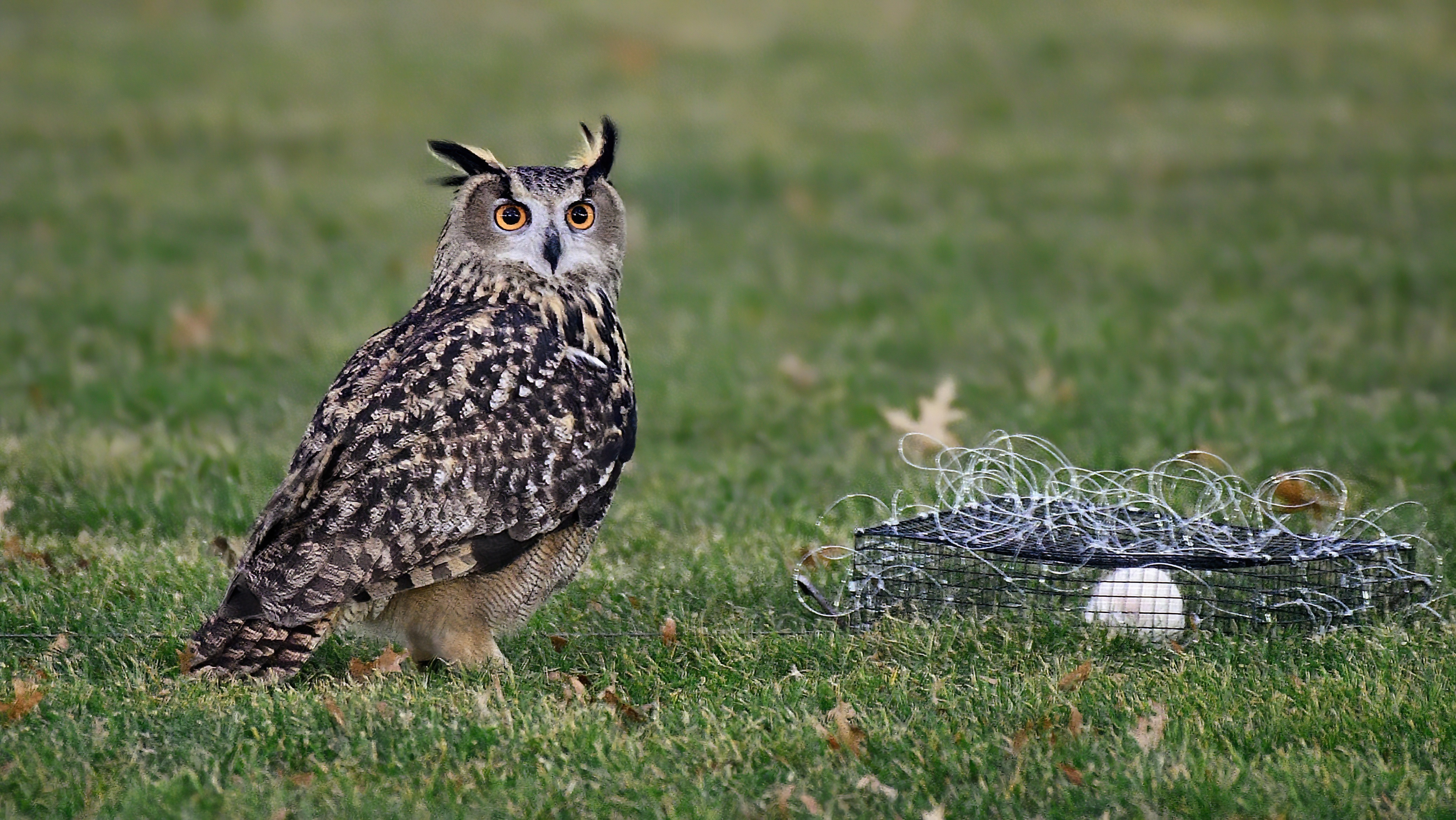
Moments before Flaco briefly got a talon stuck in a rat-baited bal-chatri trap zoo staff had used to try to recapture the owl, February 2023

On February 2, 2023, one or more people, who have not been caught, damaged Flaco's enclosure at the zoo. The owl escaped through a hole left by the vandals in the exhibit's stainless steel mesh, and zoo employees noticed he was gone at around 8:30 PM. Filmmaker Jeremy Workman was one of the first people to spot Flaco post-escape, taking several photos of the owl on Fifth Avenue in Manhattan. He shared the photos with his friend, filmmaker Penny Lane, who then posted the photos on social media. Prompted by the Wild Bird Fund, an Upper West Side wildlife rehabilitation hospital, NYPD officers unsuccessfully attempted to capture the owl soon thereafter near the Bergdorf Goodman Building on Fifth Avenue. The next day, he was found in a tree in the southern part of Central Park and spent his first days outside of captivity in various parts of the park, including the Hallett Nature Sanctuary, the area around the zoo, and the Central Park Zoo's crane enclosure.

=== Attempts to recapture ===
Soon after his escape, zoo staff began efforts to recapture Flaco, monitoring him for the first several days. Owls are generally difficult to capture; a typical strategy is to lure them with food. Zoo employees tried without success to bait Flaco with dead rats. The first attempt was with a bal-chatri trap, a baited trap covered in wire loops which snare a bird's talons when they try to get to the prey. It was placed on the park's Heckscher Ballfields, with zoo staff hidden nearby with nets. Flaco went for the rat and was briefly caught, but managed to free himself. Staff then tried using audio recordings of eagle-owl calls to attract him to other traps, again without success. The crowds which formed to look at Flaco may have contributed to his reluctance to take food from the zoo's traps. The employees were instructed not to speak to the press, but several anonymously expressed frustration and exhaustion in news reports.

=== Survival outside captivity ===
Local birders and zoo officials speculated that Flaco would have a difficult time surviving after such a long time in captivity, since he did not have reason to develop his flight and hunting skills in that time. A representative for the International Owl Center said his flying appeared to be unsteady, and that he "looked stressed" at first. There were no reports of him eating in his first several days after escape, but, on February 10, he was observed producing a pellet, a mass of undigested animal parts that owls regurgitate after eating. With the news that he had hunted successfully, some people who followed the story began to argue against efforts to return him to the zoo. Activists used the hashtag #freeflaco on social media and circulated a petition to the zoo. The Wildlife Conservation Society (WCS), the organization which runs the Central Park Zoo and other zoos in the area, released a statement on February 12 saying that its staff observed improved flight skills and saw Flaco successfully hunting and eating. With recapture less urgent to his survival, and concerned that aggressive methods might scare him to an area where he is either less able to take care of himself or less visible, WCS said zoo staff would scale back and redesign their efforts. Later the same week, after another attempt to use bait and eagle-owl calls failed, the WCS said they would stop trying to capture him and instead monitor his well-being, which they continued to do throughout the year.

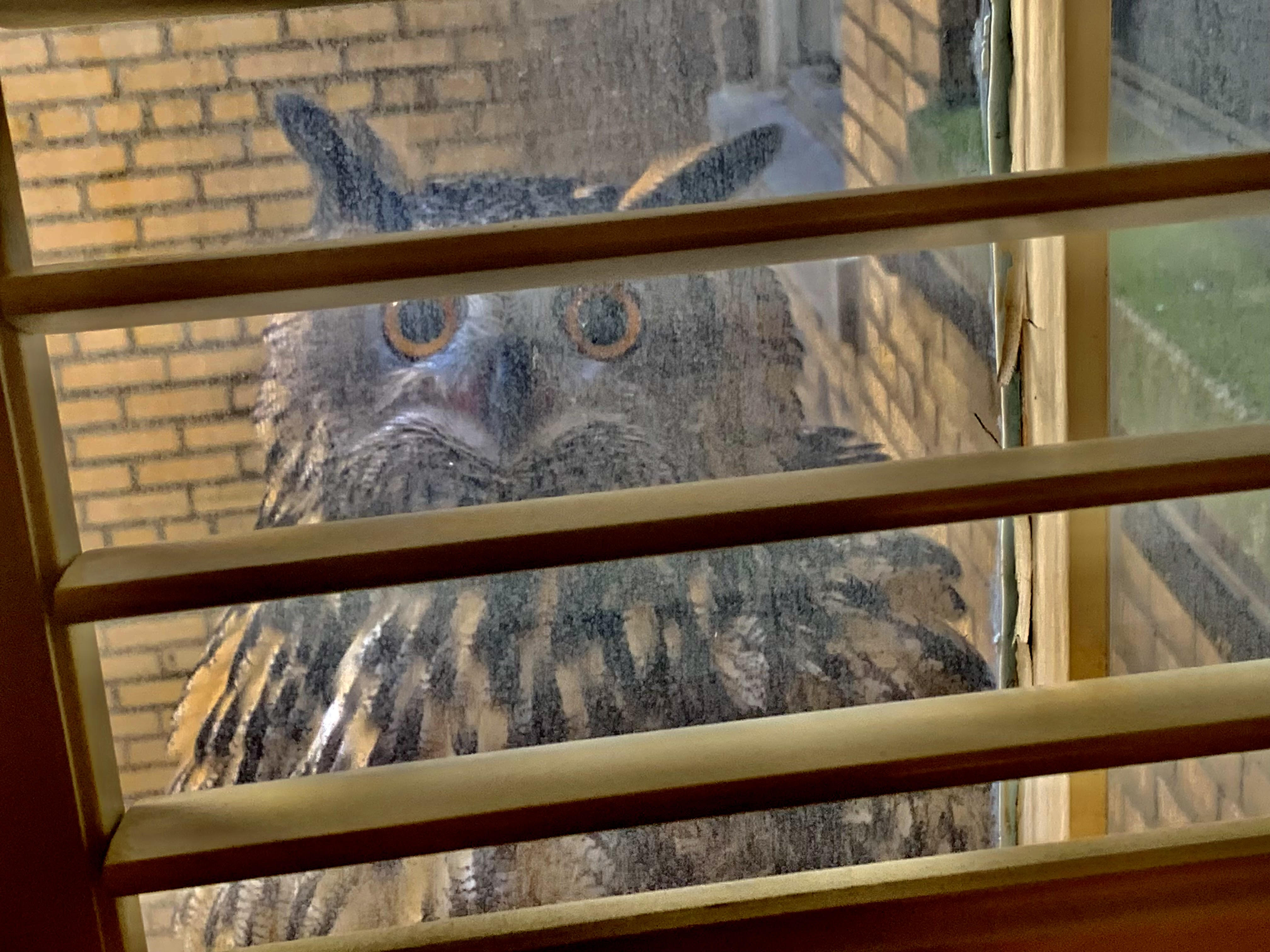
Flaco peering into playwright Nan Knighton's window in December 2023

In November 2023, Flaco ventured outside of Central Park for the first time since February. He was seen in a sculpture garden in the East Village neighborhood of Manhattan and, later, on the Lower East Side. Though his movement may have been triggered by the New York City Marathon or mobbing by crows, November is part of the breeding season for his species and he may have been looking for a mate. There are no wild Eurasian eagle-owls in the vicinity, but there are members of a similar species, great horned owls, including one named Geraldine who has frequented Central Park. He returned to the park after a week, but made additional forays outside, including several stops outside windows on city buildings. The Wall Street Journal described him as a "peeping tom" after Flaco was recorded multiple times staring through people's windows during this time, including the window of playwright Nan Knighton.

== Public attention ==
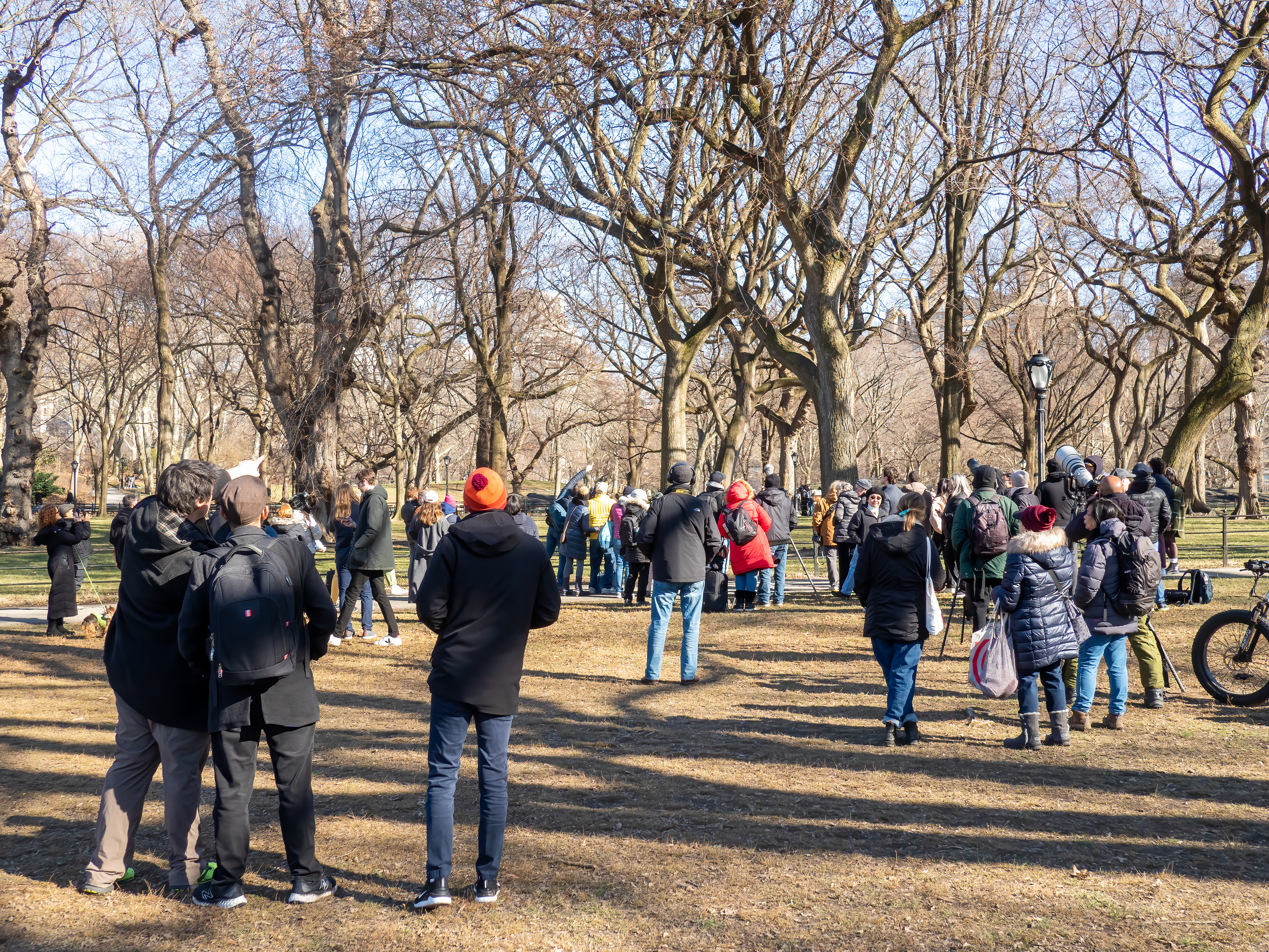
A crowd of photographers, birders, and other parkgoers watching Flaco in February 2023

Public attention to Flaco in Central Park quickly led to national news coverage and comparisons to other New York City "celebrity" birds like the mandarin duck seen in Central Park in 2018. Zeynep Tufekci of The New York Times dubbed Flaco "the Ultimate New Yorker". Many of the city's residents living in small apartments projected their desire for more space onto Flaco, others identified with his need to adapt to life in the city, and immigrants saw in Flaco a similar struggle to their own. The New York Times' Ed Shanahan described Flaco as an underdog people wanted to root for and "a feathered feel-good figure in troubled times". Writer and literary critic Michiko Kakutani framed Flaco as a distinctly American story: an "outlaw-hero" who succeeded in "writing a second act to his life". Juliana Kim of NPR wrote that, "over time, Flaco became a sort of symbol for freedom and resilience".

Flaco became a tourist attraction and a site for people to socialize. Defector wrote that "friendships and romances were forged at the foot of Flaco's trees". An article in the French newspaper Le Monde said Flaco was "worth the journey", with a backstory "worthy of a Walt Disney screenplay." A number of artists painted murals of Flaco, poets wrote poems about him, musicians wrote songs about him, and some people got tattoos of his likeness.

Zoo officials and some other birders criticized the sharing of the bird's location on social media. Publicly sharing the location of owls is a controversial practice among birders, particularly in New York City. Owls like Flaco are nocturnal hunters and roost during the day, when crowds of people can disturb their ability to rest, especially those who do not follow standard ethical guidelines for birdwatching, for example getting too close or making loud sounds to get a bird's attention for a photograph. The large number of people may have made him more conspicuous to potential prey or to birds prone to mobbing behavior, interfering with his ability to hunt or rest.

== Safety concerns and death ==
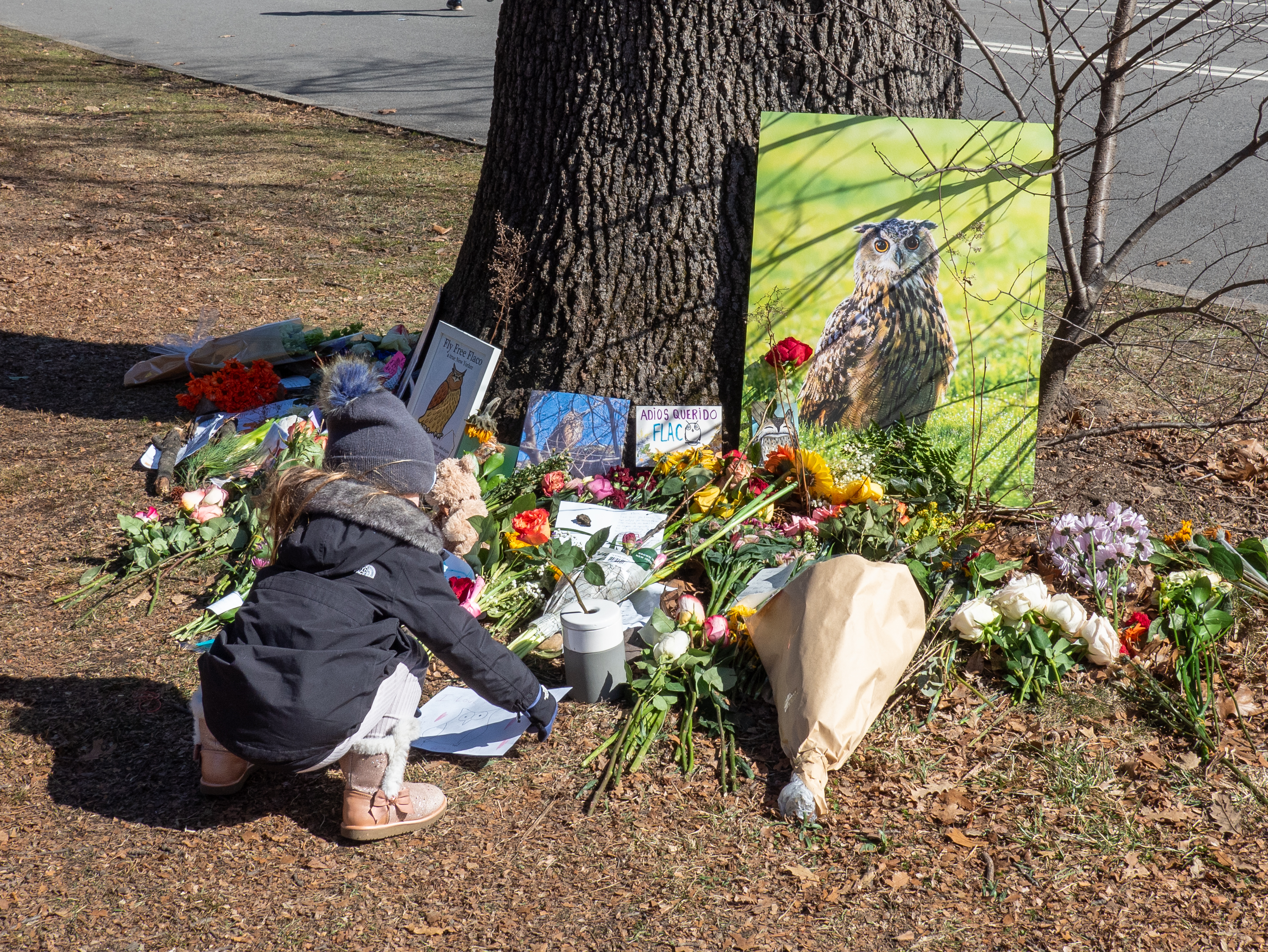
A child places a drawing of Flaco at a memorial under a tree he frequently roosted in

Although Flaco successfully hunted, living in Central Park has other risks like vehicular traffic, rodenticide, and window collision. In 2021, when another Eurasian eagle-owl escaped from a zoo in Minnesota, it was killed in a road accident two weeks later. Rats are plentiful prey, and the prevalent use of rat poison in the city has made poisoning a common cause of death for raptors. Another owl, a barred owl known as Barry, was killed in the park in 2021 when she collided with a maintenance vehicle, perhaps affected by the quantity of rat poison inside her. The Central Park Conservancy, the organization which runs the park, has said it was not using rat poison, but rodenticide is still in use in the surrounding area. Flaco's forays outside the park starting in November 2023 renewed fears of rodenticide and vehicles, both of which are more common in other parts of the city. In "What Should Be Done About Flaco, the Eurasian Eagle-Owl Loose in New York?", an article published by National Audubon Society, the author argued for consideration not just for Flaco's well-being, but also that of native species of birds he could eat. Another Audubon representative told Slate that there was also a chance for Flaco's celebrity status to have a positive influence on other birds, since he is an example of "charismatic megafauna" which could inspire people to consider other wildlife.

On February 23, 2024, Flaco was found on the ground on West 89th Street, seriously injured. Staff members from the nearby Wild Bird Fund, alerted by residents, came to assist. Flaco was pronounced dead shortly thereafter. Wild Bird Fund staff reported injuries on his chest and right eye. He was found to have collided with the building, sustaining injuries either from the collision or impact with the ground. A necropsy conducted by the Bronx Zoo revealed both harmful levels of rat poison and pigeon herpesvirus in Flaco's system as a result of eating poisoned rats and feral pigeons. The viral infection caused extensive damage and inflammation of several internal organs, weakening him and thus making him more susceptible to a building collision. According to the WCS, these conditions were severe enough to be fatal even without such a collision.

== Legacy ==
Following his death, people began leaving photos, cards, and other mementos under an oak tree Flaco frequently roosted in. Hundreds of followers gathered for a memorial service at the tree, during which attendees eulogized, sang, and read letters and poems. Flaco's remains were donated to the American Museum of Natural History, which sits just west of Central Park.

Flaco's death brought additional scrutiny to the issue of building standards for windows that reduce the likelihood of bird collisions and deaths. New York City itself set tough standards in 2019. A bill in the New York Legislature to require more bird-friendly design in buildings statewide, originally introduced by state senator Brad Hoylman-Sigal, was renamed the FLACO Act shortly after Flaco's death. In April 2024, New York City Council member Shaun Abreu introduced three bills named after Flaco, which dealt with rat contraception, bird-friendly building design, and reductions in light pollution. The rat contraceptive pilot program, an effort to control rat populations without using poison, was enacted in October 2024 and went into effect in April 2025.

In the episode of Saturday Night Live following the announcement of the necropsy results, Sarah Sherman portrayed Flaco's widow for a bit during Weekend Update.

The New York Historical organized an exhibit called "The Year of Flaco" which opened in February 2025. The organization received an exhibition pitch from locals who had followed Flaco and collected memorabilia, and moved quickly to coincide with the anniversary of his death. According to its curator of material culture, Flaco is "such a flexible symbol"; "people see all these things in him – a New Yorker who had grit, an immigrant – and he was liberated, he was free. That idea was very potent for people."

In 2026, a documentary film Wild Inside directed by Penny Lane revolving around Flaco was released theatrically in July 2026, with an HBO broadcast to follow.

=== Books about Flaco ===
- Finding Flaco, Our Year with New York City's Beloved Owl, by Jacqueline Emery and David Lei
- The Book of Flaco: The World's Most Famous Bird, by David Gessner
- Free Bird: Flaco the Owl’s Dreams Take Flight, by Christine Mott

== See also ==
- Birding in New York City
- Gladys (owl)
- Light pollution
- List of individual birds
