= Mist net =

Net used to capture wild birds or bats

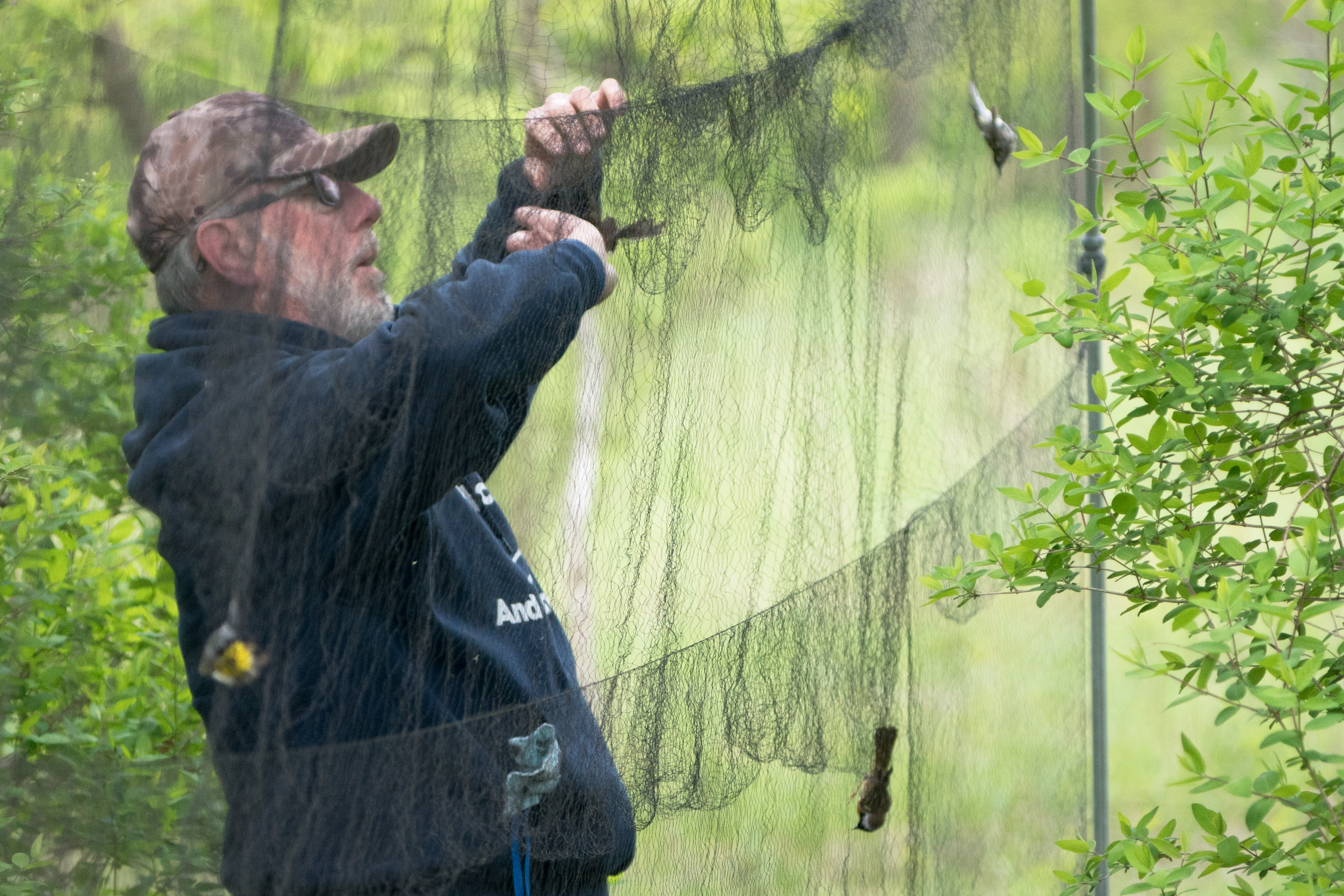
A researcher removes a bird from a mist net.

Mist nets are vertically suspended nets used as a trapping implement to intercept and entangle flying wild animals such as birds and bats. They are used by hunters and poachers to catch game birds, but also by ornithologists and chiropterologists for veterinary banding and other scientific research projects.

Mist nets are typically made of thin nylon or polyester mesh suspended between two poles, resembling a volleyball or badminton net. When properly deployed, they can blend into the surrounding environment and become virtually invisible from afar. The nets have shelves created by horizontally strung lines that create a loose, baggy pocket. When a flying animal hits the net, it falls into this pocket, where it becomes tangled. The mesh size of the netting varies according to the size of the species targeted for capture. Mesh sizes can be measured along one side of the edge of a single mesh square, or along the diagonal of that square. Measures given here are along the diagonal. Small passerines are typically captured with 16-30 mm mesh, while larger birds, like hawks and ducks, are captured using mesh sizes of ~127 mm. Net dimensions can vary widely depending on the proposed use. Net height for avian mist netting is typically 1.2 - 2.6 m. Net width may vary from 3 to 18 m, although longer nets may also be used. A dho-gazza is a type of mist net that can be used for larger birds, such as raptors. This net lacks shelves.

The purchase and use of mist nets requires permits, which vary according to a country or state's hunting regulations. Mist net handling requires skill for optimal placement, avoiding entangling nets in vegetation, and proper storage. Bird and bat handling requires extensive training to avoid injury to the captured animals. Bat handling may be especially difficult since bats are captured at night and may bite during struggle. A 2011 research survey found mist netting to result in low rates of injury while providing high scientific value.

== Usage of mist nets ==
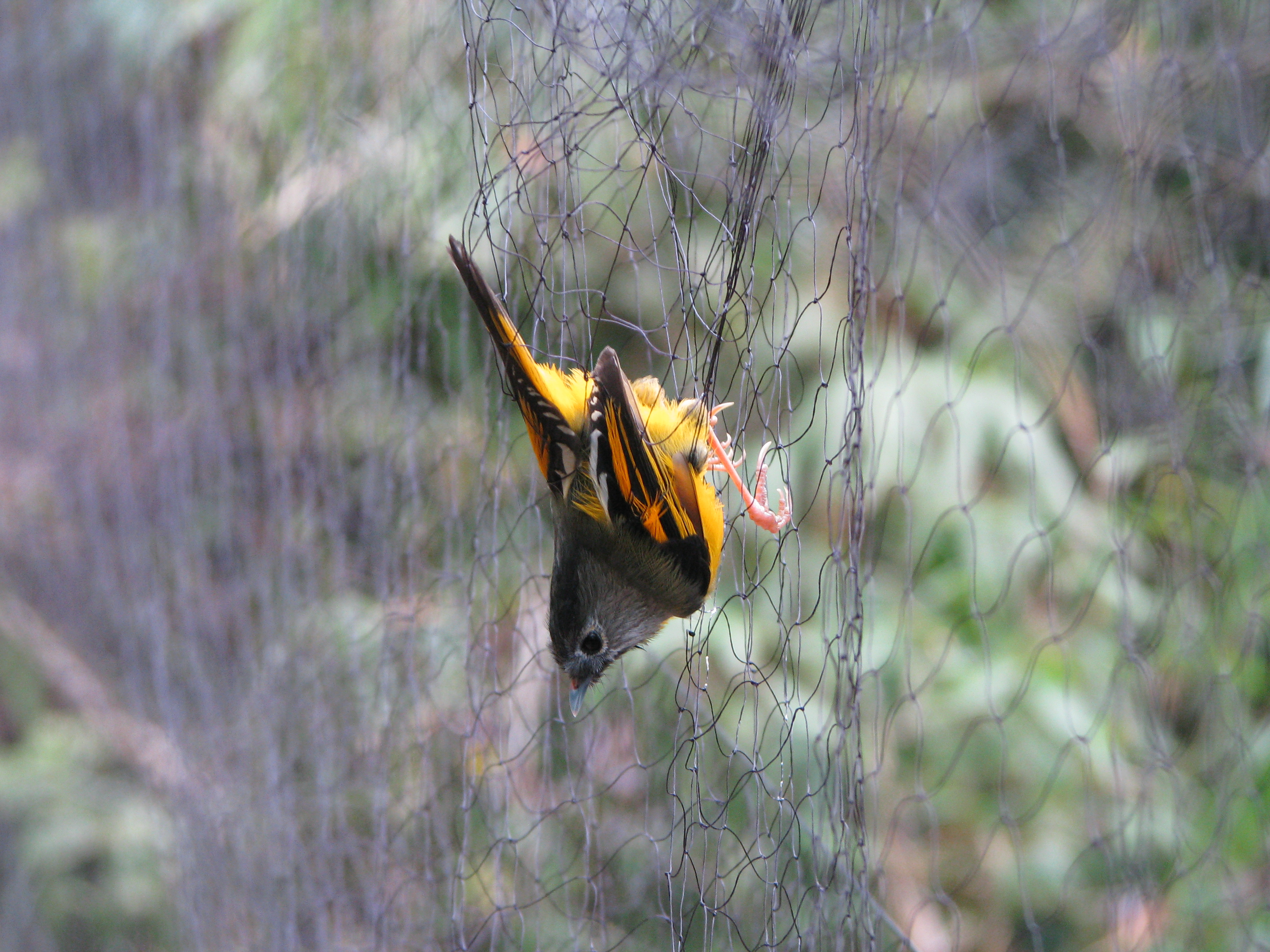
A small passerine captured in a mist net

Mist nets have been used by Japanese hunters for nearly 300 years to capture birds. They were first introduced into use for ornithology in the United States of America by Oliver L. Austin in 1947.

Mist netting is a popular and important tool for monitoring species diversity, relative abundance, population size, and demography. Mist nets are primarily utilized in two ways: target netting of specific species or individuals, and broadcast netting of all birds within a particular area. Targeted netting is typically used for scientific studies that examine a single species. Nets deployed in this manner often use a playback of a species' song or call, or a model of that species placed near the net to lure the targeted individuals into the net (e.g. ).

Because broadcast netting captures birds indiscriminately, this technique is better suited to examining the species that occur within a specific habitat. Bird banding stations throughout the United States use this method. Typically, such stations collect a set of standard measurements from each individual, including mass, wing chord, breeding status, body fat index, sex, age, and molt status.

Although setting up mist nets is time-consuming and requires certification, they have certain advantages compared to visual and aural monitoring techniques, such as sampling species that may be poorly detected in other ways. It also allows easy standardization, hands-on examination, and reduces misidentification of species. Because they allow scientists to examine species up close, mist nets are often used in mark-recapture studies over extended periods of time to detect trends in population indices.

Some uses of data collected using mist net sampling are:

- Mark-recapture for population sampling
- Humane capture and relocation of small birds or bats
- Tagging and tracking
- Testing health of bird or bat species and for ectoparasite studies
- Examination of avian phenology in response to climatic and other variables
- Examination of patterns of molt

Because there is still debate as to whether or not these techniques provide precise data, it is suggested that mist netting be used as a supplement to aural and visual methods of observation.

One of the main disadvantages of mist nets is that the numbers captured may only represent a small proportion of the true population size. Mist netting is a unique method in that it provides demographic estimates throughout all seasons, and offers valuable guides to relative abundance of certain species or birds and/or bats.

== Example study ==
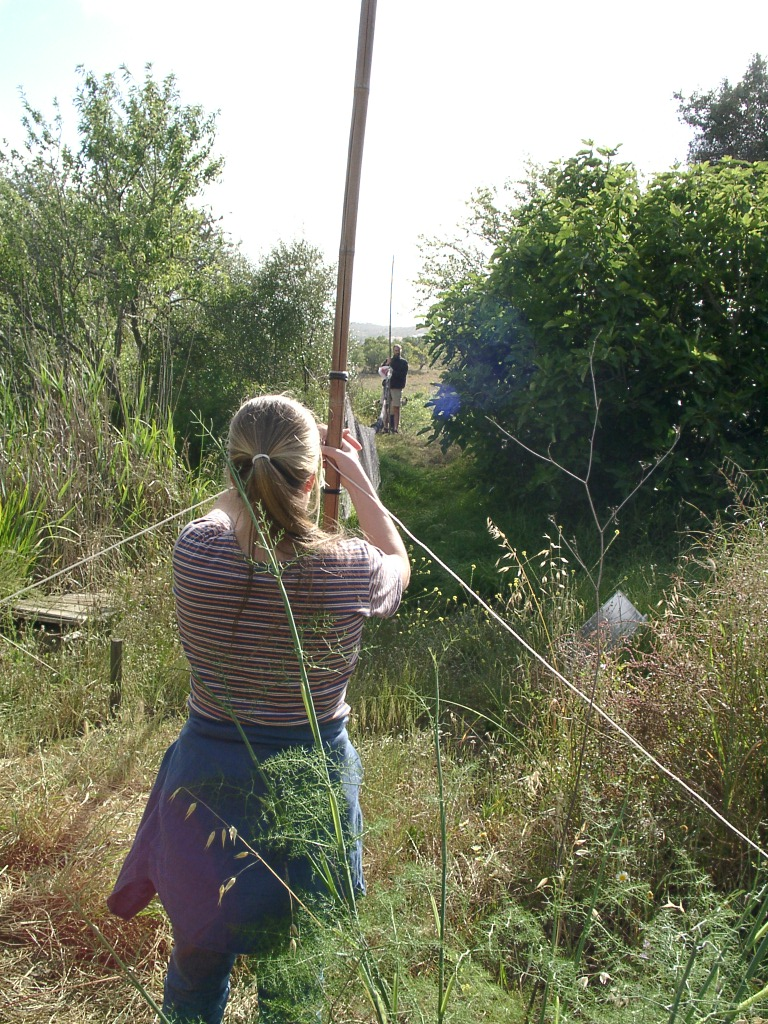
A mist net being set up

Mist nets can be important tools for collecting data to reveal critical ecological conditions in a variety of situations. This summarized study, "Effects of forest fragmentation on Amazonian understory bird communities" by Richard O. Bierregaard and Thomas E. Lovejoy, used mist nets to analyze the effects of forest fragmentation on understory bird communities in terra firme forest of Central Amazon.

Data from intensive mist netting mark-recapture programs on understory birds from isolated forest reserves were compared to pre-isolation data from the same reserves to investigate changes related to isolation from continuous forest. Birds surveyed were from a variety of ecological guilds, including nectivores, insectivores, frugivores, obligatory army ant followers, forest edge specialists and flocking species. Periodic sampling by the mist netting capture program provided the quantitative basis for this project. Reserves of varied sizes (1 and 10 hectare) within the Biological Dynamics of Forest Fragments project site were sampled with transects of tethered mist nets once every three or four weeks. Capture rates from isolated reserves were compared to pre-isolation rates to measure changes in population size and/or avian activity due to isolation. Data was analyzed in the following ways: capture rates per net hour as a function of time since isolation, percent recapture as a function of time since isolation, abundance distribution of species against the species rank by abundance, percent individuals banded according to species and feeding strategy, and finally, capture rates per net hour in isolated reserves against capture rates per net hour in continuous forests. A summary of the results and discussion as stated by Bierregaard and Lovejoy is as follows:

...changes in the understory avian community in isolated patches. Following isolation, capture rates increase significantly as birds fleeing the felled forest entered new forest fragments. Movement to and from the reserve is limited as witnessed by an increase in recapture percentages following isolation. Species of birds that are obligate army ant followers disappeared at the time the surrounding habitat was removed from 1 and 10 ha areas. The complex mixed-species of insectivorous flocks typical of Amazonian forests deteriorated within 2 years of isolation of 1 and 10 ha forest fragments. Several species of mid-story insectivores changed their foraging behavior after isolation of small forest reserves.

These data were collected using mist nets. Data from mist netting efforts may be used to gain a greater understanding of ecological effects of factors impacting ecosystems, such human activities or environmental changes. This is just one example of the use of mist nets as a tool for ecological and biological sciences. Mist net data can also have ecosystem management implications.

== Disadvantages ==
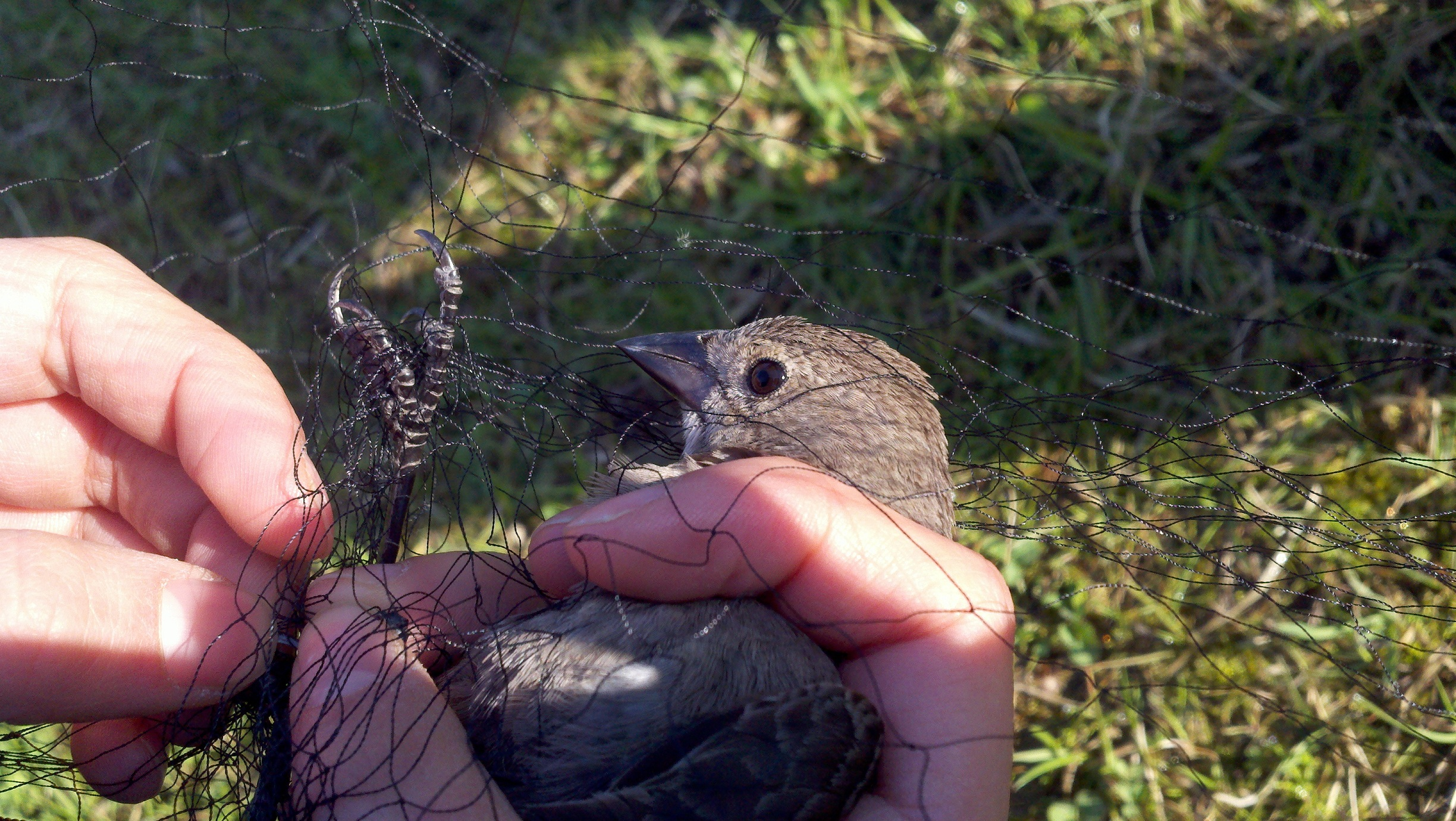
A female brown-headed cowbird being removed from a mist net.

The use of mist nets has several disadvantages. Mist-netting is very time-consuming. Nets have to be set up without mistakes. An animal caught in a mist net becomes entangled, so the net must be checked often and the animal removed promptly. Disentangling an animal from a mist net can be difficult and must be done carefully by trained personnel. If an animal is heavily entangled, the mist net may need to be cut to avoid injuring the animal, damaging the material.

Mist nets will not capture birds in direct proportion to their presence in the area (Remsen and Good 1996) and can miss a species completely if it is active in a different strata of vegetation, such as high in the canopy. They can, however, provide an index to population size.

People using mist nets must be careful and well-trained, since the capture process can harm birds. One study found the average rate of injury for birds in mist nets is between 0 and 0.59% while the average mortality rate is between 0 and 0.23%.

While rare, it has been suggested (without scientific studies) that larger birds may be more prone to leg injuries and internal bleeding. Smaller birds typically have problems with tangling issues and wing injuries. Factors that affect the injury and mortality rate are human error while handling the species, time of year caught, time of day caught, predators in the area, and size/material of the mist net.

== Banders ==
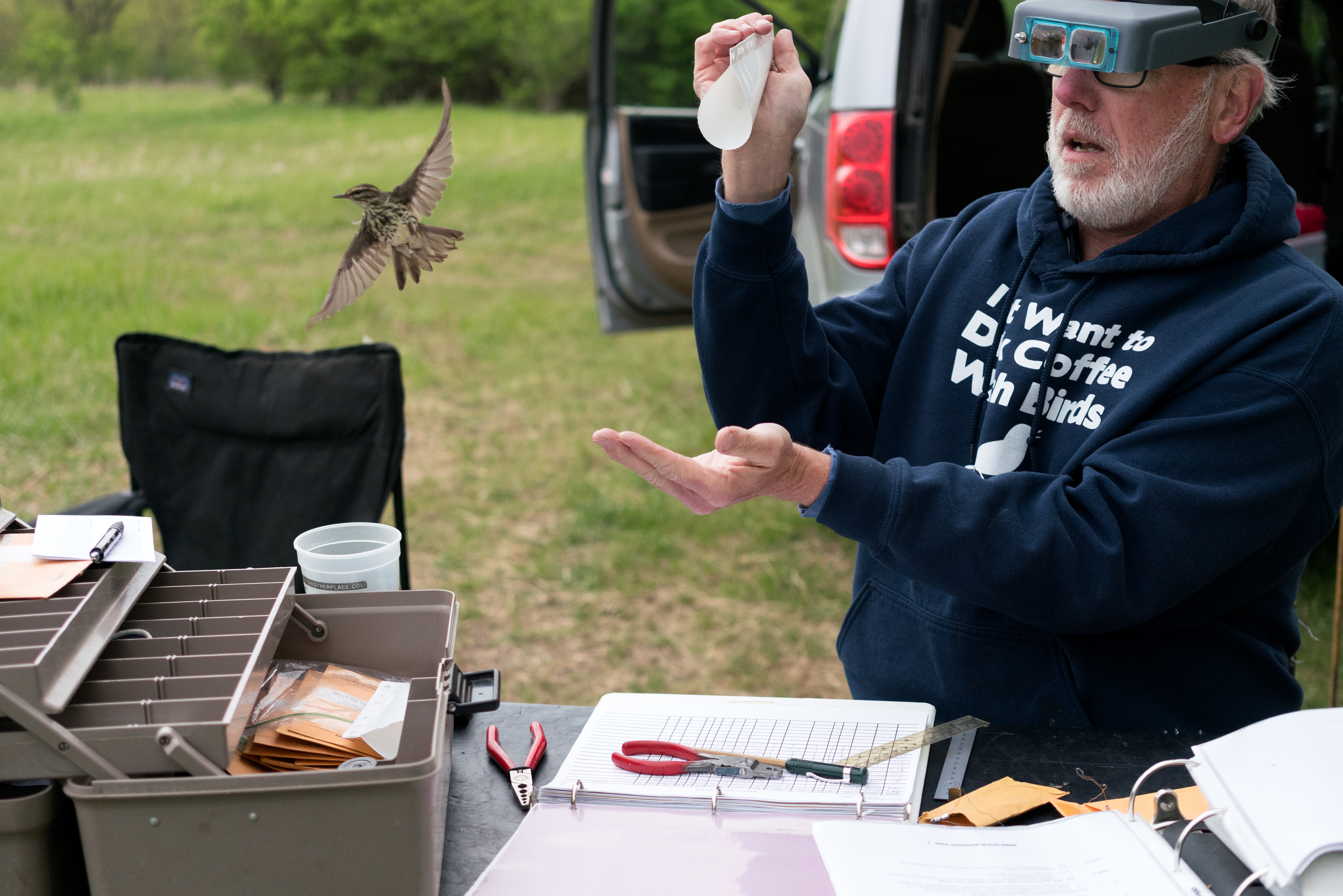
A researcher releases a newly banded northern waterthrush

People who are responsible for banding netted wildlife so they can be tracked are called banders in the United States. Banders are responsible for the animals caught and thus apply their training by looking for stress cues (for birds, these include panting, tiredness, closing of eyes, and raising of feathers). Without this caution, animals can severely injure themselves.

In the United States, in order to band a bird or bat, one must have a banding permit from U.S. Fish and Wildlife. The qualifications for permitting vary by species. There are different types of banding permits for birds: the Master Permit and the Sub permit. Master Permits are given to individuals who band on their own or who supervise banding operations. Sub Permits are given to individuals who will be supervised while banding by a person with a Master Permit. In order to receive a permit, one must complete an application and return it to the nearest banding office. Banders must ask for special authorization in their application to use mist nets, cannon nets, chemicals, or auxiliary markers.

== See also ==
- Bal-chatri traps to catch birds of prey (raptors)
