= That Quail, Robert =

Book written by Margaret A. Stanger

- Author: Margaret A. Stanger
- Illustrator: Cathy Baldwin
- Language: English
- Published: 1966
- Publisher: J. B. Lippincott & Co.
- Publication place: United States of America
- ISBN: 0397004516

That Quail, Robert is a book by Margaret A. Stanger, illustrated by Cathy Baldwin. Published on August 15, 1966, it details the true story of Robert, a domesticated northern bobwhite raised by a Cape Cod family. Through mentions in local media and an appearance by the author on a television game show, Robert became somewhat of a minor celebrity. Stanger's biography achieved international renown and the book became a best seller.

== Synopsis ==
On July 11, 1962, retired couple, Dr. Thomas and Mildred Kienzle, discover an unhatched egg in an abandoned quail nest on their property in Orleans, Massachusetts. They take the egg home as a curiosity and are surprised to find it moving. Setting it next to a warm lamp, the egg hatches and out tumbles the tiny chick, whom they name Bobby White (promptly revised to Robert by the Kienzles' close friend, author Margaret A. Stanger). Robert quickly settles into the household, developing a strong bond with Tommy and Mildred. After a few months, The Kienzles attempt to release Robert back into the wild but are unsuccessful, Robert instead preferring the companionship and comfort of the Kienzle household.

The Kienzles approach Wallace Bailey, director of the Wellfleet Bay Wildlife Sanctuary, for advice concerning Robert's well-being and future. Bailey suggests that Robert be banded and that the Kienzles continue to care for the little bird. The Kienzles adjust to a new life with Robert in their charge, enjoying meals at the dining room table and excursions into the yard, entertaining visitors fascinated by the story of a quail who prefers the company of people to birds, chirps into the telephone and sleeps on a favourite red pillbox hat. Robert and the family experience the first snowfall of the year and a Christmas visit from the Kienzles' family (Robert being particularly fascinated by a nativity display but decidedly unimpressed with their exuberant grandchildren).

In the spring, the Kienzles consider that Robert might experience a strong mating instinct, and prepare for the possibility of Robert leaving the 'nest'. But Robert, listless and moulting, surprises the family by laying an egg at Tommy's feet, an event noted in local media. A change of name to 'Roberta' is considered but quickly abandoned; she remains Robert.

Early that summer, the Kienzles contemplate a long-planned European holiday. Concerned for the effect of their absence on Robert and considering cancelling their travel plans, their close friend Margaret volunteers to host Robert in her home for the duration. Margaret sets about preparing for Robert's arrival, enlisting a local builder to construct an enclosed patio. Margaret cares for Robert for ninety-six days, experiencing the joys and peculiarities of life with the unusual quail and entertaining a constant influx of visitors, many of whom sign Robert's growing guest book. The Kienzles return from abroad to a happy reunion with Robert.

In February, 1964, Margaret receives a call from a program arranger with NBC, inquiring whether Robert would be available to appear on the television game show Missing Links. Concerned with the health effects of the harsh studio lighting on the tiny bird, Margaret and the Kienzles decline the invitation on Robert's behalf, but agree to the suggestion that Margaret appear on the program instead. The national broadcast greatly increases Robert's fame; letters addressed to "Robert the Quail, Orleans, Mass." pour in from across the country.

Robert continues her happy life with the Kienzles, rebuffing amorous overtures from male quail suitors, entertaining guests and family members, along with the occasional misadventure (swallowing a diamond, disrupting a dinner party with an impromptu bath in dish of buttered broccoli). In December 1965, after a period of declining health, Robert falls asleep and passes away peacefully in the Kienzles' home; she is laid to rest in a favoured spot in Margaret's patio, watched over by a pair of carved stone quail from Japan.

== Reception and legacy ==
Critical reception of the book was generally positive, and it met with immediate success. By November 1966, publisher J. B. Lippincott & Co. had sold 46000 hardcovers over eight printings. That Quail, Robert appeared on The New York Times best-seller list, and was nominated for the 1968 William Allen White Children's Book Award. The book was published in German and Dutch translations. That Quail, Robert remains a beloved classic, and did much to secure Margaret Stanger's place amongst the Cape Cod literati; a 2015 history of Cape Cod notes that "(f)or a long while, Margaret Stanger's contribution to Cape Cod's literary scene was tantamount to what Mark Twain's means to the Mississippi River or Willa Cather's on the Great Plains."
