= Gladys (owl) =

Owl that escaped from a Minnesota zoo (2016–2021)

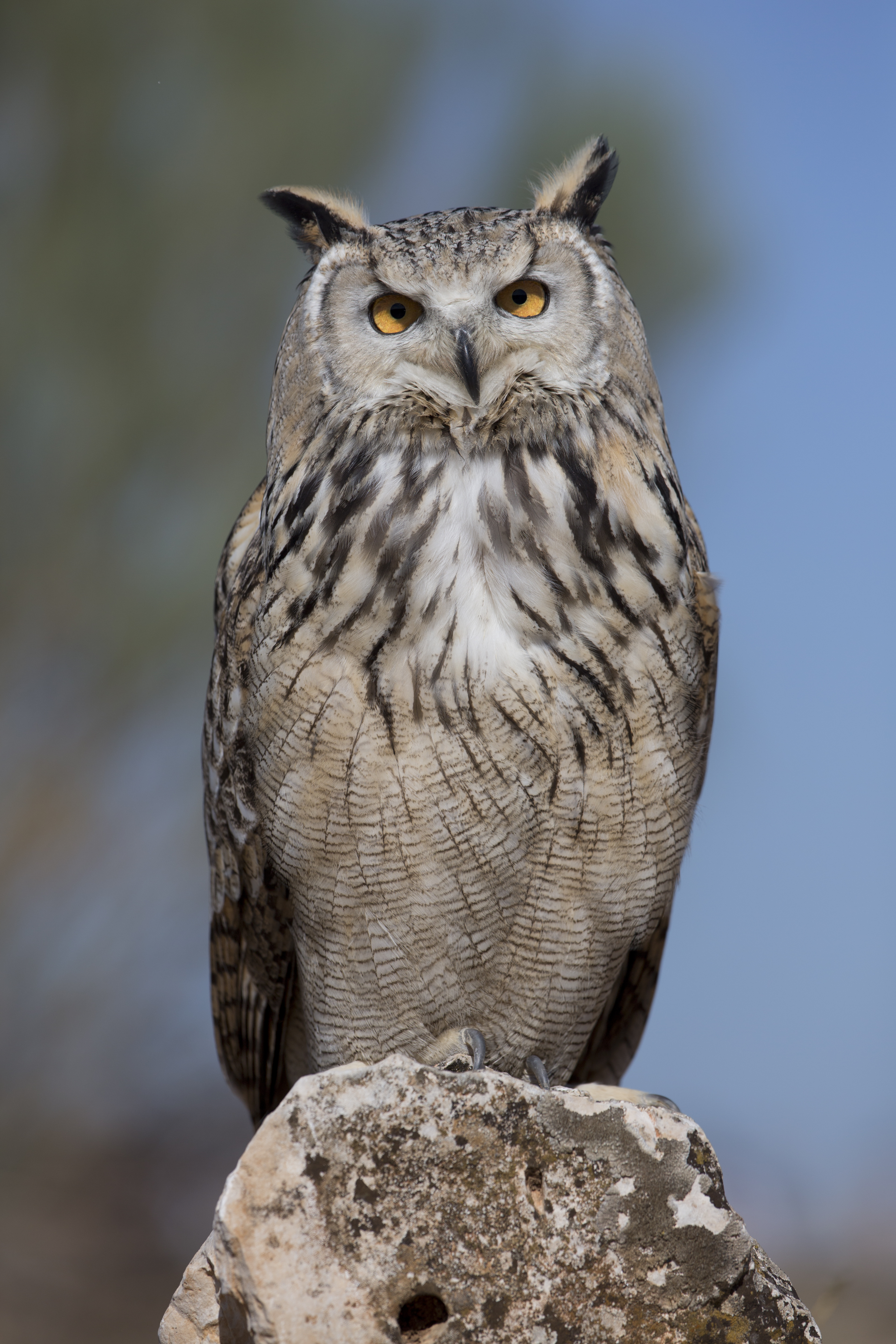
Gladys the Eurasian eagle owl, 2020

Gladys (2016 – October 14, 2021) was a female Eurasian eagle-owl who escaped after flying off into a tree during a routine exercise and training session at the Minnesota Zoo in Apple Valley, Minnesota in October 2021.

== Background ==
The Eurasian eagle-owl (Bubo bubo) is a species of eagle-owl that inhabits various regions across Eurasia. Known for its large size, males can weigh between 1.2 to 3.2 kg (2.6 to 7.1 lb) with a wingspan ranging from 131–188 cm (4 ft 4 in – 6 ft 2 in). This owl features distinctive ear tufts, mottled upper parts with dark blackish and tawny coloring, barred wings and tail, and variably hued buff underparts streaked with darker shades. Primarily nocturnal predators, they feed on small mammals like rodents and rabbits, along with occasional larger prey. This species thrives in diverse habitats, particularly mountainous or rocky areas near woodland edges, shrubby regions, and wetlands where they hunt for their prey. While they have been observed in city parks and suburbs, they are not native to North America.

Gladys was a member of the Minnesota Zoo's bird show, known as the ambassador of her species. Raised from a chick, the zoo staff worked with her daily.

== Escape and monitoring ==
During a routine exercise and training session on October 1, 2021, Gladys flew off into a tree. Initially staying close by, she gradually wandered further away, Zoo staff tracked her movements through various trees on the zoo property. Despite efforts to locate her, sightings became sporadic, leading zoo officials to seek help from neighbors in keeping an eye out for her.

Minnesota's cold seasons were not a concern for its short term survival as Eurasian eagle-owls can survive in cold climates. While Gladys did not seem to pose a threat to people, there was a possibility that people may pose a threat to her.

== Death ==
The 5-year-old owl was found injured on the side of the road on the morning of October 14, 2021, two weeks after she went missing. Gladys died before the zoo staff could provide treatment. The injuries indicated that the cause of her death was likely due to an impact, possibly involving a vehicle.

== Legacy ==
Former A Prairie Home Companion host and author Garrison Keillor compared Gladys' escape and that of the Central Park Zoo in New York City eagle-owl, Flaco years later in an essay about captivity demanded relationships and nature of love and need.

== See also ==
- List of individual birds
- Flaco (owl)
- Barry (owl)
