= Wild Inside =

2026 American documentary film

- Theatrical release poster
- Directed by: Penny Lane
- Produced by: Gabriel Sedgwick; Nickolas Hasse
- Cinematography: Naiti Gamez
- Edited by: Hannah Buck
- Music by: Carolina Eyck
- Production companies: HBO Documentary Films; Sandbox Films; Spinning Nancy
- Distributed by: Sandbox Films
- Release dates: July 29, 2026 (Rooftop Films); July 31, 2026 (United States)
- Running time: 95 minutes
- Country: United States
- Language: English
- Box office: $256,246

Wild Inside is a 2026 American documentary film directed by Penny Lane. It follows Flaco, a male Eurasian eagle-owl who escapes Central Park Zoo in 2023, gaining fame for his adventures.

The film was released by Sandbox Films and had its world premiere at Rooftop Films on July 29, 2026, followed by its debut in theaters on July 31 at Manhattan's IFC Center.

== Premise ==
Flaco, a male Eurasian eagle-owl who escapes Central Park Zoo in 2023, gaining fame for his adventures.

== Production ==
In March 2025, it was announced Penny Lane would direct a documentary revolving around Flaco with HBO Documentary Films set to produce and distribute alongside Sandbox Films. Footage of Flaco included in the film was crowd-sourced from birdwatchers.

== Release ==
It had its world premiere at Rooftop Films in Central Park on July 29, 2026. In May 2026, Sandbox Films was announced to theatrically distribute the film setting a July 31, 2026, release.

== Reception ==
On the review aggregator website Rotten Tomatoes, 100% of 27 critics' reviews are positive, with an average rating of 8.1/10. Metacritic, which uses a weighted average, assigned the film a score of 89 out of 100, based on 6 critics, indicating "universal acclaim".

Christopher Reed of Hammer to Nail praised the film, writing: "But Lane, as in all her films, refuses the straightforward path. She asks much more of her audience than just one reaction, to the great benefit of her movie and to the enduring honor of Flaco."
