= Oliver L. Austin =

American ornithologist

Oliver Luther Austin Jr. (May 24, 1903 – December 31, 1988) was an ornithologist who wrote the definitive study Birds of the World, eventually published in seven languages. At various times he was Director of the Austin Ornithological Research Center in Wellfleet, Massachusetts, Professor of Zoology at Air University and Curator of Ornithology at the Florida Museum of Natural History. At the time of his death, he was Curator Emeritus.

In 1931 he was elected to the American Ornithologists' Union and was the editor of their journal The Auk from 1968 to 1977. Austin also served as editor of the Bulletin of the Florida State Museum, a publication of the Florida Museum of Natural History.

Austin grew up in Mt. Vernon, New York and attended A. B. Davis High School and the Berkshire School. While in high school he was a member of the orchestra, glee club and the Rho Chapter of the Omega Gamma Delta Fraternity and played football. He was a graduate of Wesleyan University, where he was a member of the Phi Nu Theta (Eclectic) Fraternity. He earned his PhD from Harvard University. After serving in the US Navy in World War II he went to Japan. He worked there in the Allied Military Government for Occupied Territories.

Austin was married to author and ornithologist Elizabeth S. Austin who also authored several birding books of her own. Oliver Austin co-authored The Random House Book of Birds with his wife, which was published in 1970.

In addition to Birds of the World, among his nine books, he wrote famous studies of birds in both Japan and the Republic of Korea. After Austin's death, a collection of his notes, illustrations and a number of early drafts of his book, Birds of the World, were donated to the University of Florida George A. Smathers Libraries. After Austin's death, the Wellfleet land was purchased by the Massachusetts Audubon Society, which established the Wellfleet Bay Wildlife Sanctuary on the site. Austin was responsible for introducing mist netting into ornithology by modification of techniques used by traditional Japanese trappers.

== Publications ==
- Austin, Oliver L. (1948) The Birds of Korea. Bulletin of the Museum of Comparative Zoölogy at Harvard College.
- Austin, Oliver L. (1953) The Birds of Japan, their status and distribution. Bulletin of the Museum of Comparative Zoölogy at Harvard College.
- Austin, Oliver L. (1961) Birds of the World: Birds of the world; a survey of the twenty-seven orders and one hundred and fifty-five families. Illustrated by * * Arthur Singer. Edited by Herbert S. Zim, New York, Golden Press; 1st Edition
- Austin, Oliver L. (1978) University of Florida Oral History Project. http://ufdc.ufl.edu/UF00005958/00001/1j
