= Barry (owl) =

Female barred owl in Central Park, New York City

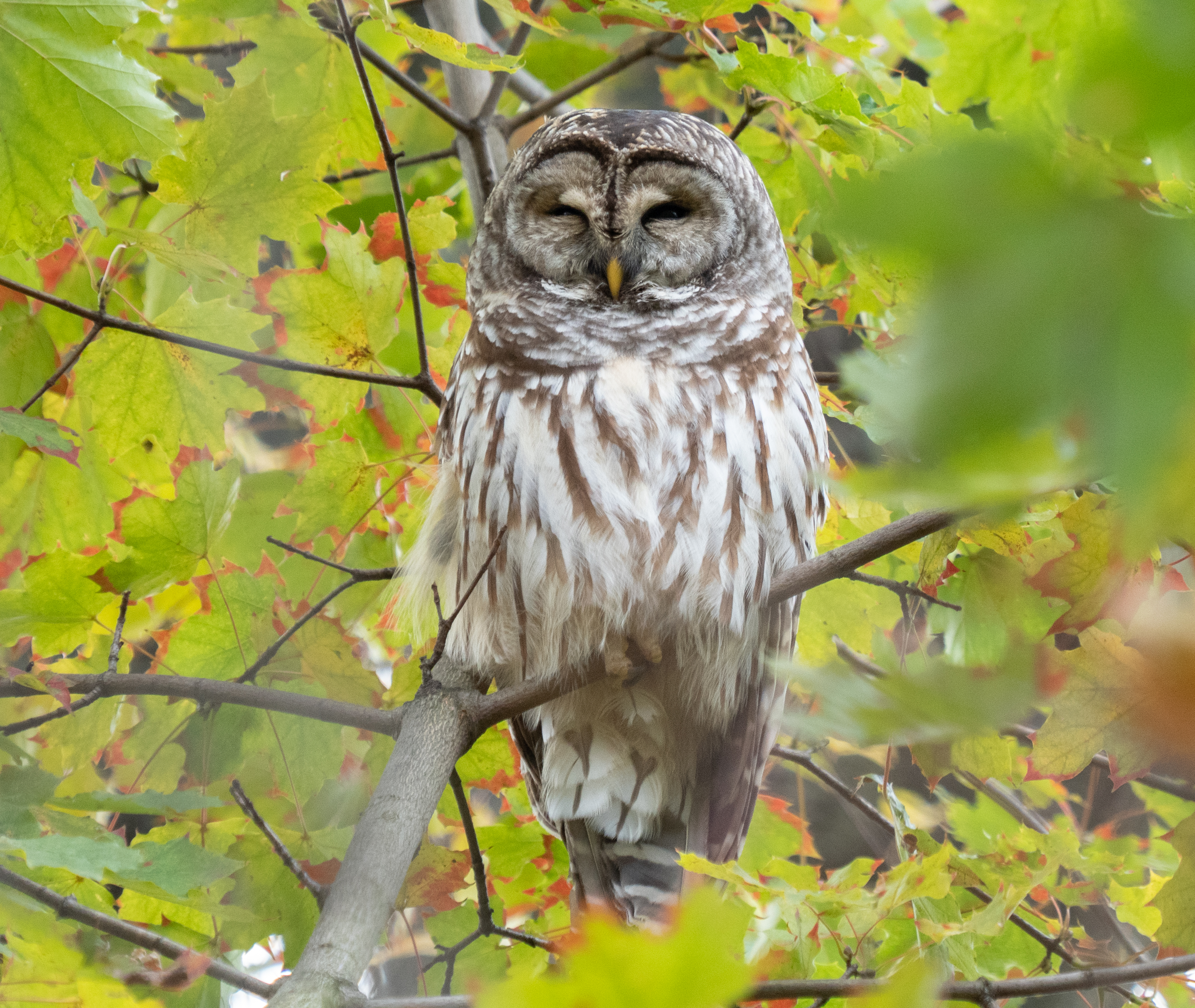
- Barry the barred owl, 2020
- Species: Barred owl
- Sex: Female
- Hatched: c. 2020
- Died: 6 August 2021; The Ramble and Lake, New York City, U.S.
- Resting place: 40°46′4″N 73°58′18″W
- Known for: A female barred owl that lived in Central Park in New York City for about ten months.
- Residence: Central Park

Barry (died August 6, 2021) was a female barred owl that lived in Central Park in New York City for about ten months.

== Spotting ==
Barry was first spotted on October 9, 2020, by a group of birders. Barry quickly became a desired sighting for birders and regular park visitors. Those who wanted to see Barry would go to the Loch, a creek in the northwest of the park. Barry's observers were eventually able to determine she was a female owl from the pitch of her hoot; however, the name "Barry" that she was originally given stuck. Following her death, the Wild Bird Fund estimated that she was approximately a year old from looking at the colors of her plumage.

Unlike behavior considered normal for an owl, Barry seemed unbothered by the presence of humans, often perching near paths where her admirers stood.

In April 2021, Barry set the record for the longest stay in Central Park for a barred owl, ultimately choosing it as her home instead of migrating.

Barry was tracked by Manhattan Bird Alert, a feed on Twitter which tracks bird sightings across New York City. If Barry was posted to the feed, dozens of people rushed to the location to see her. Barry's activities when not sleeping included hunting small animals throughout the park and splashing in water on hot days.

== Death ==
Barry died on August 6, 2021, as a result of truck collision.

After her death, Barry was memorialized in a vigil on August 9, 2021. It was held under the tree she was most often spotted in near the Central Park Boathouse. Hundreds attended her vigil.

At the time of her death, Barry had a potentially lethal amount of rat poison in her body. This may have impaired her flying ability and prevented her from evading the van that struck her.

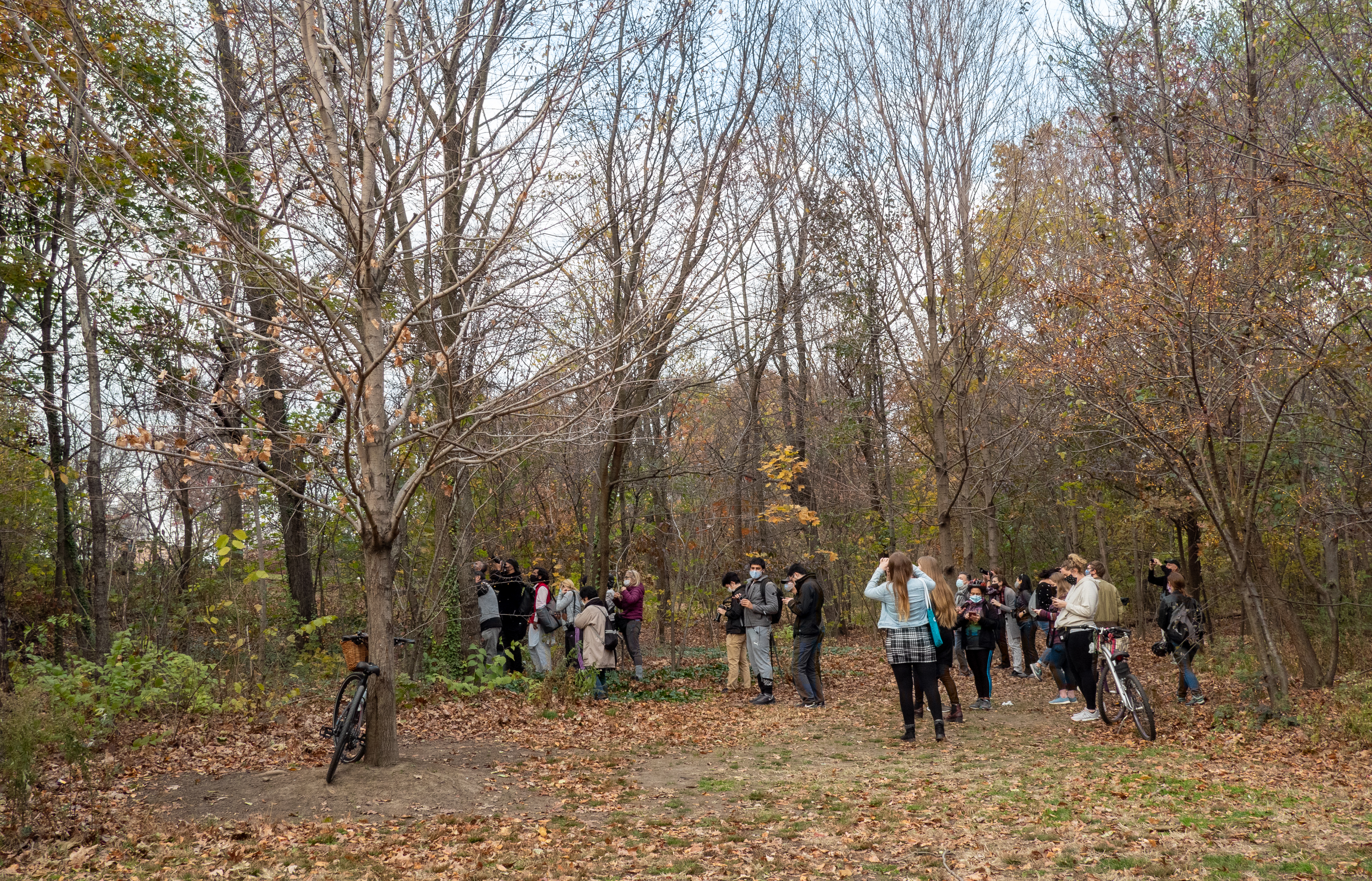
Barry the barred owl's entourage, 2020

== See also ==
- List of individual birds
- Flaco, a Eurasian-eagle owl which escaped from the Central Park Zoo in 2023
