= Wellfleet Bay Wildlife Sanctuary =

Wildlife sanctuary in Massachusetts

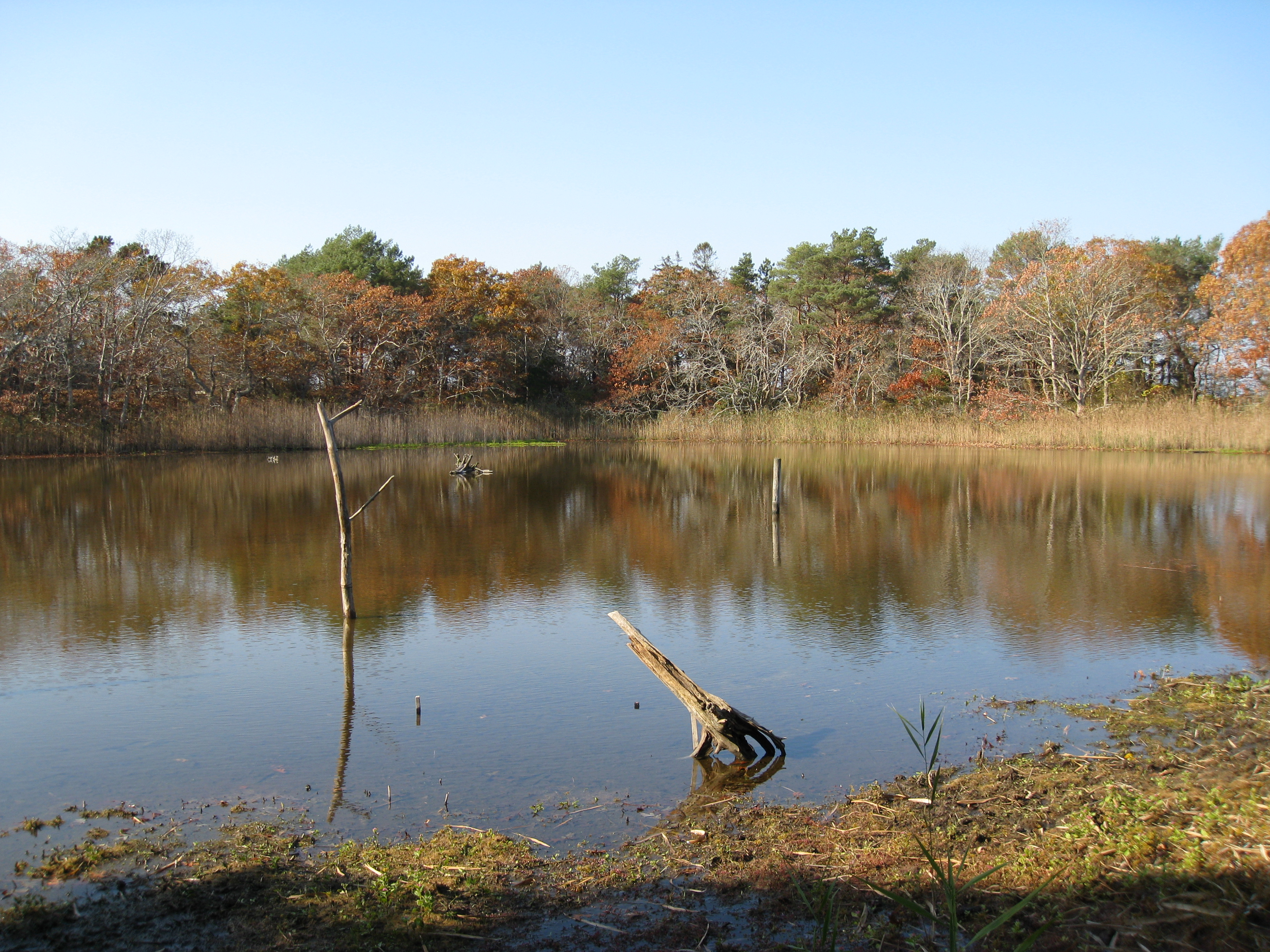

- Location within Massachusetts
- Type: Wildlife sanctuary, nature center
- Location: 291 State Highway, Route 6 South Wellfleet, Massachusetts, US
- Coordinates: 41°52′55.7″N 69°59′44.4″W
- Area: 1,183 acres (479 ha)
- Operator: Massachusetts Audubon Society
- Hiking trails: 5 miles
- Website: Wellfleet Bay Wildlife Sanctuary

Wellfleet Bay Wildlife Sanctuary is a 1,183 acres (479 ha) wildlife sanctuary located in Wellfleet, Massachusetts, on Cape Cod. The sanctuary was established by the Massachusetts Audubon Society in 1957. It includes walking trails along Wellfleet Harbor of Cape Cod Bay as well as a nature center and a campground.

== History ==
Wellfleet Bay is located on land within the territory of the Nauset Indigenous nation. In the 19th century, the land was used for asparagus and turnip farming. In 1929, ornithologist Oliver L. Austin founded the Austin Ornithological Research Center on the land. After Austin's death in 1957, the research center's 366 acres of land was purchased by Mass Audubon. Since then, Mass Audubon has acquired more than 800 acres of adjacent land.

In 2019, Melissa Lowe Cestaro was named director of the sanctuary. She replaced Bob Prescott, who had held the job for 40 years.

== Land and trails ==
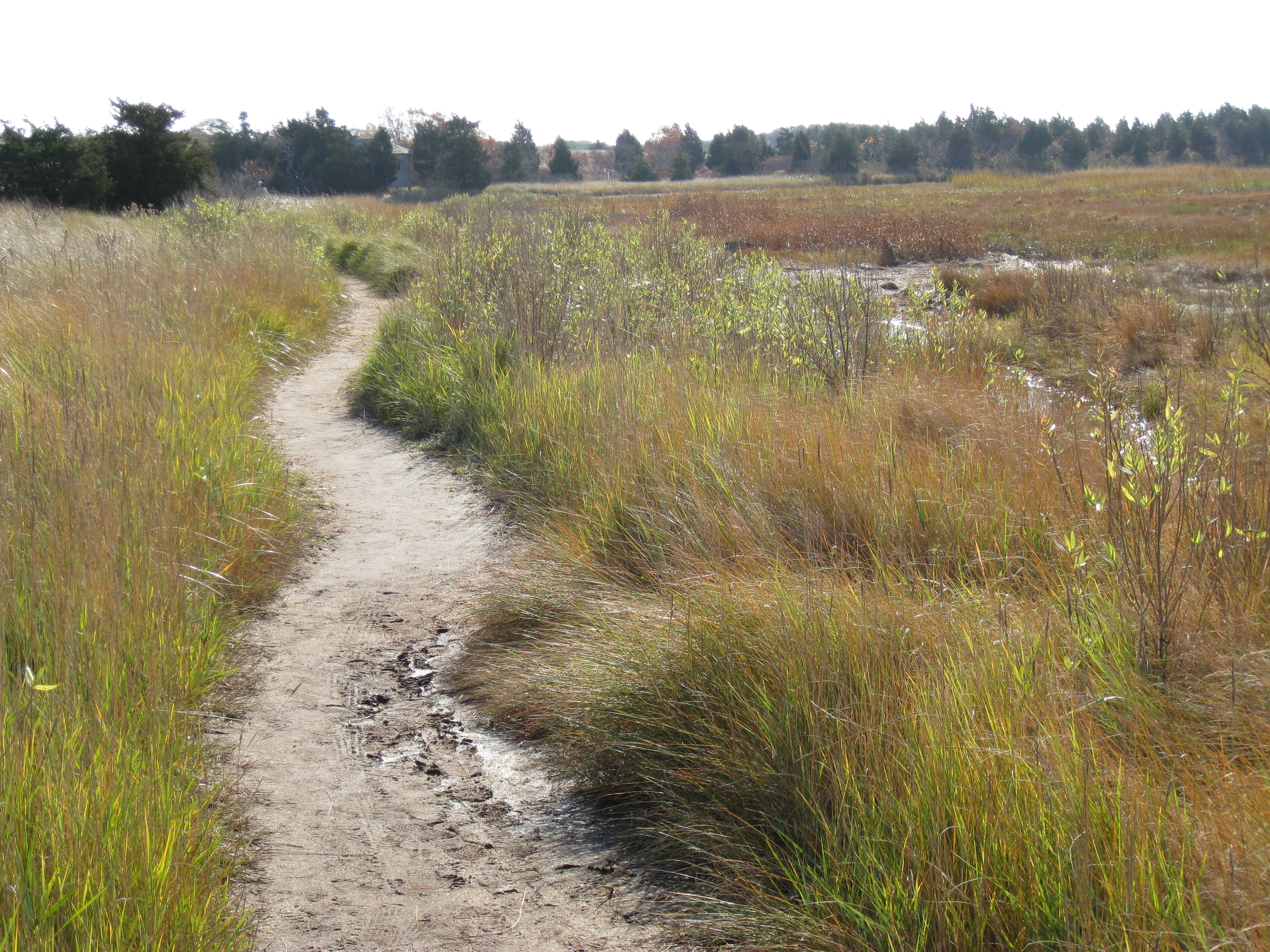

Wellfleet Bay's 5 miles of trail pass by Goose Pond and through a salt marsh, sandy barrier beach, and pine woodlands. An all-persons pathway and a sensory trail make the sanctuary accessible to a wide range of visitors.

Wellfleet Bay is one of the most popular birding locations on Cape Cod. According to eBird, at least 309 bird species have been identified in the sanctuary.

The sanctuary organizes volunteers to monitor Diamondback terrapin nests on the Try Island trail. As hatchlings leave the nests, the volunteers move them from exposed areas to more secluded spots to protect them from gulls, skunks, raccoons, and other predators.

== Nature center and programs ==
The nature center includes exhibits, a gift shop, and meeting rooms. The building was renovated in 2008 and received Platinum LEED certification.

Wellfleet Bay programs include a summer camp for children and an adult field school, as well as kayaking, birding, and school vacation week programs.

A 17-site campground is available for use by members of Mass Audubon.

== Gallery ==
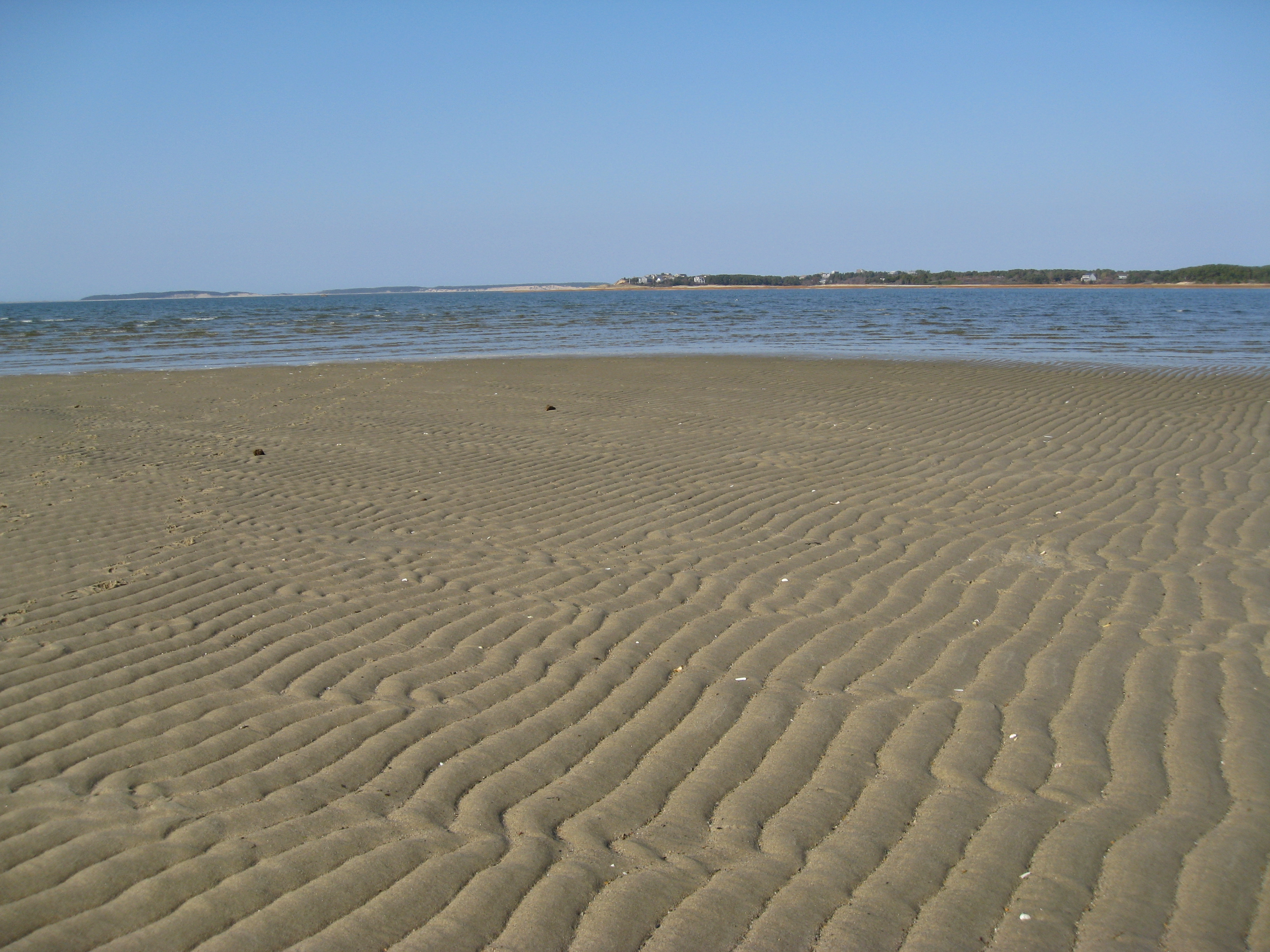

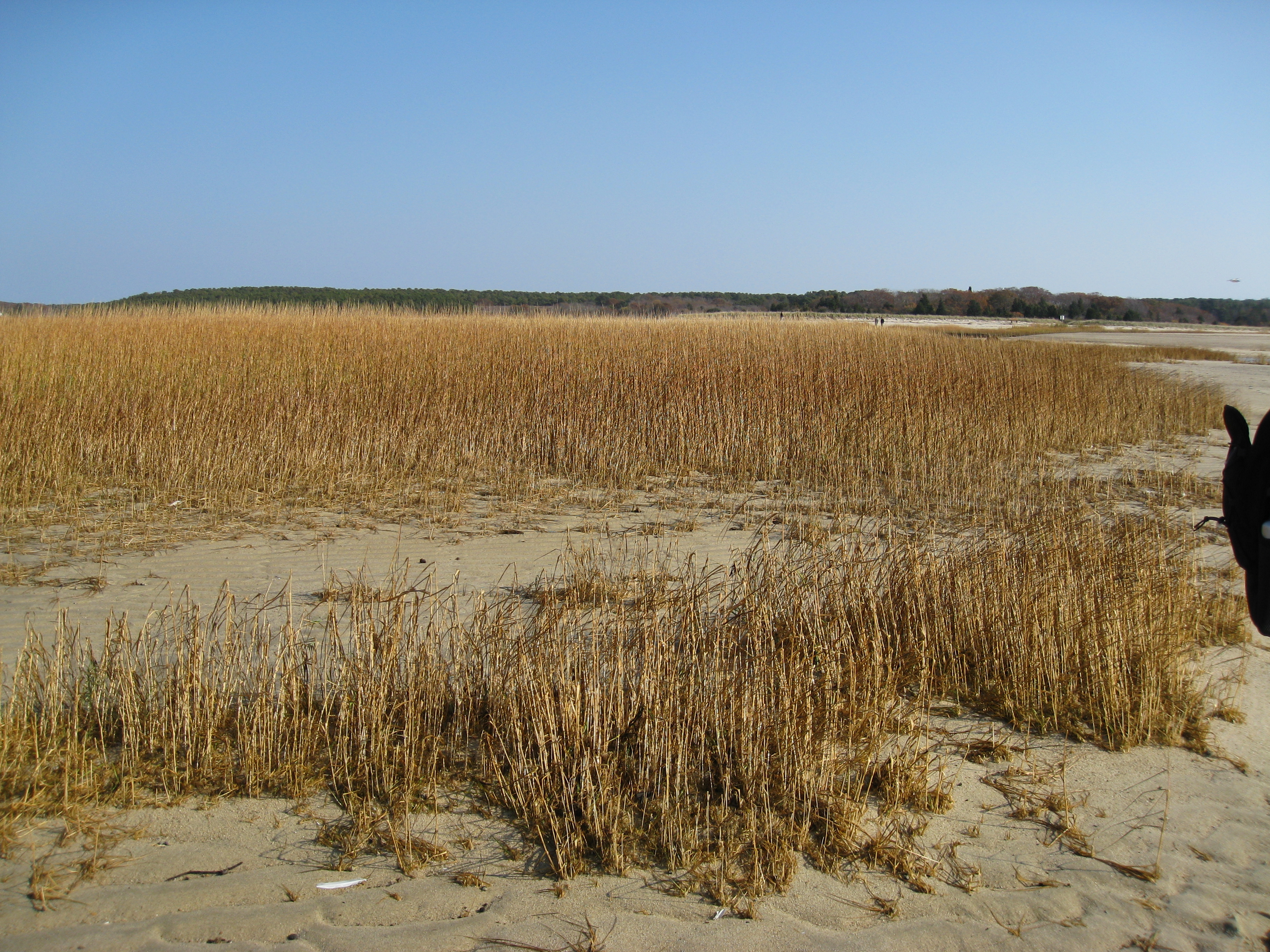

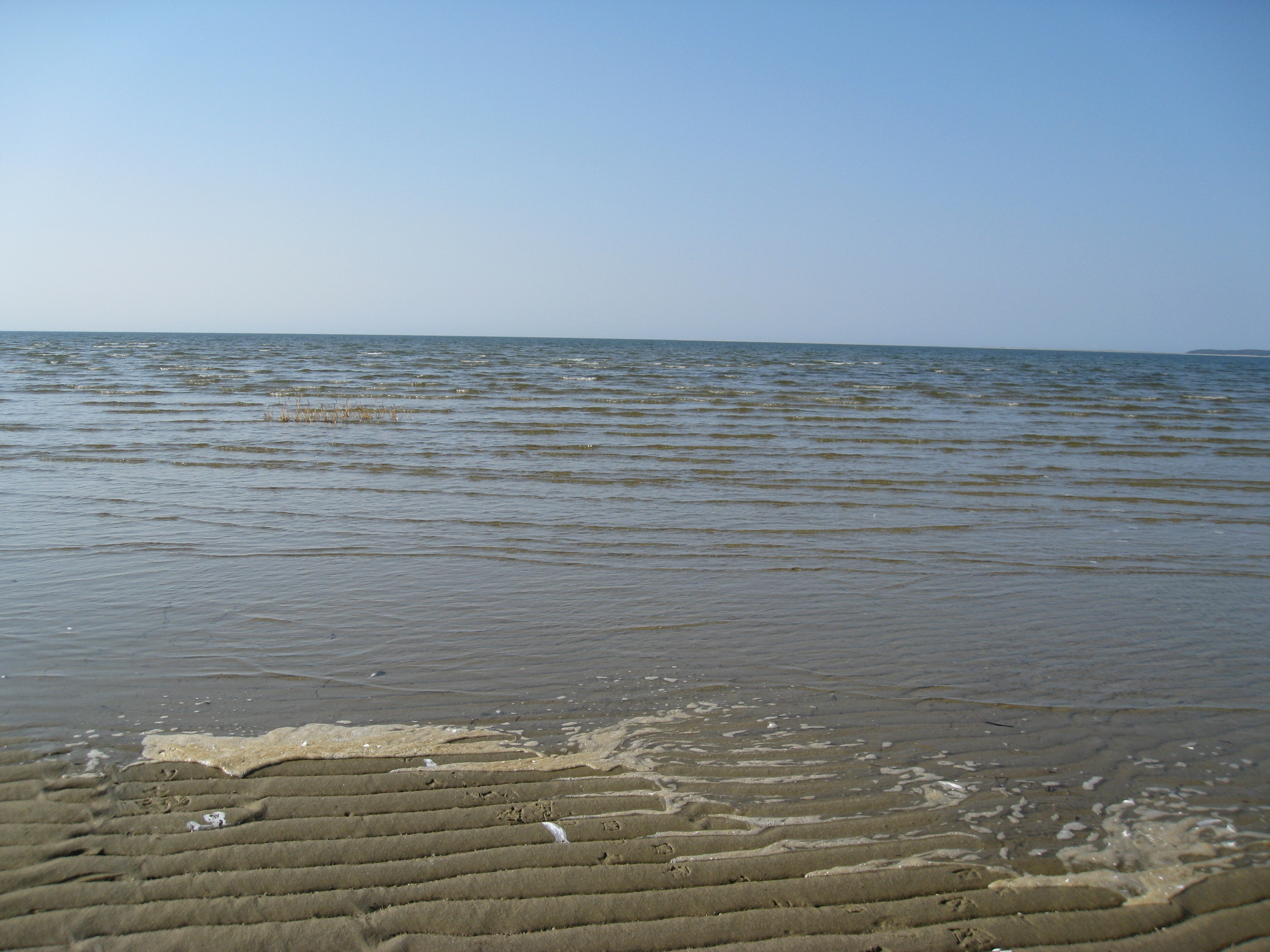

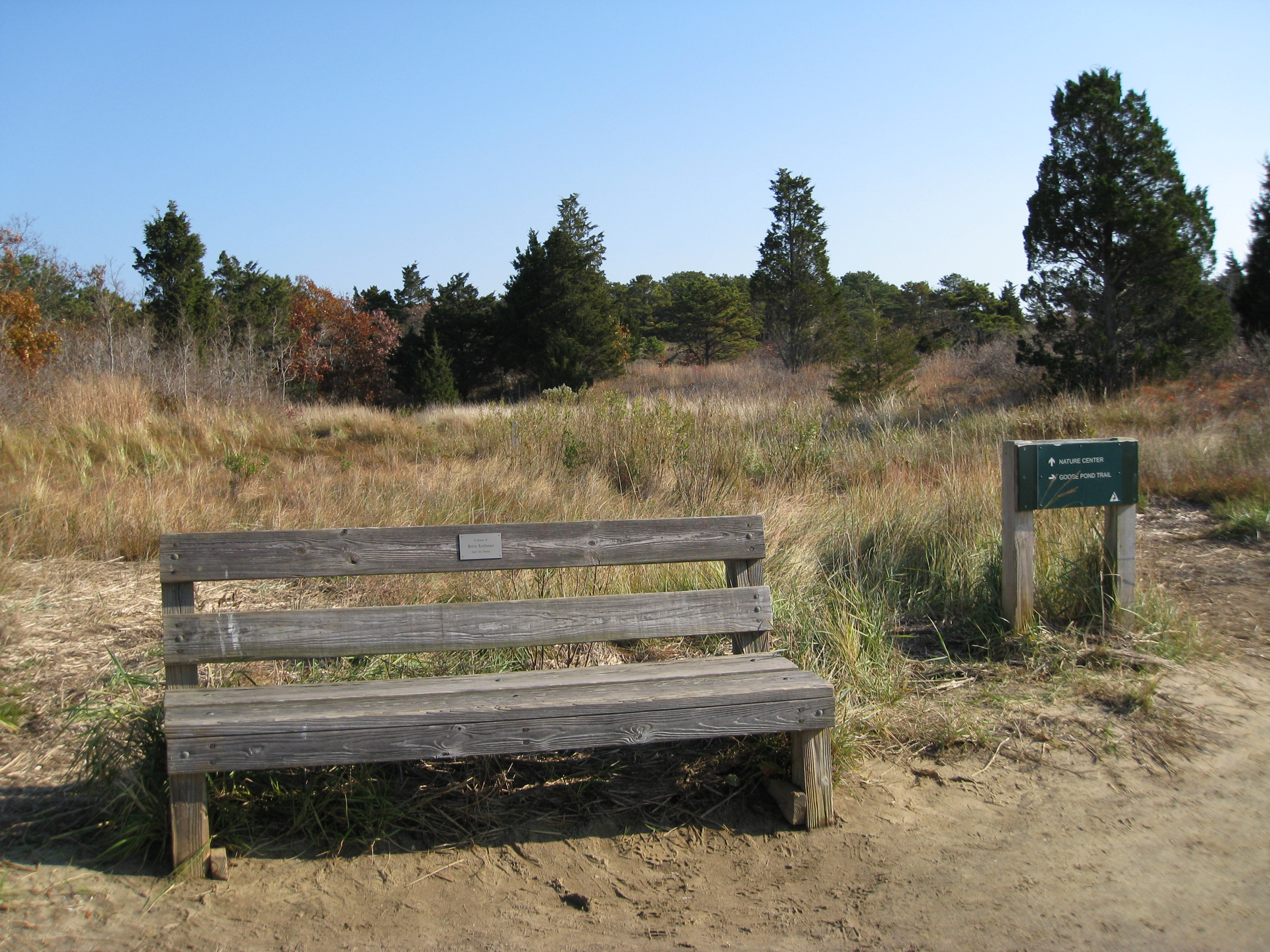
