= Wild Bird Fund =

American non-profit veterinary hospital

Coordinates: 40°47′14″N 73°58′17″W

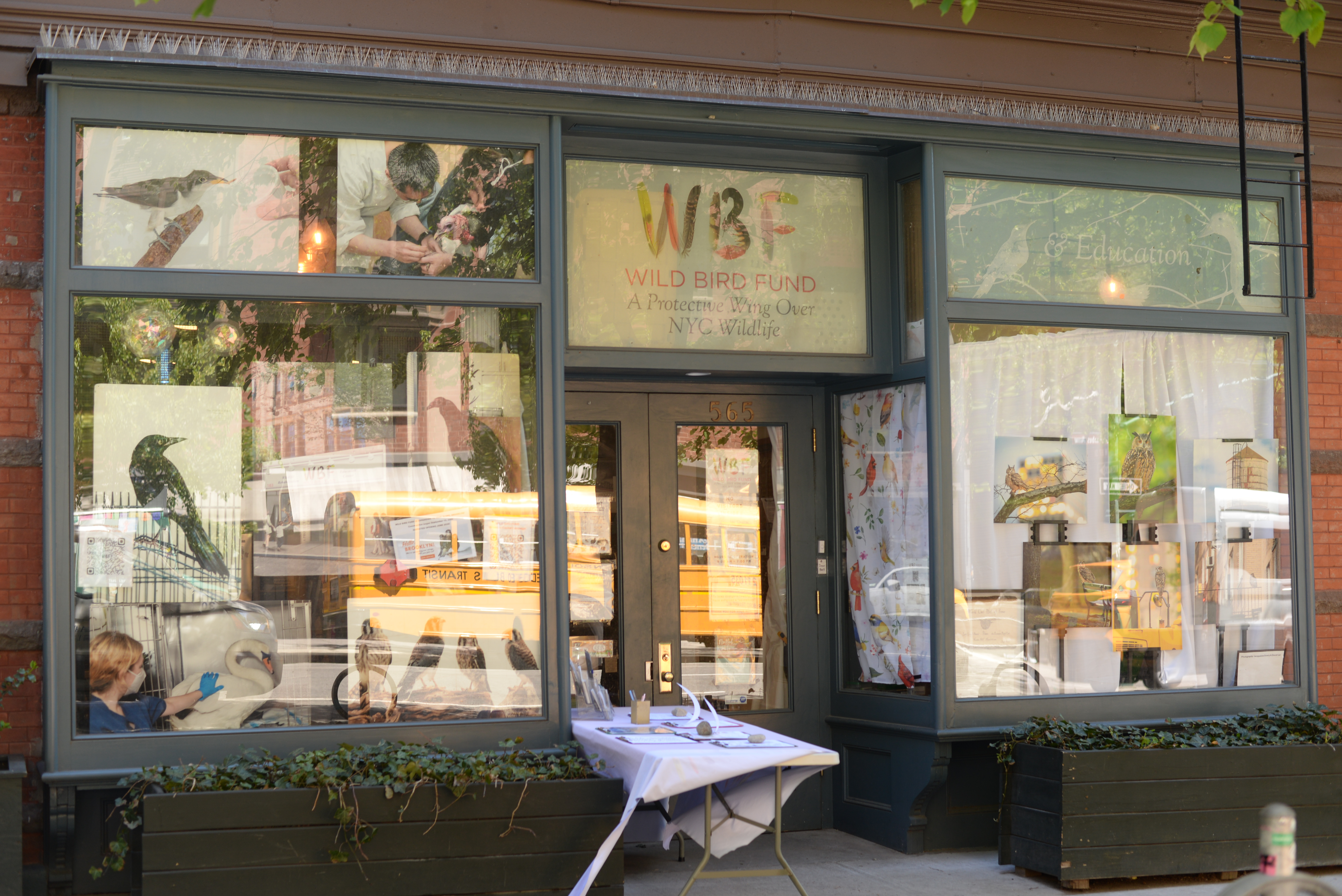
- Founded: 2001 (incorporated 2005)
- Founder: Rita McMahon
- Type: 501(c)(3) Non-profit Organization
- Purpose: Wildlife rehabilitation
- Location: Manhattan, New York
- Region served: New York metropolitan area
- Website: Wildbirdfund.org

The Wild Bird Fund is a non-profit animal hospital on the Upper West Side of Manhattan in New York City. It is the city's first and only wild animal hospital.

== History and facilities ==
The Wild Bird Fund was founded by Rita McMahon in 2001 after she found an injured Canada goose on the side of Interstate 684. She tried to find a veterinarian to treat the bird, but none would accept wildlife. Eventually, she told a veterinary hospital that it was her pet, but by that time it was too late and the goose did not survive. Upset that there was nowhere in the city to take care of wild birds, she sought out training and began operating out of her Upper West Side apartment, housing up to 60 birds at a time. The Wild Bird Fund was incorporated as a nonprofit in 2005, marking the city's first licensed wildlife hospital. It operated in McMahon's New York apartment for several years, and in a space inside a veterinary hospital, Animal General, on Columbus Avenue in Manhattan's Upper West Side.

The rescue center opened its own dedicated facility across the street from Animal General on Columbus Avenue in the spring of 2012, though it still relies on neighborhood veterinarians for some specialized equipment or doctors. The first floor includes an intake room, quarantine chamber, imaging machines, and a pool for waterfowl. The lower-level houses an operating room and cages. It is the city's only wild animal clinic, and may treat more than 400 birds at a time, with up to 50 coming in each day and 7,000 yearly patients as of 2020.

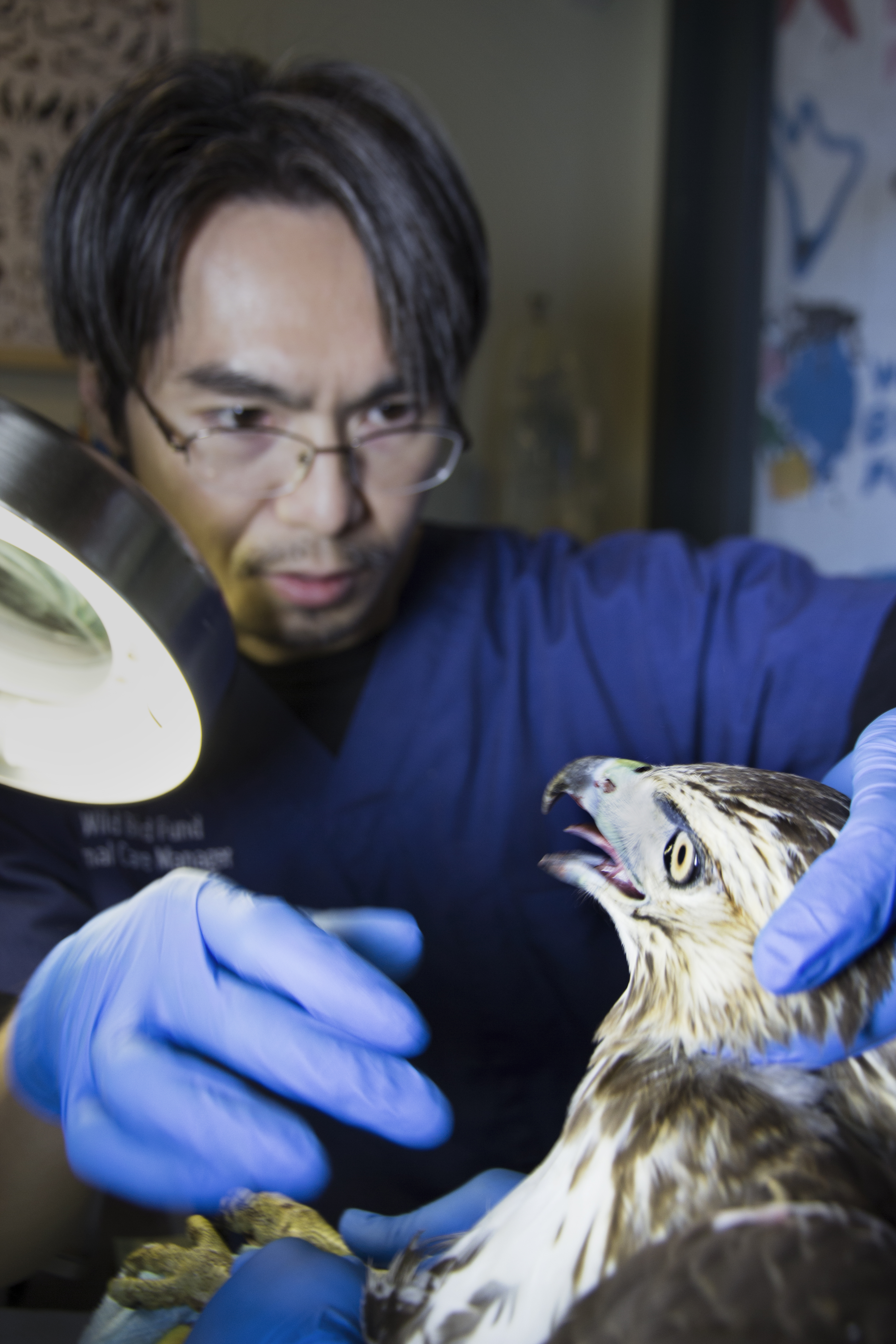
A veterinary technician examines a red-tailed hawk at the Wild Bird Fund

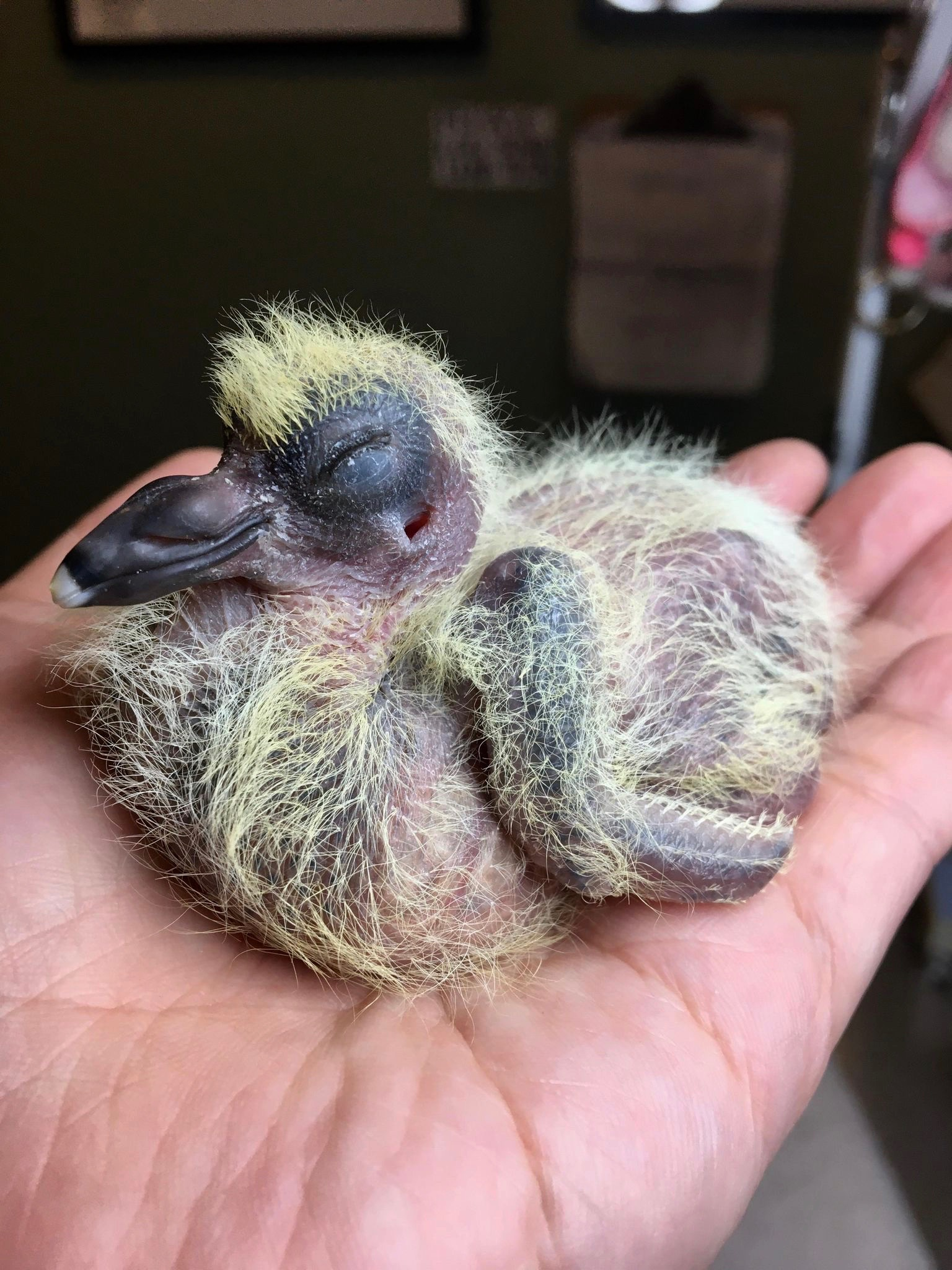
A nestling feral pigeon at the Wild Bird Fund, one of the most frequent patients.

== Operation ==
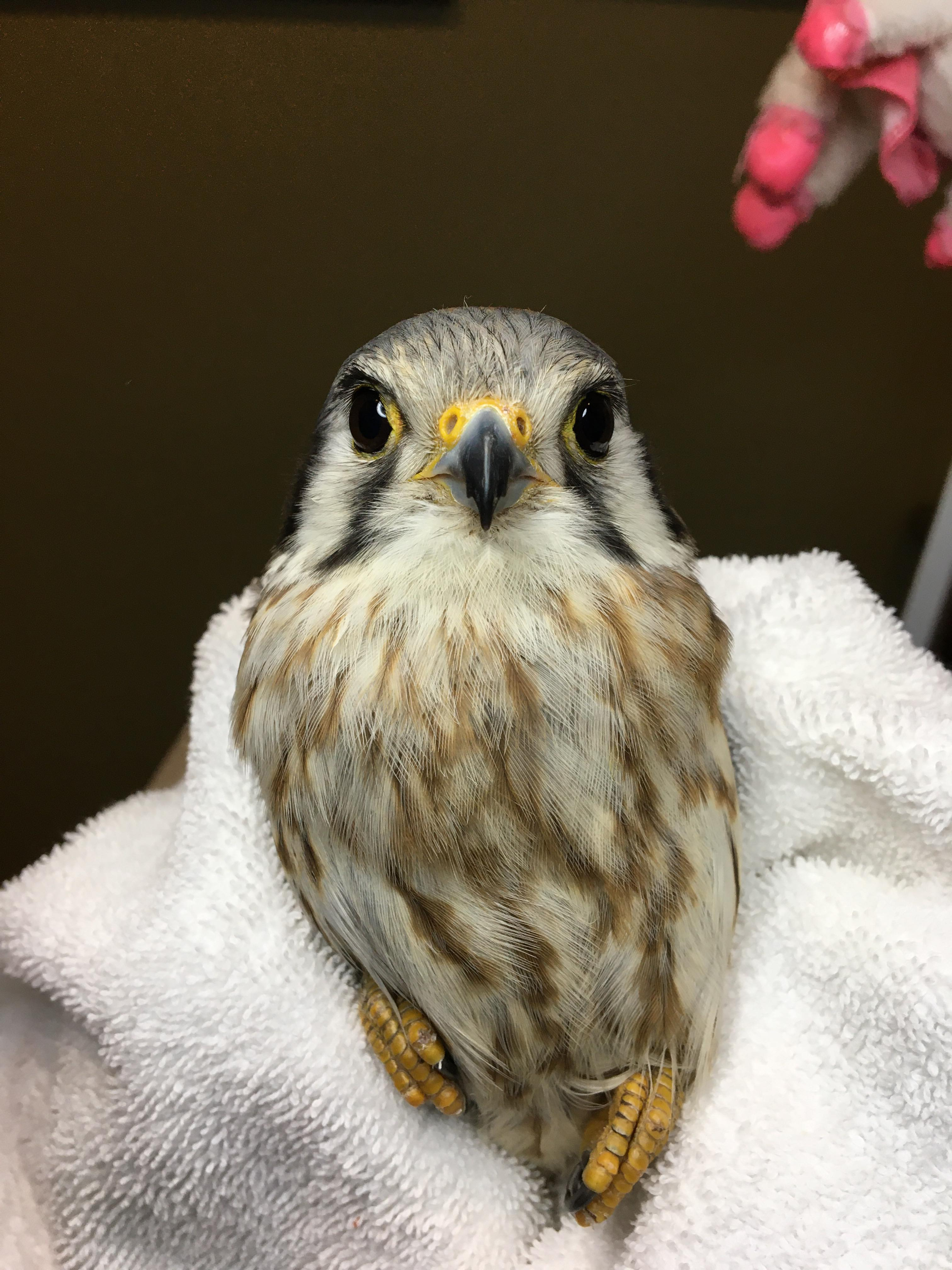
American kestrel being treated for a parasitic infection and injuries resulting from a window collision

Most of the Wild Bird Fund's patients are brought to the facility by members of the public, as well as by organizations like the Animal Care Centers of NYC and the NYC Department of Parks and Recreation. The hospital treats a wide range of bird species, as well as other small wildlife, though its most common patients are pigeons. About a sixth of all patients are baby pigeons.

The leading cause of injury is window collisions. New York City was built along the Atlantic Flyway, a major migration path, and birds are confused by lights behind the windows or reflections of trees or sky, colliding with glass in large numbers, especially during spring and fall migration. The New York City Audubon Society estimates the number of bird deaths by window collision in the city to be between 90,000 and 230,000 each year. Most crashes occur during fall by birds making their first migration. Other ailments might be caused by lead in the environment, rodenticide, car or bicycle collisions, discarded fishing line, and cat or dog attacks. Nestling and fledgling birds make up a large portion of the patient population during summer.

When injured birds are admitted, they are categorized according to the seriousness of their injuries, with some spending time in an open area that allows them to fly, some kept in cloth baskets with perches, and others placed in incubators. According to McMahon, half of the animals brought in for treatment are rehabilitated and returned to the wild while others die or are euthanized. Some require long-term care or cannot be released to the wild and are transferred to other regional sanctuaries like The Raptor Trust in New Jersey or private sanctuaries in upstate New York. For recovered birds, the site of release is based in part on whether they are migrating, and in which direction. While many pigeons are released in nearby Central Park, birds migrating south might be released in Prospect Park in Brooklyn, which allows a mostly clear path to the south as compared to Central Park and most other sites in Manhattan.

The hospital employs an animal care staff of about 25 people, with assistance from 100 or more volunteers. It does not charge for services, relying largely on individual donations, as well as foundation grants and sponsorships.

During the COVID-19 pandemic, with a larger number of people birding and spending time in nature, the Wild Bird Fund saw an increase in the number of injured birds taken to the hospital, even while there was no evidence the number of overall injuries increased.
