= Bal-chatri =

Trap designed to catch birds of prey

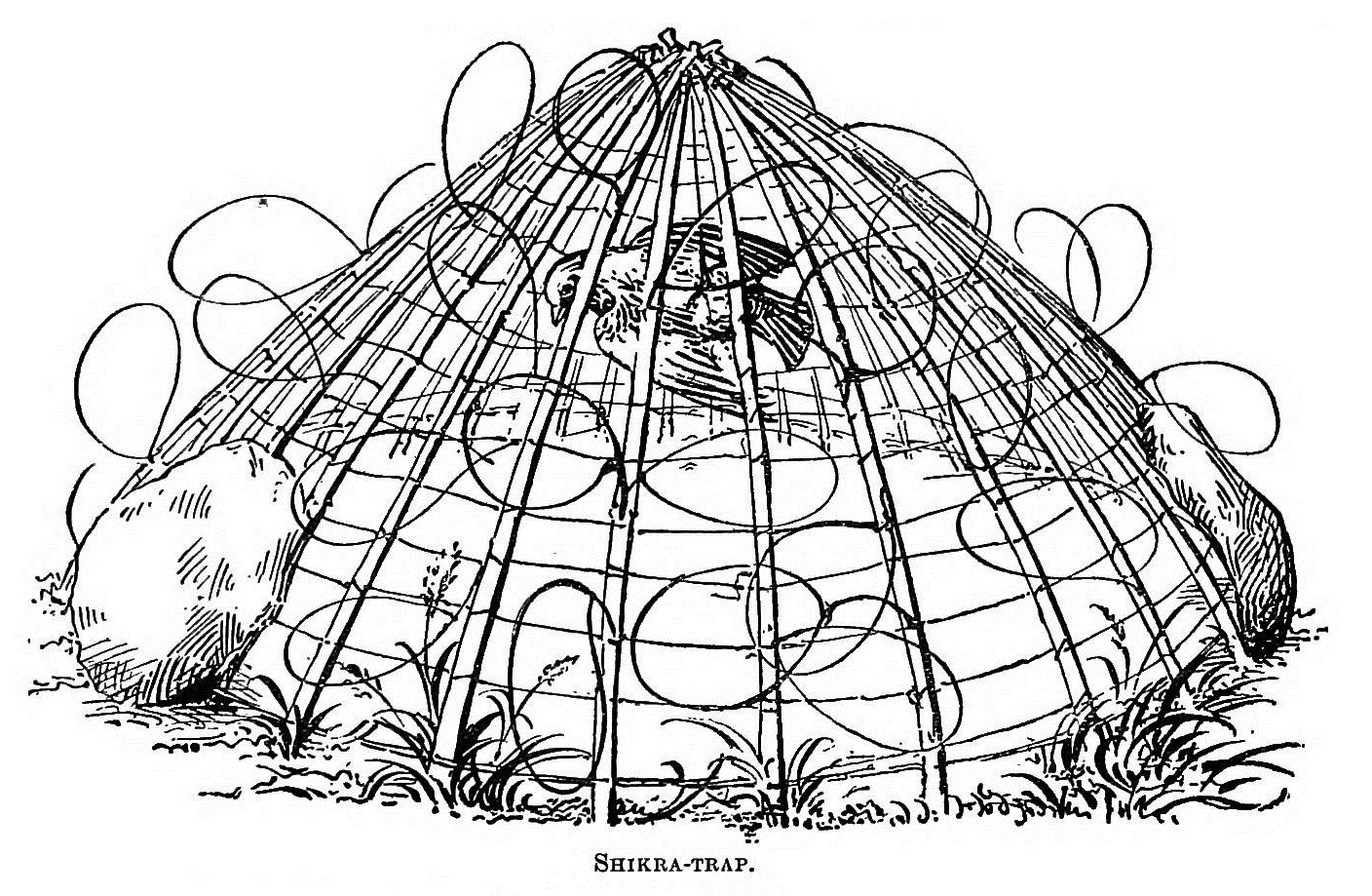
Bal-chatri made of split bamboo with a small bird as bait used for trapping shikras (India, 1897)

Bal-chatri (/bɑːl tʃʌθri/) are traps designed to catch birds of prey (raptors). The trap essentially consists of a cage baited inside with a conspicuously visible live rodent or small bird, with a series of monofilament nooses attached to the surface to snare the legs of a free-flying raptor that attempts to take the bait. The name is derived from the Hindi word used by trappers in India. Modified bal-chatri traps are also used for catching shrikes.

== History ==
The bal-chatri originated in East India as a trap developed and used by falconers to catch suitable birds of prey to train for use in hunting. It consisted of a small, conical, cane cage, containing live lure birds to attract raptors, and covered with attached horsehair nooses to entangle their feet. The term bal-chatri (Hindi: बाल छत्री) has been mistranslated as "boy's umbrella", or "small umbrella", after their shape but is correctly translated to "hair umbrella" and refers to the nooses made of horse-hair anchored to the umbrella-like frame. Bal-chatris continue to be used by falconers, but are also used in ornithological research projects which require the capture of raptors for banding and other procedures, such as blood sampling.

== Methodology and use ==
Contemporary traps are made of more modern materials, such as wire mesh cages with nooses made of nylon monofilament. The traps vary from 25–50 cm in diameter or length, with the nooses 4–12 cm in diameter. They are normally weighted to prevent them from being carried away by ensnared birds. The live lure, or bait, animals used for the trap are usually rodents such as house mice. The cage may have a double wall, or a removable roof or inner compartment, both to protect the bait animals from the raptors, and to prevent them damaging the nooses by chewing them.

The traps are designed to be highly portable and may be deployed opportunistically from a slowly moving vehicle on a roadside when a hawk or falcon is sighted perch-hunting from a pole or utility line along a road. They may also be used near nesting sites in order to trap a breeding pair. Active traps require continuous monitoring. Users require proper training; there are ethical considerations and the need for experience in the use of bal-chatris to avoid harming, and minimizing temporary stress to, the bait animals and the raptors caught.
