= List of tree species in New York City =

This page lists tree and large shrub species native to New York City, as well as cultivated, invasive, naturalized, and introduced species.

== List of trees growing in New York City ==
This list includes street trees of New York City; as well as trees planted in New York City parks and public spaces:

Scientific name	Common name	Photo	Size	Native species	Planted in NYC streets	Edible fruit
Acer campestre	Field maple		Small	Non-native	Yes	
Acer ginnala	Amur maple		Small	Non-native	Yes	
Acer griseum	Paperbark maple		Small	Non-native	Yes	
Acer platanoides	Norway maple		Large	Non-native, Invasive	Yes, Approved	No
Acer rubrum	Red maple		Large	Native	Yes	
Acer saccharinum	Silver maple		Large	Native	Yes	
Aesculus hippocastanum	Horse-chestnut		Large	Non-native	Yes	
Aesculus octandra	Common buckeye		Large	Native	Yes	
Ailanthus altissima	Tree of heaven		Large	Non-native, Invasive	Yes, Not Approved	No
Alnus glutinosa	European alder		Large	Non-native	Yes	
Amelanchier canadensis	Serviceberry		Small	Native	Yes	
Betula nigra	Black birch		Large	Native	Yes	
Carpinus betulus	European hornbeam		Large	Non-native	Yes	
Carpinus caroliniana	American hornbeam		Medium	Native	Yes	
Carya laciniosa	Shellback hickory		Large	Native	No	
Catalpa speciosa	Northern catalpa		Medium	Non-native	No	
Cedrus spp.	Cedars		Large	Non-native	No	
Celtis occidentalis	Common hackberry		Medium	Native	Yes	Yes
Cercidiphyllum japonicum	Katsura		Medium	Non-native	Yes	No
Cercis canadensis	Eastern redbud		Medium	Non-native	Yes	No
Chamaecyparis thyoides	Atlantic white cedar		Large	Native	Yes	No
Chionanthus virginicus	White fringetree		Medium	Non-native	Yes	No
Cladrastis kentukea	Kentucky yellowwood		Medium	Non-native	Yes	No
Cornus kousa	Kousa dogwood		Small	Non-native	Yes	
Cornus mas	Cornelian cherry		Small	Non-native	Yes	Yes
Corylus colurna	Turkish hazel		Tall	Non-native	Yes	Yes
Crataegus crus‑galli var. inermis	Thornless cockspur hawthorn		Medium	Native	Yes	Yes
Crataegus spathulata	Littlehip hawthorn		Small	Non-native	No	
Diospyros virginiana	American persimmon			Native	No	Yes
Eucommia ulmoides	Hardy rubber tree		Large	Non-native	Yes	No
Fagus sylvatica	European beech		Large	Non-native	Yes	Yes
Fagus sylvatica 'Pendula'	Weeping beech		Large	Non-native, Not Invasive	No, Not Approved	No
Ginkgo biloba	Ginkgo		Large	Non-native	Yes	Yes
Gleditsia triacanthos f. inermis	Thornless honey locust		Large	Non-native	Yes	Yes
Gymnocladus dioicus	Kentucky coffeetree		Large	Non-native	Yes	Yes
Halesia spp.	Silverbells				No	
Hamamelis spp.	Witch-hazels				No	
Ilex spp.	Hollies				No	
Juglans spp.	Walnut trees				No	Yes
Juniperus spp.	Junipers				No	
Koelreuteria paniculata	Goldenrain tree		Medium	Non-native	Yes	
Laburnum spp.	Golden chains			Non-native	No	No
Larix laricina	American larch			Native	No	
Liquidambar styraciflua	Sweetgum		Large	Native	Yes	
Liriodendron tulipifera	Tulip tree		Large	Native	Yes	
Maackia amurensis	Amur maackia		Medium	Non-native	Yes	
Maclura pomifera	Osage-orange			Non-native	No	
Magnolia grandiflora	Laurel magnolia		Large	Non-native, Not Invasive	No, Not Approved	No
Magnolia cultivars	Magnolia 'Elizabeth', Magnolia 'Butterflies'		Medium	Hybrid	Approved	No
Malus spectabilis	Chinese flowering apple			Non-native		
Metasequoia glyptostroboides	Dawn redwood		Large	Non-native	Yes	
Morus spp.	Mulberries				No	
Nyssa sylvatica	Black gum		Large	Native	Yes	
Ostrya virginiana	American hophornbeam		Medium	Native	Yes	
Oxydendrum arboreum	Sorrel tree			Non-native	No	
Phellodendron amurense	Amur cork tree			Non-native	No	
Picea pungens	Blue spruce			Non-native	No	
Pinus resinosa	Red pine			Non-native	No	
Pinus strobus	Eastern white pine			Native	No	
Pinus sylvestris	Scots pine			Non-native	No	
Platanus × hispanica	London plane		Large	Non-native	Yes	
Populus spp.	Poplars				No	
Prunus 'Kanzan'	Kanzan cherry		Small	Non-native	Yes	
Prunus × incam	Okamé cherry		Small	Non-native	Yes	
Prunus × yedoensis	Yoshino cherry		Small	Non-native	Yes	
Prunus cerasifera	Cherry plum		Small	Non-native	Yes	Yes
Prunus padus	Bird cherry			Non-native	No	
Prunus sargentii	Sargent cherry		Small	Non-native	Yes	
Prunus virginiana 'Schubert'	Canada red cherry		Small	Native	Yes	
Pseudotsuga menziesii subsp. glauca	Douglas-fir			Non-native	No	
Pyrus calleryana	Callery pear			Invasive	No	Yes
Quercus acutissima	Sawtooth oak		Large	Non-native	Yes	
Quercus alba	White oak		Large	Native	Yes	
Quercus bicolor	Swamp white oak		Large	Native	Yes	
Quercus coccinea	Scarlet oak		Large	Native	Yes	
Quercus dentata	Japanese emperor oak		Large	Non-native	Yes	
Quercus frainetto	Hungarian oak		Large	Non-native	Yes	
Quercus imbricaria	Shingle oak		Large	Non-native	Yes	
Quercus macrocarpa	Bur oak		Large	Non-native	Yes	
Quercus montana	Chestnut oak		Large	Native	Yes	
Quercus muehlenbergii	Chinkapin oak		Large	Native	Yes	
Quercus palustris	Pin oak		Large	Native	Yes	
Quercus phellos	Willow oak		Large	Native	Yes	
Quercus robur	Pedunculate oak			Non-native		
Quercus robur 'Fastigiata'	Fastigiate oak		Large	Non-native	Yes	
Quercus rubra	Northern red oak		Large	Native	Yes	
Quercus shumardii	Shumard oak		Large	Non-native	Yes	
Quercus texana	Nuttall's oak		Large	Non-native	Yes	
Quercus velutina	Eastern black oak		Large	Native	Yes	
Robinia spp.	Locusts			Non-native	No	
Salix spp.	Willows				No	
Sassafras albidum	Sassafras			Native	No	
Sorbus aucuparia	Rowan tree			Non-native	No	
Styphnolobium japonicum	Japanese pagoda tree		Large	Non-native	Yes	
Styrax japonicus	Japanese snowbell			Non-native	No	
Syringa reticulata	Japanese tree lilac		Small	Non-native	Yes	
Syringa reticulata subsp. pekinensis	Chinese tree lilac		Small	Non-native	Yes	
Taxodium distichum	Bald cypress		Large	Non-native	Yes	
Thuja occidentalis	Northern white-cedar			Native	No	
Tilia americana	American linden		Large	Native	Yes	
Tilia cordata	Littleleaf linden		Large	Non-native	Yes	
Tilia tomentosa	Silver linden		Large	Non-native	Yes	
Tsuga canadensis	Eastern hemlock			Native	No	
Ulmus americana	American elm		Large	Native	Yes	No
Ulmus glabra 'Camperdownii'	Camperdown elm		Medium	Non-native, Not Invasive	No, Not Approved	No
Ulmus parvifolia	Chinese elm		Large	Non-native	Yes	No
Ulmus minor	English elm		Large	Non-native	No, Not Approved	No
Zelkova serrata	Japanese zelkova		Large	Non-native	Yes	No

== See also ==
- Trees of New York City
