= Environment of New York City =

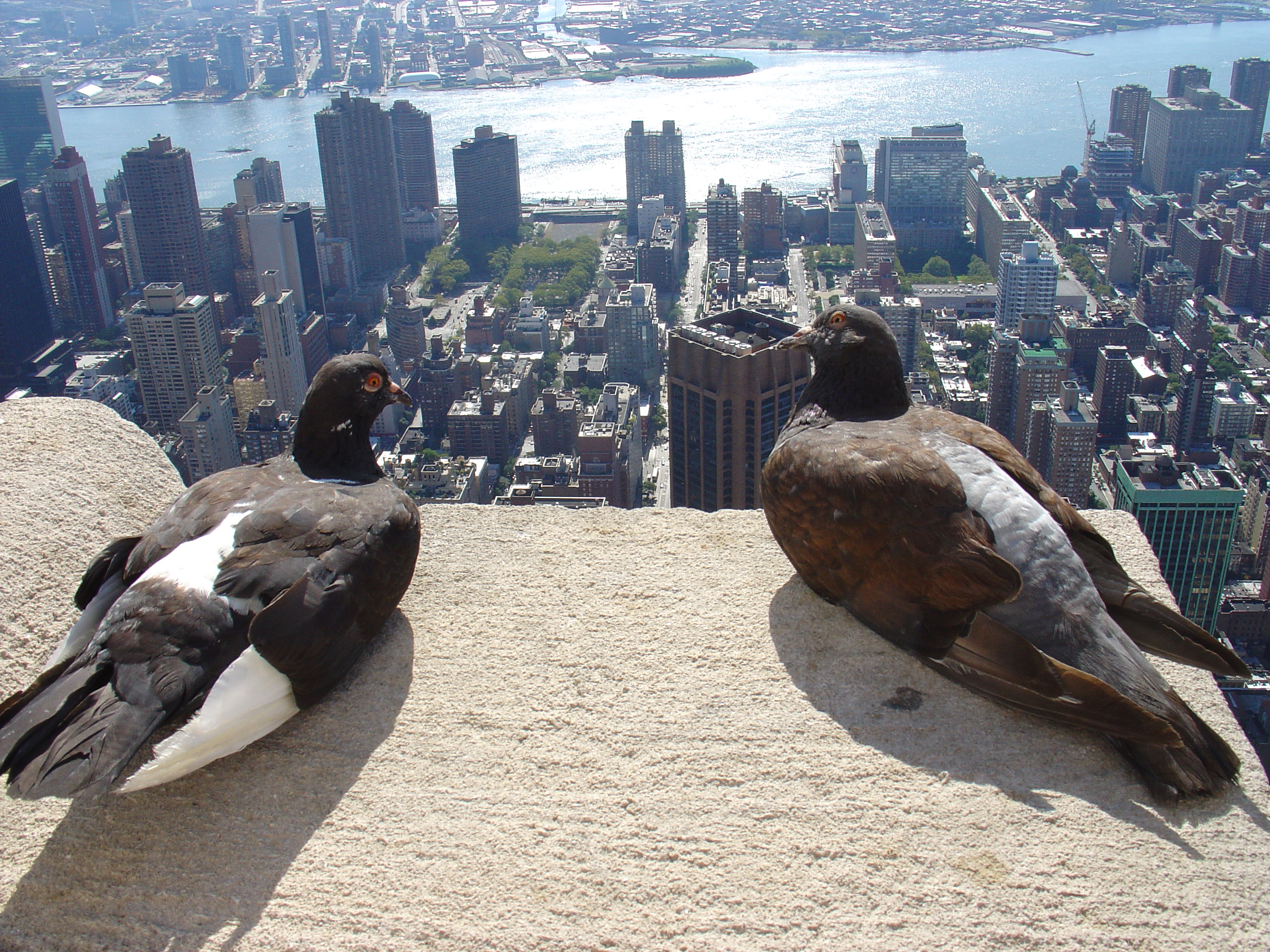
Feral pigeons on the Empire State Building

The environment of New York City consists of many interwoven ecosystems as part of the New York–New Jersey Harbor Estuary. The climate of New York City shapes the environment with its cool, wet winters and hot, humid summers with plentiful rainfall all year round. As of 2020, New York City held 44,509 acres of urban tree canopy with 24% of its land covered in trees. As of 2020, the population of New York City numbered 8.8 million human beings.

== Climate ==
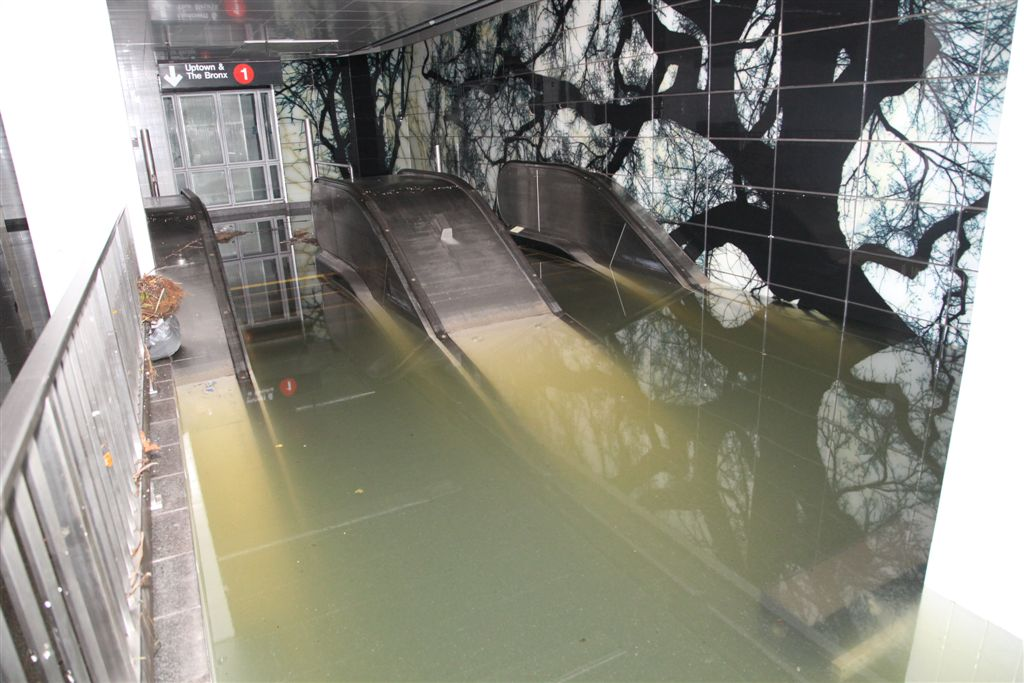
Flooded South Ferry/Whitehall Street station in Manhattan during Hurricane Sandy

The climate of New York City features a humid subtropical variety, with parts of the city transitioning into a humid continental climate, giving the city cool, wet winters and hot, humid summers with plentiful rainfall all year round.

In September 1821, a hurricane moved up the east coast of the United States, producing a 13 ft (4.0 m) rise of water – storm surge – in the span of one hour at Battery Park. Water levels reached as far inland as Canal Street. The next hurricane in the city was in August 1893, which knocked down power and telegraph lines, and destroyed several houses. During Hurricane Hazel in 1954, winds at The Battery reached 113 mph (182 km/h). A nor'easter in December 1992 produced record high tides, with a water level of 8.04 ft (2.45 m) at The Battery. Floods inundated low-lying areas, and at least 50 cars on Franklin D. Roosevelt East River Drive required rescue. The 1992 storm was surpassed by former Hurricane Sandy in October 2012, which rose water levels to 14.06 ft (4.29 m) above the average low tide. Floodwaters covered about 17% of New York City, imparting about $19 billion in damage, including $5 billion to transportation infrastructure. The floods affected the homes of more than 443,000 people and more than 23,400 businesses. There were 43 deaths in the city related to Sandy. In September 2021, former Hurricane Ida set a rainfall record when it dropped 3.15 inches (8.0 cm) of precipitation in one hour. The storm killed 13 people in the city, several of them due to drowning in basement apartments. Floods also shut down roads and the subway.

The hottest day on record in the city was July 9, 1936, when Central Park recorded a high temperature of 106 °F (41 °C). A heat wave in August 1896 killed 1,500 people in the city. The coldest day on record was February 9, 1934, with a temperature of −15 °F (−26 °C). In March 1888, a blizzard dropped 21 in (530 mm) of snowfall, killing 200 people across the city. A tropical storm in 1882 dropped 8.28 in (210 mm) of rainfall on September 23, which was the wettest calendar day on record, going back to 1869. A January 2016 blizzard dropped 30.5 in (77 cm) of snowfall at JFK airport, the highest amount recorded from a single storm. There have been at least 12 tornadoes in the city since 1974.

== Ecosystems ==
As New York City grew into a city, the surrounding environment was altered by the growing demands of the human population. The ecosystem of New York City is consistently maintained to support a growing population in the city. In the last 400 years since the original ecological systems as researched by the Mannahatta Project, the growth and development of the New York City water supply system, the New York City waste management system, Transportation in New York City, and Food and water in New York City has greatly altered the environment of New York City.

In 2017, CCNY entomologist and Professor of Biology David Lohman discovered a new species of fly living in Central Park. The fly, Themira lohmanus, has evolved to only breed on duck dung.

== Pollution ==
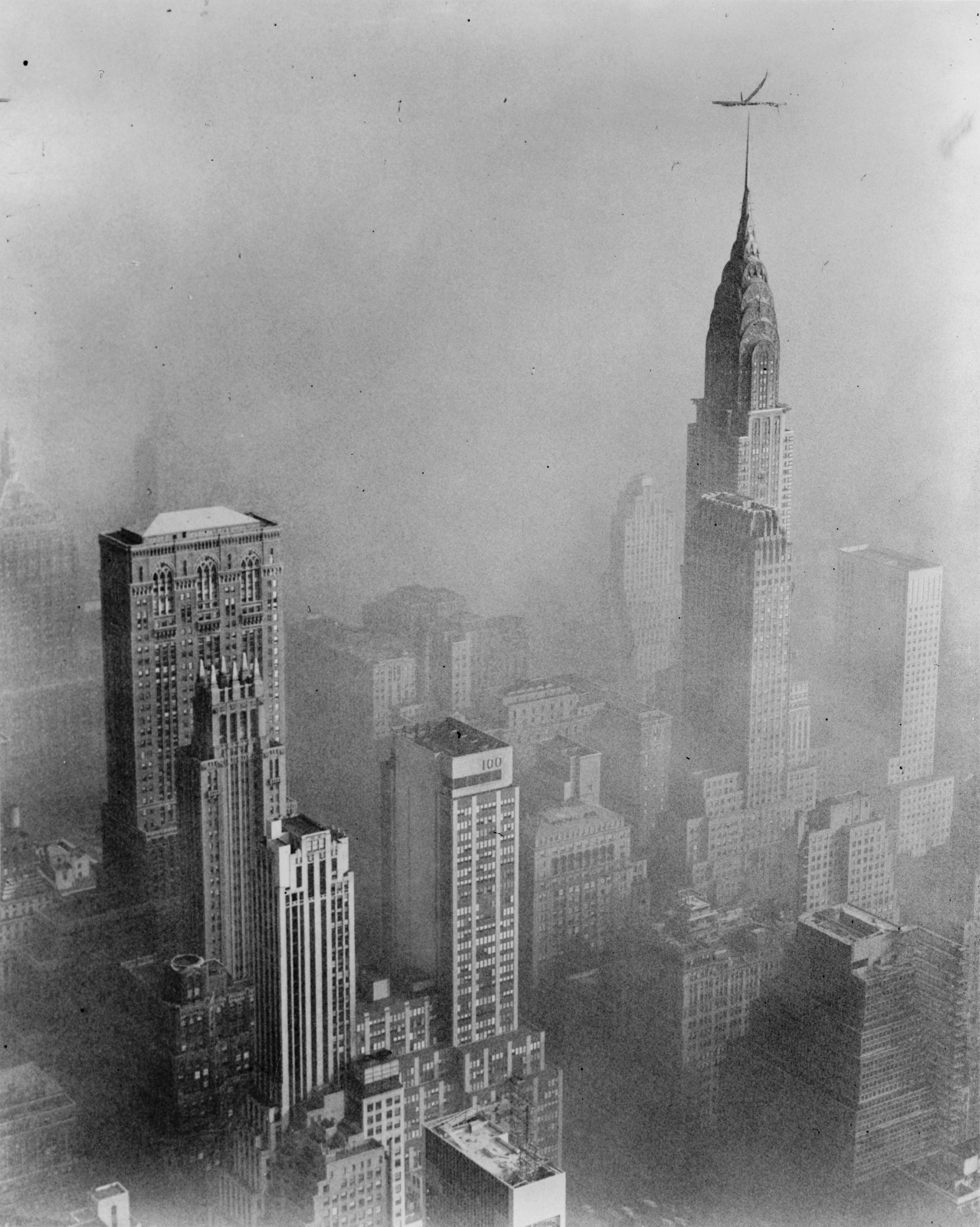
A view toward the Chrysler Building from the Empire State Building during a six-day smog in November 1953, estimated to have caused at least 200 deaths.

New York's population density has environmental pros and cons. It facilitates the highest mass transit use in the United States, but also concentrates pollution. Gasoline consumption in the city is at the rate the national average was in the 1920s, and greenhouse gas emissions are a fraction of the national average, at 7.1 metric tons per person per year, below San Francisco, at 11.2 metric tons, and the national average, at 24.5 metric tons. New York City accounts for only 1% of United States greenhouse gas emissions while housing 2.7% of its population.

== Waste management ==
New York City's waste management system is a refuse removal system primarily run by the New York City Department of Sanitation (DSNY). The department maintains the waste collection infrastructure and hires public and private contractors who remove the city's waste. This waste, created by New York City's population of more than eight million, can amount to more than ten thousand tons a day.

Waste management has been an issue for New York City since its New Amsterdam days. As a 1657 New Amsterdam ordinance states, “It has been found, that within this City of Amsterdam in New Netherland many burghers and inhabitants throw their rubbish, filth, ashes, dead animals and suchlike things into the public streets to the great inconvenience of the community".

== Horticulture ==
The Lenape peoples who inhabited the greater NYC area directly prior to European colonization cultivated the environment and land they lived on in New York City, historians believe they planted sunflowers at the edges of the maize fields alongside their villages. In addition, they relied on the many trees growing on what is now New York City for food, shelter, tool materials, fuel, and medicine. The typical Lenape house, called a longhouse, relied on the bending of the trunks taken from small trees to create a series of arches to serve as the frame. The Lenape used the Zanthoxylum americanum tree as medicine for toothaches because chewing on the leaves or bark creates a tingling, or numbing effect in the mouth.

== See also ==
- Environmental issues in New York City
- Rats in New York City
- Food and water in New York City
- Trees of New York City
- Wildlife in the Bronx
- Lower Manhattan Coastal Resiliency
- Birding in New York City
- New York City Department of Environmental Protection
- Oysters in New York City
