= Wildlife of the Bronx =

Parks and islands in the Bronx: 1–Van Cortlandt Park; 2–Woodlawn Cemetery; 3–Bronx Park; 4–Pelham Bay Park; 5–Orchard Beach; 6–City Island; 7–Hart Island; 8–Soundview Park; and 9–Brother Islands.

The New York City borough of the Bronx is one of the most densely populated places in the United States, but is home to a wide range of wildlife. The borough has a land area of 42 sq mi (110 km^{2}), of which 24 percent is parkland. Most of the open area (Van Cortlandt Park, Woodlawn Cemetery, Bronx Park, and Pelham Bay Park) is in the northern section of the borough, adjacent to Westchester County, allowing easy migration of animals from the mainland. The tree canopy of the Bronx cover 25% of the land area, hosting a wide range of avian species.

There is no universally accepted definition for "wildlife". This article focuses on animal species which are not commonly found in an urban environment. Such animals are numerous enough that the Parks Department has a full-time wildlife manager in their Bronx headquarters.

== Mammals ==
=== Deer ===
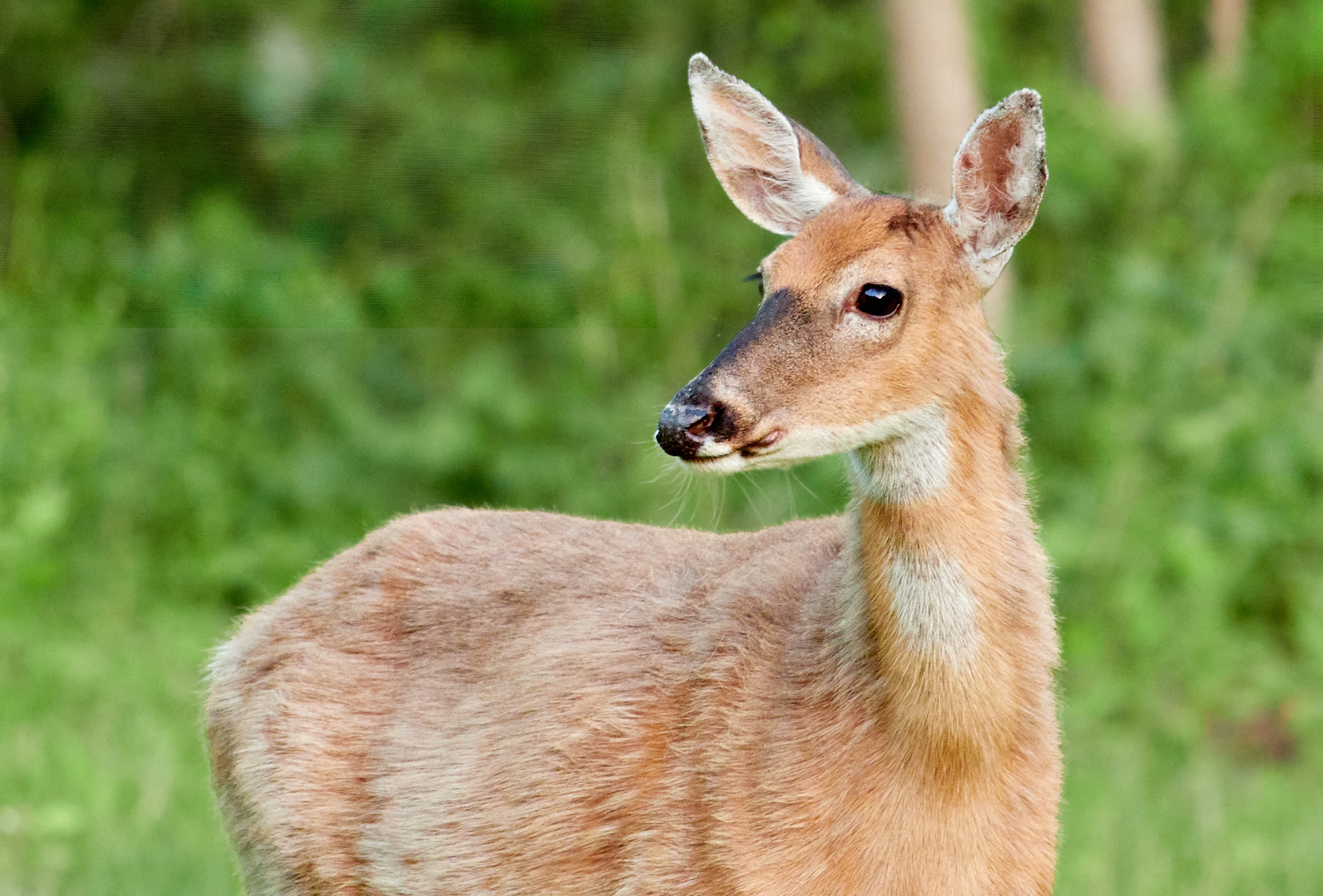
White-tailed deer in Pelham Bay Park

The Bronx hosts a population of whitetail deer, mostly in the wooded areas Van Cortlandt Park and Pelham Bay Park, where the animals have migrated into from Westchester County. They have also been seen on nearby City Island. Deer can be hazardous to human populations due to collisions with vehicles, by overgrazing and eating desired vegetation, and as a carrier of disease via ticks. Although hunting is illegal anywhere in New York City, deer hunting platforms have been found in Pelham Bay Park. In 2014, the Department of Parks and Recreation conducted a week-long aerial survey of the deer population in Van Cortlandt Park, Pelham Bay Park, Fort Independence Park, and Riverdale. The survey used an infra-red camera mounted on an airplane flying at 1000 feet. The $19,000 cost also included coverage at 12 parks on Staten Island. The survey revealed 18 deer in the Bronx, split equally between Pelham Bay and Van Cortlandt Parks, and 763 on Staten Island.

=== Coyotes ===
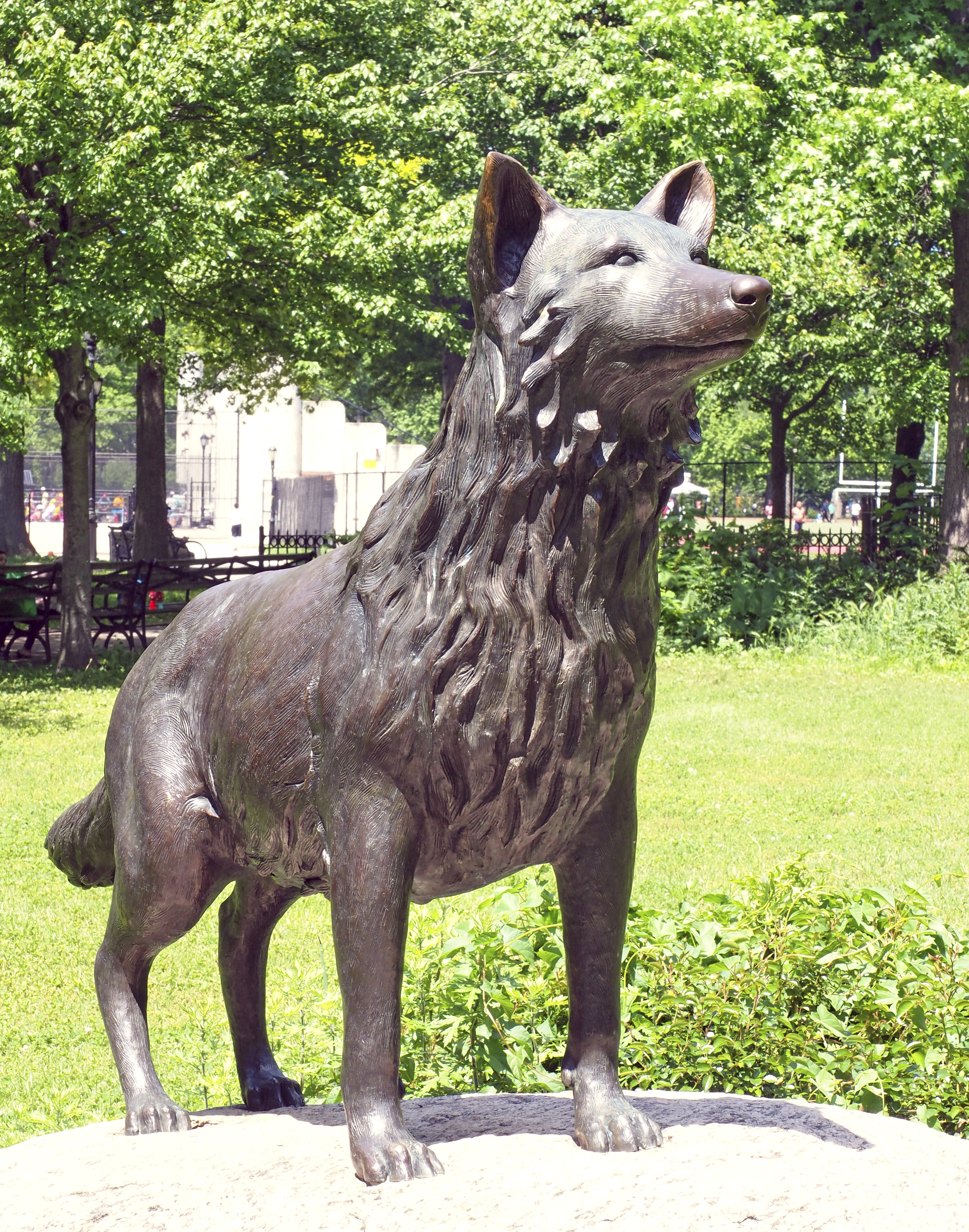
"Major" the coyote statue.

Coyotes historically did not inhabit the northeast United States. They were first seen in New York State in the 1940s, in Westchester County in the 1970s, and first sighted in the Bronx in the late 1990s. Stable breeding populations were established in three parks in the Bronx by approximately 2012. The first documented sightings were in February 1995, when two dead females were found. The first had been struck and killed by a vehicle on the Major Deagan Expressway, and the second was found in Van Cortlandt Park a week later, having been shot. It is believed that a third individual was in the adjacent Woodlawn Cemetery in October 1994. A commemorative bronze statue, named Major, was erected in 1998 in Van Cortlandt Park. Coyotes typically inhabit a 2 sq mi (5.2 km^{2}) territory, and will travel 3–10 mi (5–16 km) in a day.

A 2011 survey using automated cameras photographed coyotes in Ferry Point Park, Pelham Bay Park, Pugsley Creek Park, Van Cortlandt Park, and Riverdale. Surveys in 2012 through 2014 confirmed the presence of coyotes in all those locations as well as in Bronx Park. In 2024, coyotes were reported in Claremont Park.

A coyote killed by a vehicle on Jerome Avenue was stuffed and is on display at the Bronx headquarters of the New York City Parks Department.

=== Beaver ===
North American beaver were once endemic in the New York City area but disappeared in the early 19th century due to being trapped for their fur and deforestation reducing their habitat. The first known sighting of a beaver in the city since that time was in 2007, when one built a lodge along the Bronx River, near the Bronx Zoo. The lodge was reported to be 12 ft (3.7 m) long and 4 ft (1.2 m) tall. The animal was nicknamed José after José Serrano, a member of the US House of Representatives from the South Bronx who had been instrumental in obtaining federal funds to clean up the Bronx River. A second beaver, named Justin (after Justin Bieber), was seen in the area in 2010. Typical beaver lifetimes in the wild are 10–12 years.

== Birds ==
The Bronx is situated along the Atlantic Flyway, a major route for migrating birds. A wide range pass through during migrations, in addition to those that nest, winter, or reside year-round. 304 species have been reported to the Cornell Lab of Ornithology as of June 2022. In 1924, nine boys including Allan D. Cruickshank and Joseph Hickey, founded the Bronx County Bird Club. The Bronx is home to a surprising variety of bird species, including green heron, wild turkey, cliff swallow, blue-gray gnatcatcher, marsh wren, wood thrush, and orchard oriole.

The Bronx is also the site of several harbor heron nesting colonies: Goose Island, and North and South Brother Islands; however, these islands are not open to the public. Pelham Bay Park has been designated as an Important Bird Area (IBA) by National Audubon, with over 250 species and 80 nesting species having been recorded there. The New York Botanical Garden has attracted a reported 229 species, with nesting species including green heron, great horned owl, and ruby-throated hummingbird. Other hotspots include Crotona Park, Pugsley Creek Park, and Soundview Park.

=== Wild turkeys ===
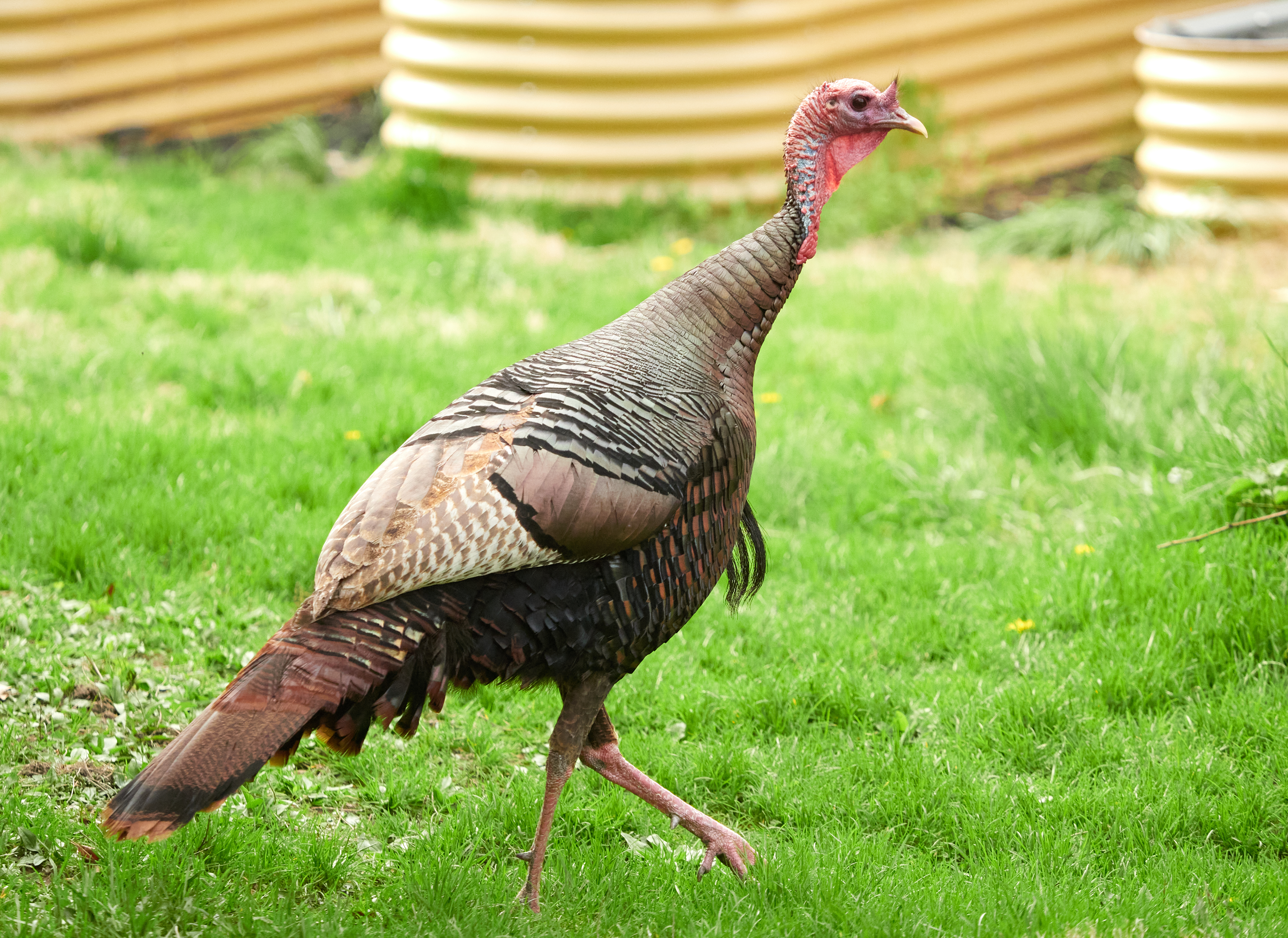
Eastern wild turkey in a residential backyard on City Island

Wild turkeys were common in the New York City area during colonial times. By the 1840s, however, the turkey population had been exterminated by hunting and loss of their native habitat. Turkeys first returned to western New York State around 1948 when they began to migrate from northern Pennsylvania. In 1959, the New York State Conservation Department began to actively reintroduce turkeys to areas across the state. The first wild turkey hunting season in modern times was also held in 1959, limited to Allegany and Cattaraugus counties. As of 2005, turkey hunting is allowed in all 55 upstate counties (i.e. north of the Bronx-Westchester border).

Turkeys prefer a wooded habitat, including wooded swamps, and a mix of wooded and open areas. Such habitats are available in Van Cortlandt and Pelham Bay parks. Although capable of flying, turkeys mostly travel by walking or running and can cover up to 5 miles a day on foot. It is believed that the first turkeys in the Bronx during modern times walked south in the 1990s from Westchester County along roads such as the Bronx River Parkway which have adjacent wooded areas. As of 2002, turkeys are resident in the Bronx year-round.

=== Ospreys ===
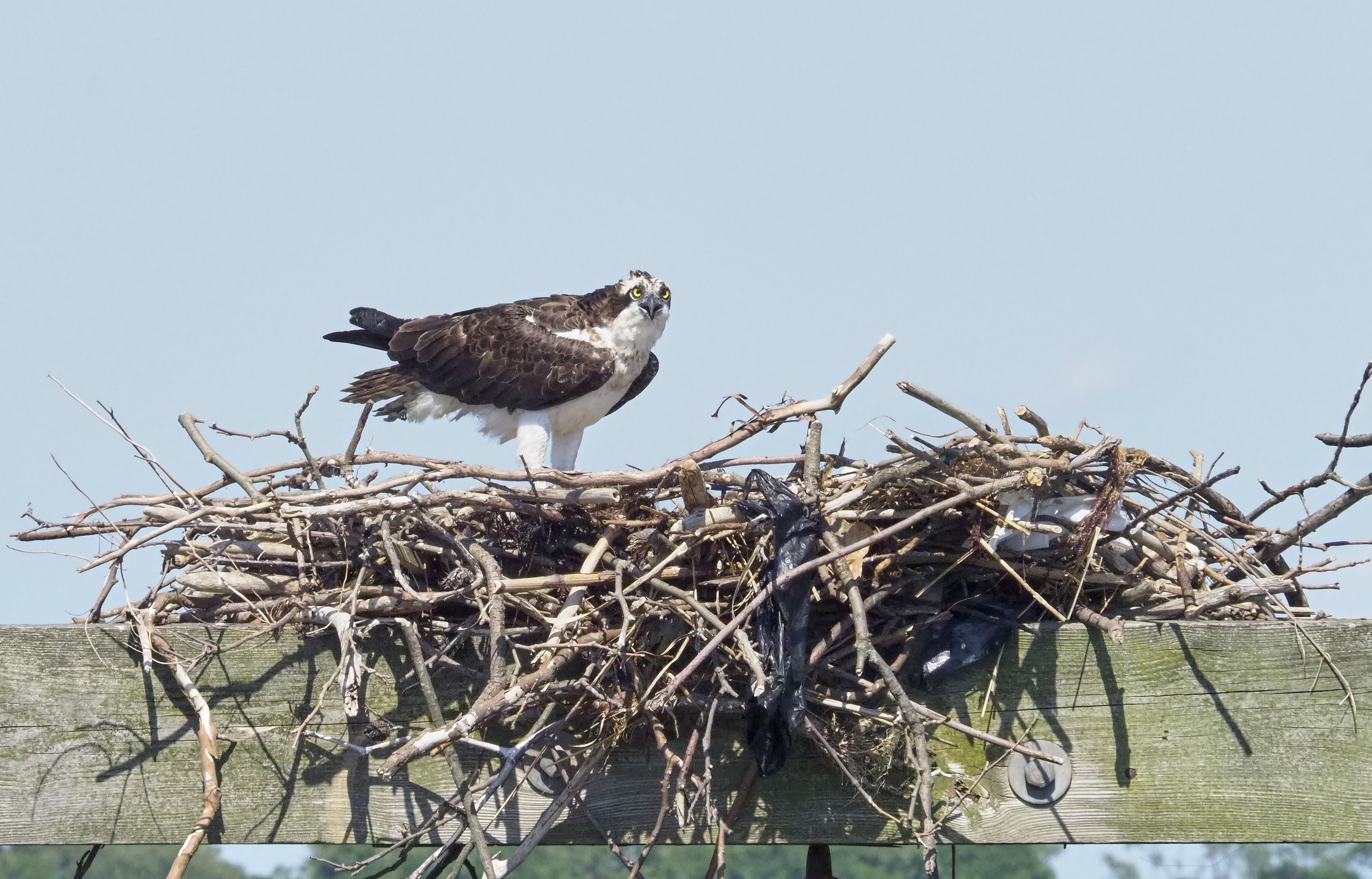
Osprey on its nest built atop pilings off City Island, adjacent to Pelham Bay Park.

Ospreys inhabit areas of the Bronx near water. Nesting places include Pelham Bay Park, Soundview Park, and the Brother Islands. The Audubon hawk watch in the Pelham Bay area has yielded some of the highest osprey counts of anywhere in the United States.

=== Monk parakeets ===
Pelham Bay Park is home to escaped monk parakeets.

== Insects ==
South of Orchard Beach in Pelham Bay Park is a 25-acre (10 ha) meadow that hosts the only known population of the moth subspecies Amphipoea erepta ryensis.

== See also ==
- Rats in New York City
- Birding in New York City
- Trees of New York City
- Environment of New York City
