= Sydney S. Cohen =

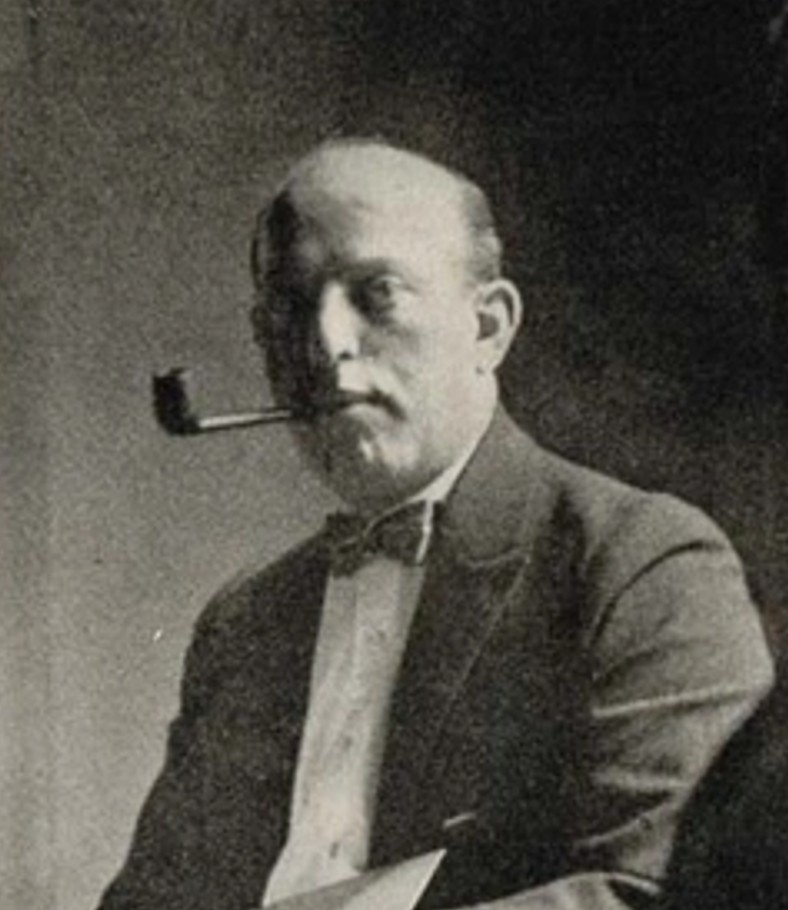
Sydney S. Cohen in 1921

Sydney S. Cohen (c. 1879 – December 12, 1935) was an American motion picture theater executive and industry advocate, known as the founding president of the Motion Picture Theater Owners of America (MPTOA) and for his critical role in establishing the Apollo Theater in Harlem as a center of African American entertainment.

== Early life and education ==
Cohen was born in the Lower East Side of New York City. He attended City College and New York University.

== Early career ==
Cohen began as an independent theater owner in New York City in the early 20th century, where he worked to establish fair practices within the motion picture industry. By 1912, he helped organize local exhibitors into trade groups to advocate for better regulation, consistent standards, and fair access to film content. In the late 1910s, Cohen led the New York chapter of the Motion Picture Exhibitors League of America (MPELA). He later merged the MPELNY with the newly formed Independent Exhibitors of America (IEA).

== MPTOA leadership (1920–1925) ==
In June 1920, Cohen was elected president of the newly consolidated Motion Picture Theater Owners of America, a national organization representing independent film exhibitors. Cohen led the MPTOA through a period of major studio consolidation and conflicts over booking practices. Cohen advocated for paid executive leadership within the MPTOA and warned of fragmentation if exhibitor voices were not united in the face of studio dominance. He was reelected president of the organization in 1923. Cohen initially stated that he would not seek reelection, however decided to run after concerns about Henry Ford’s attempts to take control of movie theaters nationwide for purposes of promoting his campaign for the United States presidency.

During Cohen’s term as president and throughout his career, he advocated against censorship, once stating “It is not reasonable that the American people should be obliged to read only and see only and hear only things that some other person or official designated or otherwise acting feels disposed to permit them to enjoy."

== Advocacy before the FTC ==
In 1927, Cohen testified before the Federal Trade Commission (FTC), calling for enforcement of a cease-and-desist order against Famous Players–Lasky Corporation (a precursor to Paramount Pictures) for monopolistic practices. He urged that production companies be required to divest their ownership of theaters, except in major cities where first-run films debuted.

Cohen also opposed so-called "triple block booking," a practice where exhibitors were required to purchase large blocks of films from multiple producers. He described the tactic as coercive and a threat to independent theater operators and consumer choice.

== The Apollo Theater ==
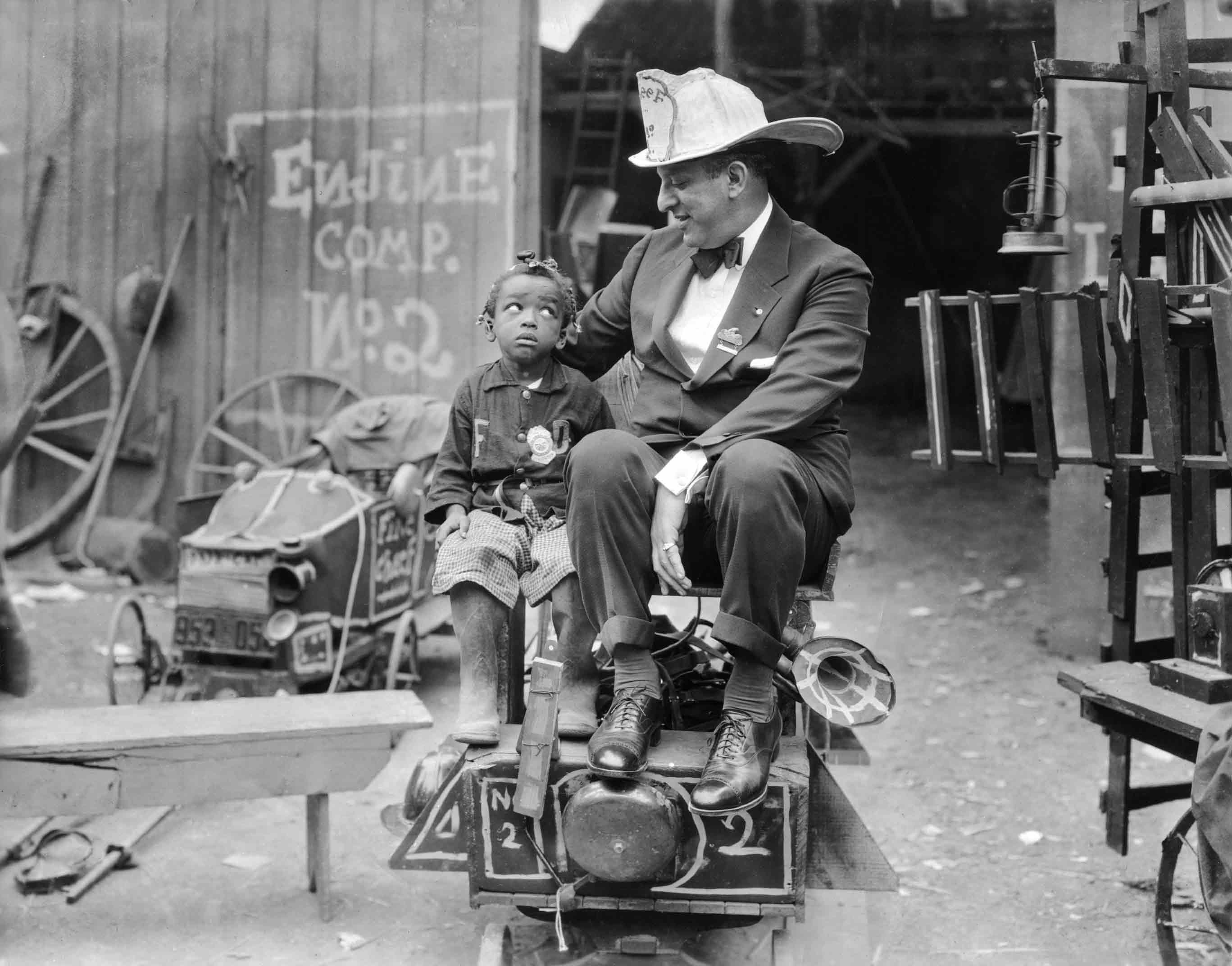
Sydney S. Cohen and Allen Hoskins (left) in 1926

In 1934, Cohen purchased the former Hurtig & Seamon's New Burlesque Theater at 253 West 125th Street in Harlem. At the time, the theater had a reputation for segregation, with few Black performers and poor conditions for Black audiences.

Cohen transformed the building into the Apollo Theater, the first major venue in Harlem specifically dedicated to live Black entertainment for Black audiences. He retained the name of a smaller earlier Apollo theater nearby and introduced high-fidelity RCA sound equipment. Additionally, during the mid-1930s, the theater was the only of its size to hire Black people as non-entertainer employees such as managers, directors, and technicians.

The theater was operated under a pooling arrangement between Cohen and Frank Schiffman, with Morris Sussman as manager. John Hammond later assisted in booking acts. The Apollo was opened on January 26, 1934, seating 1,500 people. All proceeds from the opening day were donated to the Fresh Air Fund of Harlem, a "summer program for children from underserved communities."

Entertainment at the theater included comedy acts, cartoons and movies, play productions, and a wide variety of musicians. In its early years, the Apollo hosted top talent such as Ethel Waters, Bessie Smith, and Ralph Cooper, who originated the now-famous Amateur Night. Cooper also introduced the custom of touching a mounted piece of the historic Tree of Hope for luck before going onstage.

== Death and legacy ==
Sydney S. Cohen died of a heart attack on December 12, 1935. The New York Times published his obituary, describing him as a leading advocate for exhibitors and a champion of fair business practices.

After his death, the Apollo Theater was sold to Frank Schiffman and Leo Brecher. Under Schiffman’s management, the Apollo became a cornerstone of African American culture.
