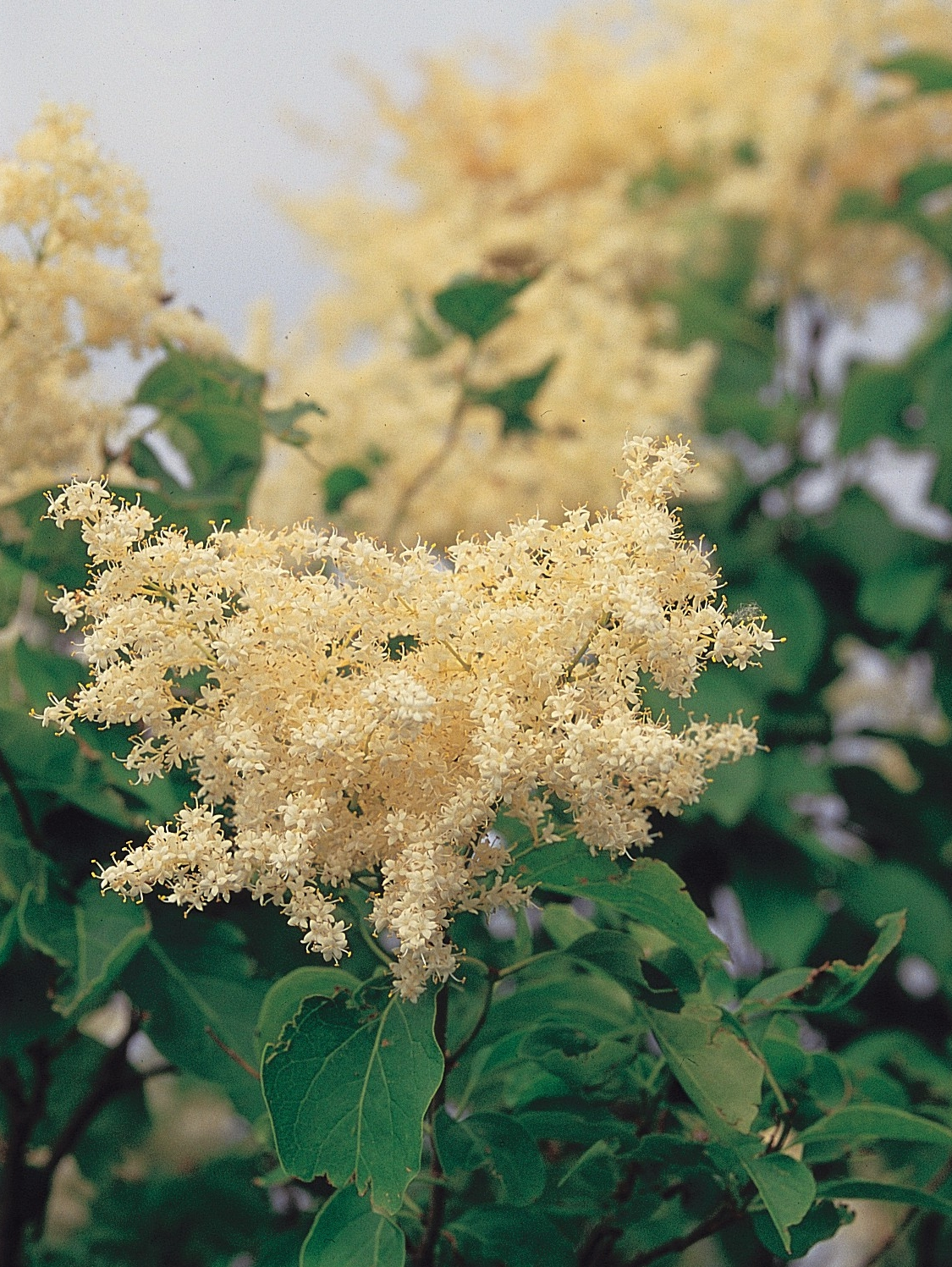

Conservation status
- Least Concern (IUCN 3.1)

Scientific classification
- Kingdom: Plantae
- Clade: Tracheophytes
- Clade: Angiosperms
- Clade: Eudicots
- Clade: Asterids
- Order: Lamiales
- Family: Oleaceae
- Genus: Syringa
- Species: S. reticulata

Binomial name
- Syringa reticulata (Blume) H.Hara

= Syringa reticulata =

Japanese tree lilac

Species of flowering plant

Syringa reticulata, the Japanese tree lilac, is a species of flowering plant in the family Oleaceae. It is native to eastern Asia, and is grown as an ornamental in Europe and North America.

== Description ==
It is a deciduous small tree growing to a height of 12 m (39 ft), rarely to 15 m (49 ft), with a trunk up to 30 cm (12 in), rarely 40 cm (16 in) in diameter; it is the largest species of lilac, and the only one that regularly makes a small tree rather than a shrub. The leaves are elliptic-acute, 2.5–15 cm (0.98–5.91 in) long and 1–8 cm (0.39–3.15 in) broad, with an entire margin, and a roughish texture with slightly impressed veins. The flowers are white or creamy-white, the corolla with a tubular base 0.16–0.24" (4–6 mm) long and a four-lobed apex 0.12–0.24" (3–6 mm) across, and a strong fragrance; they are produced in broad panicles 5–30 cm (2.0–11.8 in) long and 3–20 cm (1.2–7.9 in) broad in early summer. The fruit is a dry, smooth, brown capsule (15–25 mm long), splitting in two to release the two winged seeds.

Their flowers produce a privet-like, honey-like smell, unlike common lilac (Syringa vulgaris). In the fall, the leaves take on a yellow-green color.

== Distribution ==
Syringa reticulata is found in northern Japan (mainly Hokkaidō), northern China (Gansu, Hebei, Heilongjiang, Henan, Jilin, Liaoning, Nei Mongol, Ningxia, Shaanxi, Shanxi, Sichuan), Korea, and far southeastern Russia (Primorye).

== Names ==
Chinese: 暴馬丁香; pinyin: Bào mǎ dīngxiāng; Japanese: ハシドイ (丁香花), romanized: hashidoi

The Latin specific epithet reticulata means "netted".

== Subspecies ==
There are three subspecies:

- Syringa reticulata subsp. reticulata (syn. Syringa japonica (Maxim.), also syn. S. amurensis var japonica (Maxim.) Franch et Sav.- Ligustrina japonica (Maxim.) ) - Japan.
- Syringa reticulata subsp. amurensis (Rupr.) P.S.Green & M.C.Chang (syn. S. reticulata var. mandschurica (Maxim.) H.Hara) - Northeastern China, Korea, southeastern Russia.
- Syringa reticulata subsp. pekinensis (Rupr.) P.S.Green & M.C.Chang - North-central China. It has very distinct reddish-brown peeling bark.
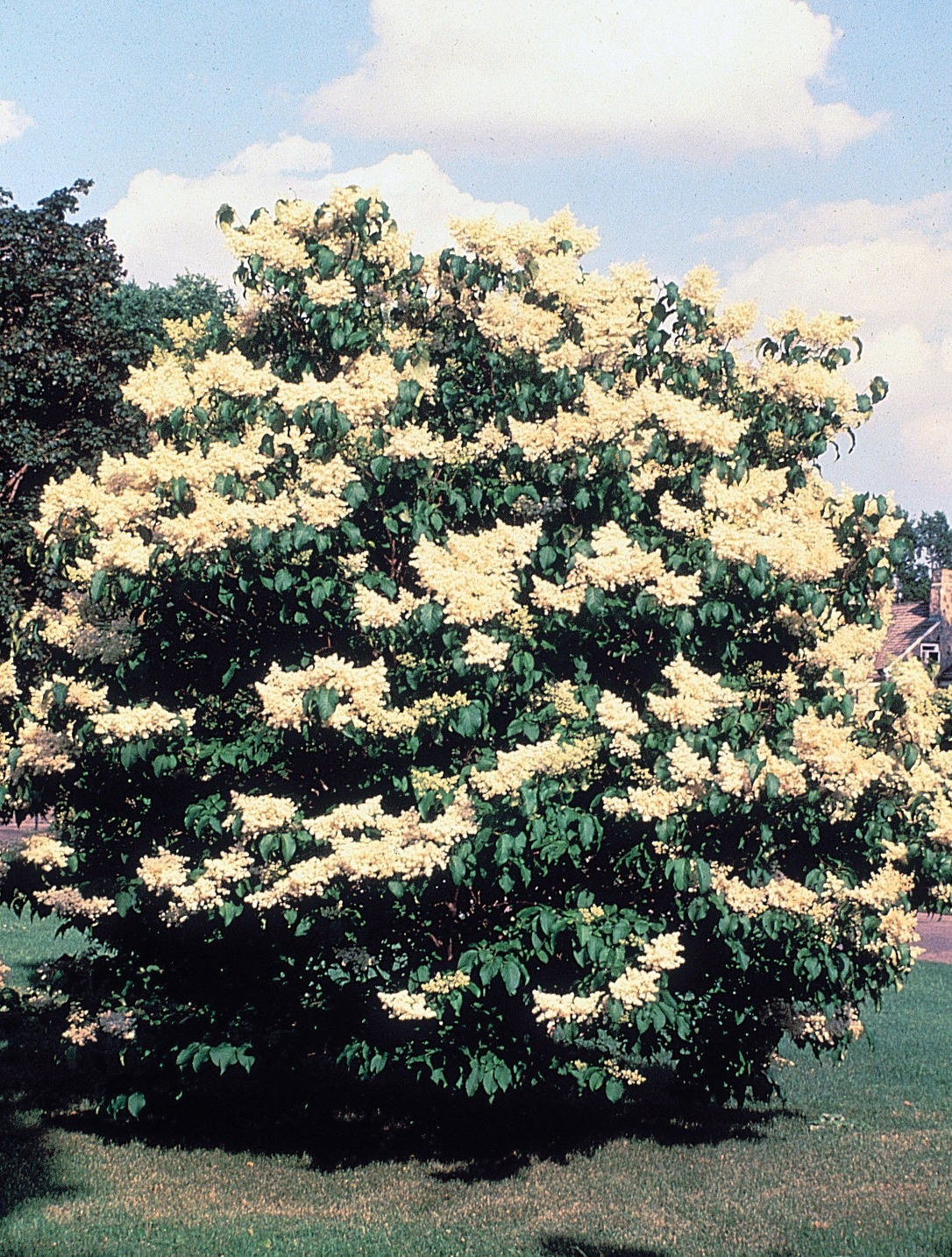

== Usages ==
=== Landscaping ===
Due to its ability to support many soils (including dry, alkaline soils and rock salts), it is often used in urban areas all around North America. Although not a native plant in many of these areas, it is able to attract many pollinators.

=== Medicine ===
The flowers of the tree have been used in Traditional Chinese medicine. Their antioxidant, anti-inflammatory, and other properties have been studied.
