= Magnolia 'Butterflies' =

Hybrid cultivar

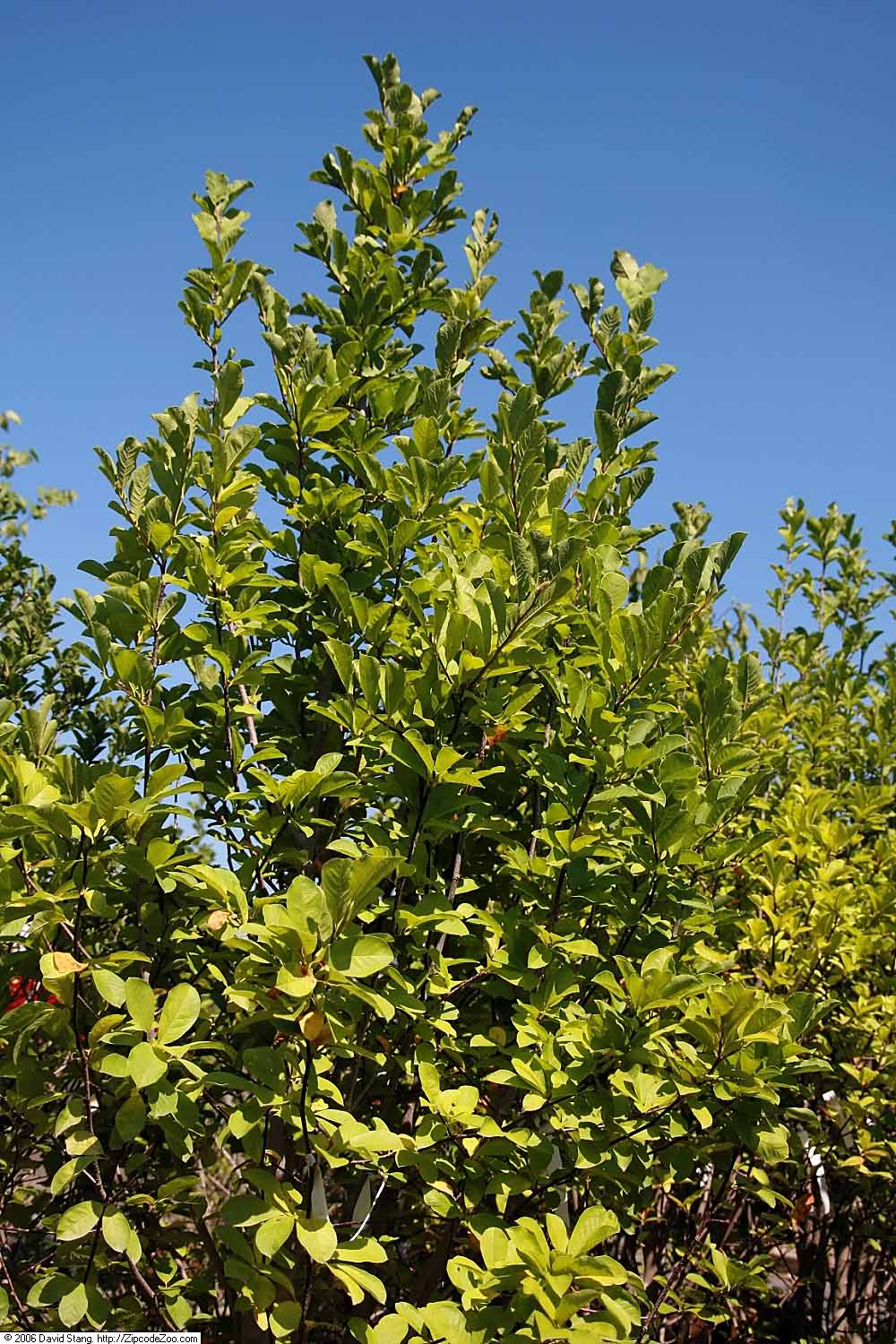
- For sale in a garden center in Virginia
- Genus: Magnolia
- Hybrid parentage: Magnolia acuminata × M. denudata
- Cultivar: 'Butterflies'

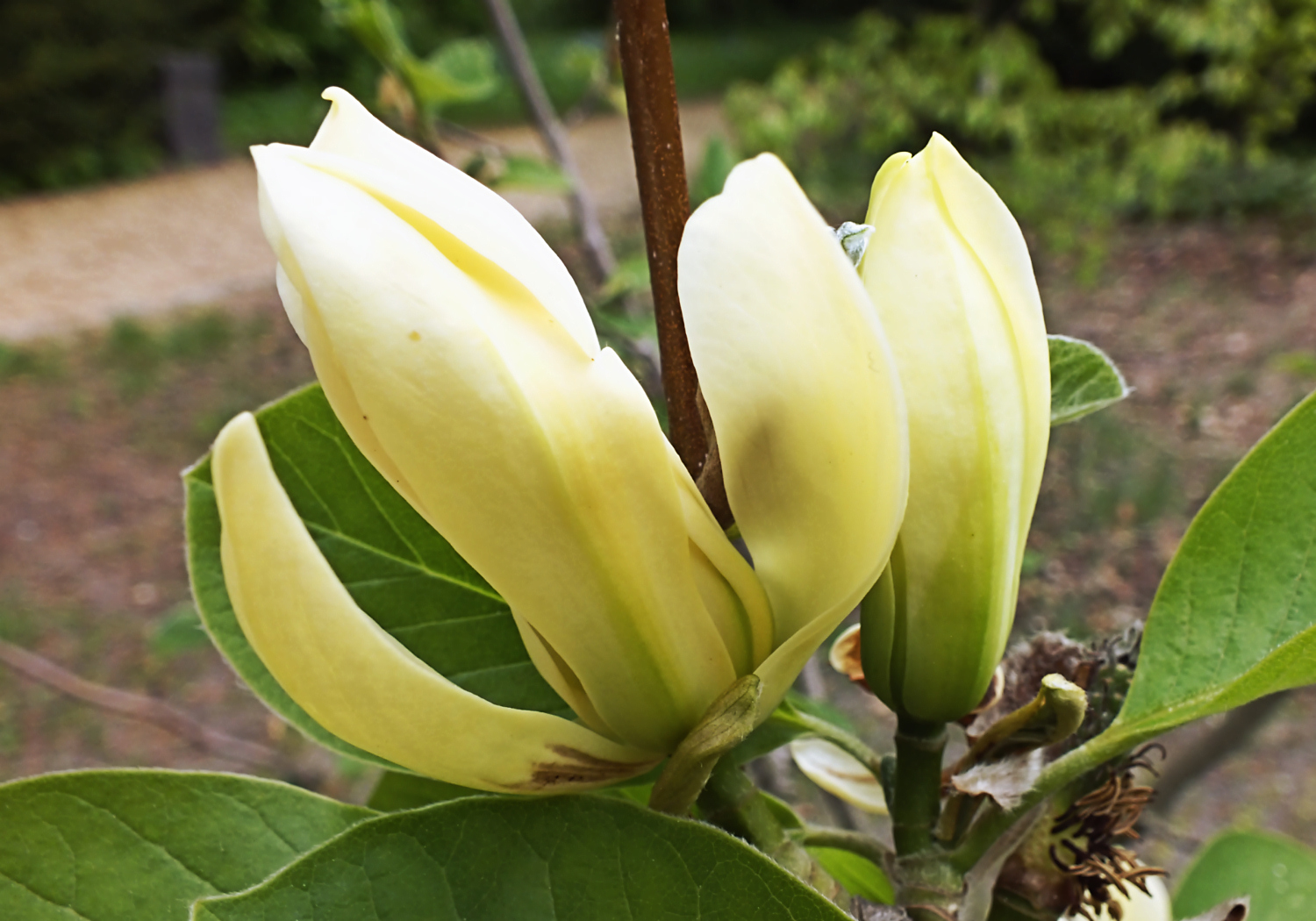
Flower

Magnolia 'Butterflies' is a hybrid Magnolia that is the offspring of a cross between the cucumbertree Magnolia acuminata (seed parent) and the Yulan magnolia Magnolia denudata (pollen parent). Its Plant Patent was granted in 1991.

Magnolia 'Butterflies' is a deciduous tree typically 15 to 20 ft (5 to 6 m) tall, spreading to 10 to 15 ft (3 to 5 m) wide, and hardy in USDA zones 5 through 9. It is widely available from commercial suppliers. Unlike species magnolias, it is approved for planting in New York City streets and parks.
