= Grand Bois (loa) =

Haitian vodou deity

Grand Bois (meaning great wood, also Grans Bwa, Bran Bwa, Ganga-Bois; Haitian Creole: Gran Bwa) is an elemental, nature-oriented loa closely associated with trees, plants, and herbs in Haitian Vodou. Offerings to him include leaves and herbs, honey, and spiced rum. As a petro loa and loa of the wilderness, he can be fierce and unpredictable in some aspects.

Grand Bois, Maître Carrefour (Master Crossroads), and Baron Cimetière (Baron Cemetery) form the triad of magicians. They represent the journey of life: Grand Bois represents the rich earth that you spring from and the dark woods you stumble through, Maitre Carrefour represents the various roads and paths you choose to travel on, and Baron Cimitère represents the end of the trip.

Grand Bois is represented by Saint Sebastian as his Catholic counterpart. His colors are commonly shades of green (sometimes including red in some houses).

== See also ==
- Leshy
