= Syringa reticulata subsp. pekinensis =

Scientific classification
- Kingdom: Plantae
- Clade: Embryophytes
- Clade: Tracheophytes
- Clade: Spermatophytes
- Clade: Angiosperms
- Clade: Eudicots
- Clade: Asterids
- Order: Lamiales
- Family: Oleaceae
- Genus: Syringa
- Species: S. reticulata
- Subspecies: S. r. subsp. pekinensis

Trinomial name
- Syringa reticulata subsp. pekinensis (Rupr.) P.S.Green & M.C.Chang

Subspecies of shrub

Syringa reticulata subsp. pekinensis (formerly known as Syringa pekinensis), also known as the Pekin lilac or the Chinese tree lilac, grows in an open, multi-stemmed form to a height of 15 to 20 feet (4.6 to 6.1 m), with a spread of 10 to 15 feet (3.0 to 4.6 m). They are native to northern China but grow in USDA hardiness zones 3 through 7. It is grown as an ornamental tree in Europe and North America.

== Description ==
Pekin lilacs have arching branches and ovate dark green leaves that are 2 to 4 inches (51 to 102 mm) long. They have yellowish-white flowers that bloom in panicles up to 6 inches (150 mm) long. The panicles change over to loose clusters of brown capsules. The bark is a red-brown color. They grow well in moist, well-drained soil. They prefer full sun but will tolerate light shade.
