= Food system in New York City =

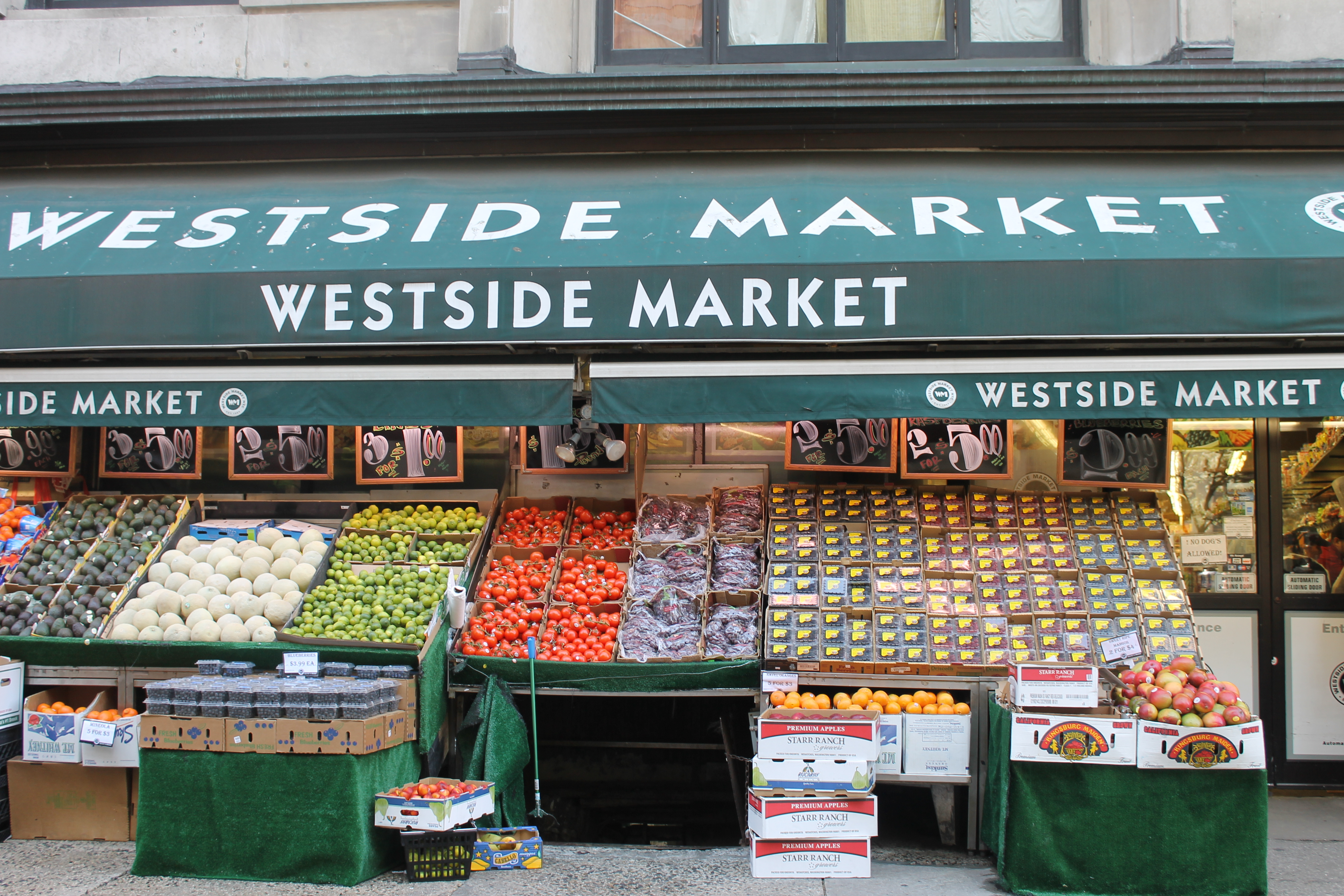
A selection of produce outside a grocery store on the Upper West Side

In New York City, there is an extensive water supply system that supports several programs and infrastructure pertaining to the city's food supply. City officials, agencies, and organizations cooperate with rural farmers to grow food more locally, as well as protect waterways in the New York metropolitan area. The New York City Department of Education operates a school-time and summertime breakfast/lunch program. The city is also deprived of supermarkets in several neighborhoods, and the city government has addressed the problem by allowing extra street vendors to operate. To encourage food safety, the government also operates a restaurant-grading system that it introduced in 2010. The various food programs have made the city a model for food systems internationally.

== Watershed protection and local food ==
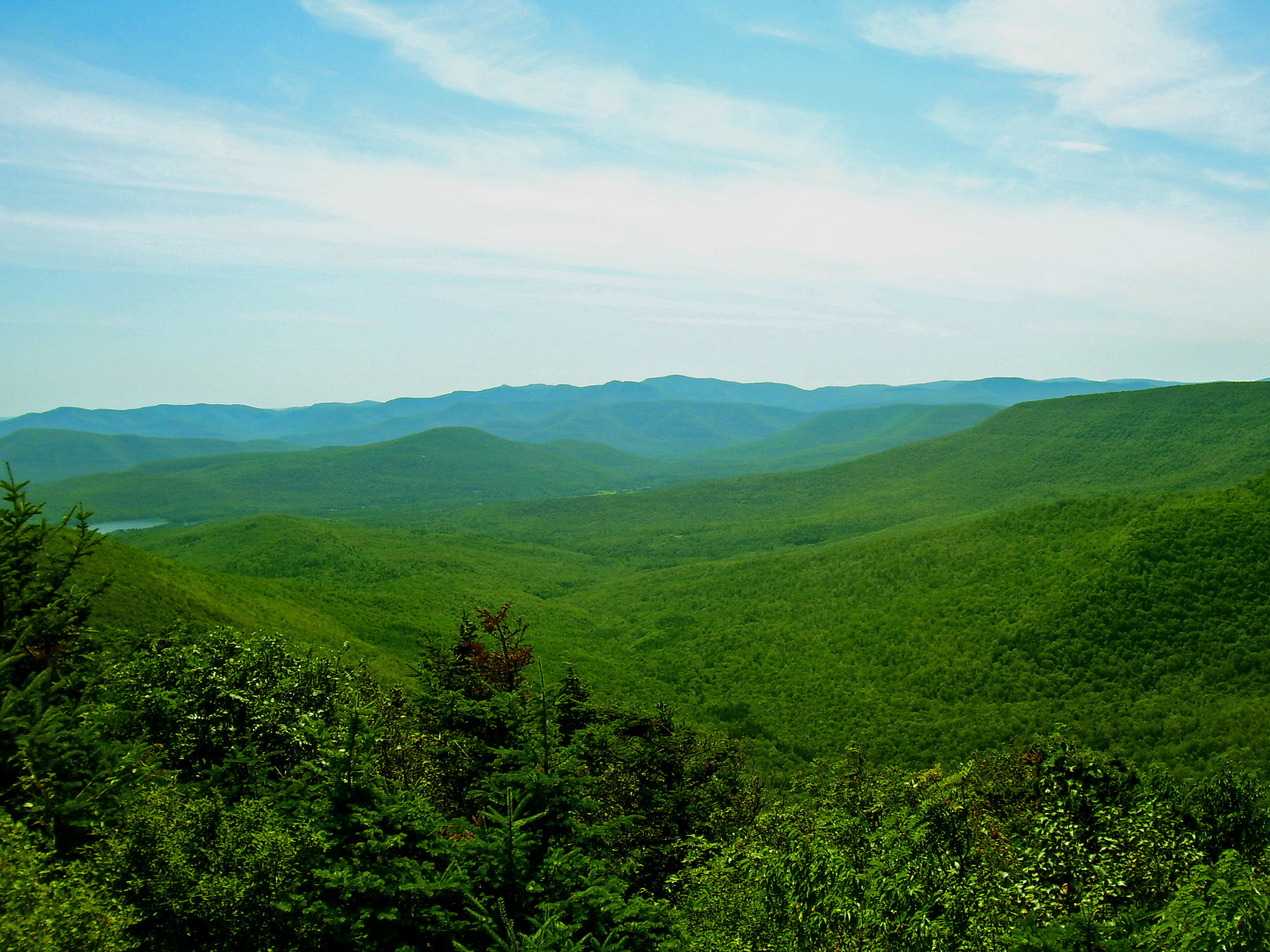
The Catskill Mountains watershed, one of the major water sources for New York City

Government officials, labor organizers, non-profits, community advocacy groups, and residents are greatly dependent on rural farmers who develop New York City's local foodshed. The process of linking agriculture with the city's urban markets has been largely built upon the fact that the city water supply comes from the protected watersheds in Upstate New York. The water supply system, the largest surface storage and supply complex in the world, yields over 1 billion US gallons (3,800,000 m^{3}) of water daily, from upstate reservoirs. Two of the three supply systems (Catskill and Delaware) are unfiltered. These systems are protected by extensive watershed management programs that reduces nutrient pollution and pathogen contamination. However, the implementation of such stringent regulations is costly to New York State farmers. The Croton system, which supplies 10% of the city's water, has an engineered filtration system. All three systems have chlorination treatment, as well as ultraviolet disinfection treatment to control microorganisms such as giardia and cryptosporidium which are resistant to chlorine treatment.

=== Greenmarket ===
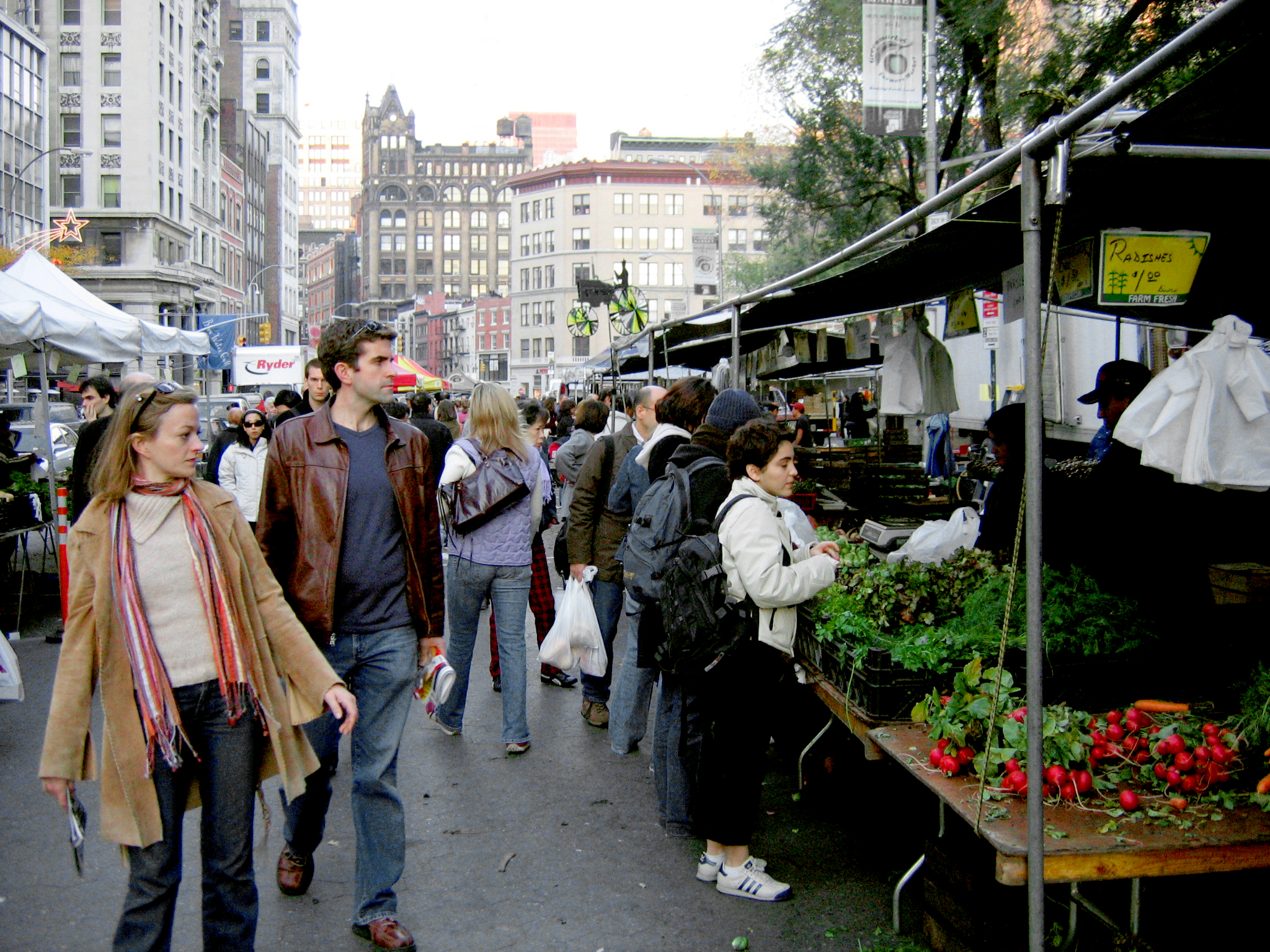
The Union Square Greenmarket

To protect the water supply from surface runoff and promote regional agriculture, rural and urban New Yorkers developed an alliance called the New York City Watershed Whole Farm Program, which promotes sustainable agriculture in New York State. With financial assistance from the city, upstate farmers implement nutrient management, pesticide management and related watershed management techniques to reduce runoff from their lands. The city's urban population serves as a local market for upstate farmers, particularly through Greenmarket, a farmer's market founded in 1976 by the Council on the Environment of New York City. Upstate farmers sell their products at Greenmarket locations.

Greenmarket provides regional small family farmers with opportunities to sell their fruits, vegetables and other farm products at open-air markets in the city. The program expanded to 45 markets in 2006—the largest expansion in its then-30-year history—but the resulting Greenmarket expansions were too small or too infrequently patronized to be profitable. The most famous Greenmarket location is the Union Square Greenmarket, held four days a week throughout the year. In 2003, 250,000 customers a week purchased 1,000 varieties of fruits and vegetables at the market.

=== School lunches ===
New York City provides over 40,000 meals a day to children through the SchoolFoods program. Most of the fruit served in public and charter schools operated by New York City Department of Education (NYCDOE) is local. A project to bring New York State apples to city school cafeterias has also increased fruit consumption among school children. As of 2007, policy work was focused on the task of bringing more local food to school lunches to give children healthy meals while supporting agriculture in the region. However, there was no plan to expand the program as of 2015.

The NYCDOE also has a summer-meals program operated by SchoolFoods, which offers free lunches to children under 18. These summer lunches are distributed at over 1,100 parks, pools, libraries, schools, and shelters every year. Over 7 million lunches were distributed in summer 2012.

After the beginning of the COVID 19 crisis in March 2020, NYCDOE offered "Grab and go" lunches at over 500 schools across the five boroughs to anyone who needed them.

== Food justice issues ==
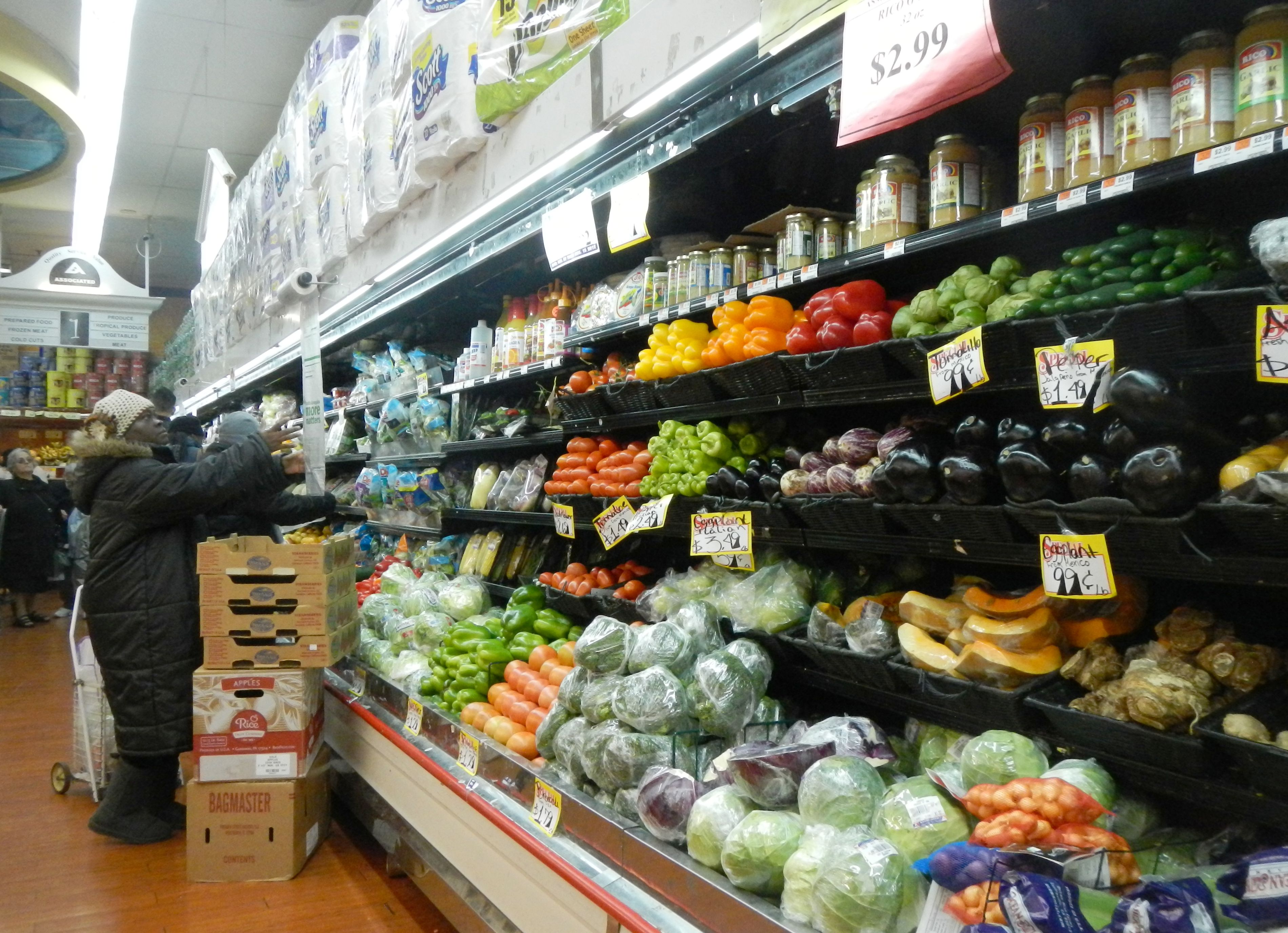
Inside a supermarket in East Harlem

New York City faces a supermarket shortage in several neighborhoods that is closely linked to health epidemics. At the request of the Mayor's office, the Department of City Planning studied supermarket need in the city. As a result, in April 2008, the Department found a widespread shortage of supermarkets, identifying several "food deserts." It identified food deserts as a key factor in why over 700,000 people in New York City had diabetes, over 1.1 million New Yorkers were obese, and another 2 million were overweight.

Health problems are especially prevalent in minority communities. For instance, supermarkets in predominantly-minority Harlem are 30 percent less common than on the predominantly-white Upper East Side; while 20 percent of Upper East Side bodegas carried leafy green vegetables, only 3 percent of those in Harlem did so. Three million New Yorkers live in neighborhoods with high need for grocery stores and supermarkets, such as Harlem and Washington Heights in Manhattan; Bushwick, East New York, and Sunset Park in Brooklyn; Corona, Jamaica, and Far Rockaway in Queens; the South Bronx, Williamsbridge, Wakefield, and Pelham Parkway in the Bronx; and St. George and Stapleton in Staten Island show the greatest need for full-line supermarkets.

In February 2008, City Council Speaker Christine Quinn announced the creation of a Statewide Supermarket Commission that would identify state and local policy solutions to expand supermarkets and keep them open. The Commission would be led by the Food Trust and the Food Bank for New York City, in partnership with the City's Food Policy Coordinator and the Food Industry Alliance. Simultaneously, the United Food and Commercial Workers Local 1500, which represents grocery store workers, worked to create healthy food options for all New Yorkers through supermarkets, community-supported agriculture, urban agriculture, and farmers' markets.

=== Green Cart program ===
As part of an ongoing effort to increase access to healthy foods, the city created 1,000 new "Green Cart" permits in 2008. These permits were meant for street vendors who exclusively sell fresh fruits and vegetables, which must be raw and whole. These permits can be used only in neighborhoods where 15% or more of the population reported having consumed zero servings of fruits or vegetables in the previous 24 hours. Local businesses initially opposed the initiative, but a reduction in the number of permits allowed the program to be signed into law. After the program was approved, the city received funding and support from several partners to help further the program.

A 2014 study by the Columbia University School of International and Public Affairs showed that although there were only 166 Green Carts in operation, these green carts were instrumental in raising exposure to healthy foods in poorer neighborhoods in Manhattan, the Bronx, Queens, and Brooklyn. The same study found that of these Green Carts, there were none on Staten Island.

== Restaurant grading system ==
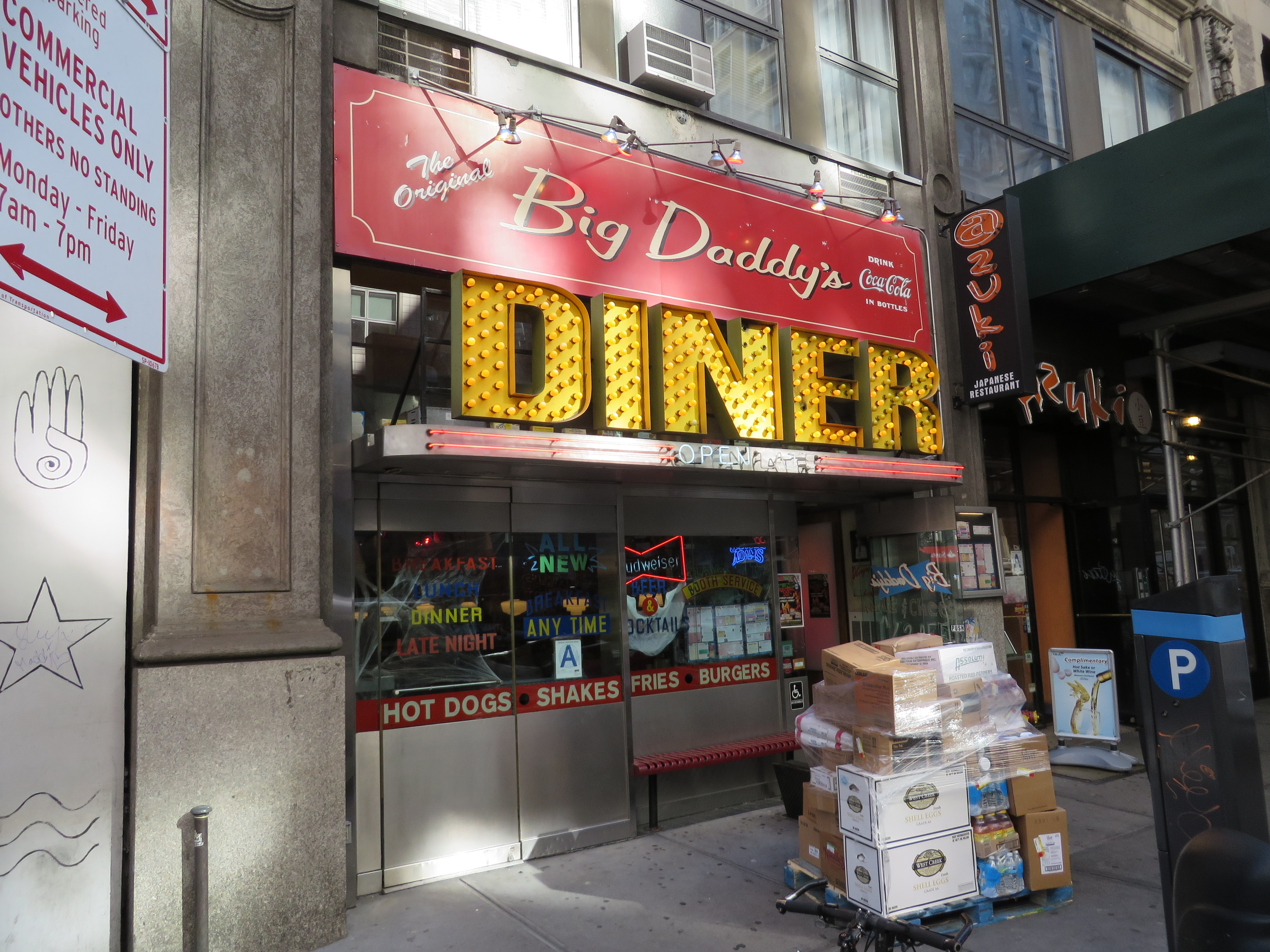
Big Daddy's Diner in Manhattan with an "A" grade displayed in the window

A grading system for New York City's 24,000 restaurants was launched in July 2010. Restaurant inspectors show up unannounced to the restaurant to inspect its hygiene, then give a ranking of A, B, or C depending on how many code violations the restaurant has. An "A" grade is considered the best grade (with 0 to 13 violations), with the highest standard for cleanliness; a "B" grade indicates 14 to 27 violations; and a "C" grade, the worst grade, indicates at least 28 violations. Restaurants then receive placards containing the restaurant's grades and post them in a prominent location. Each placard is embossed and tagged with a number as an anti-counterfeiting measure. Restaurateurs who get a "B" or "C" could request a re-review of their restaurants, getting "Grade Pending" placards in the meantime. As part of the launch, the New York City Department of Health and Mental Hygiene hired 23 inspectors, bringing the total number of inspectors to 180. It also raised the number of annual visits from 60,000 to 85,000.

Michael Bloomberg, the then-mayor of New York City, stated that the practice was meant to reduce the number of foodborne illnesses and improve food safety. However, some restaurants avoid being regulated by registering as supermarkets or warehouses. Within 18 months of the grading system's implementation, salmonella infections dropped by 14%, but the total amount of the fines issued rose more than 145%, prompting large criticism. In 2014, the grading system was restructured to reduce fines. In 2016, ninety-three percent of restaurants got an "A" grade, the highest percentage in the history of the grading system.

== International model ==
Because of the way in which urban and rural New Yorkers have cooperated to create a protected ecosystem that brings healthy local food and clean water to a large urban population, New York City has become an international food systems model. The United Nations invited New York farmers, workers, retailers, and NGOs to act as representatives to the UN's Commission on Sustainable Development at its headquarters in New York City. The city hosted the UN's City and Farm Linkages Showcase in May 2008 to show New York State's urban–rural partnership to international leaders.
