= Trees of New York City =

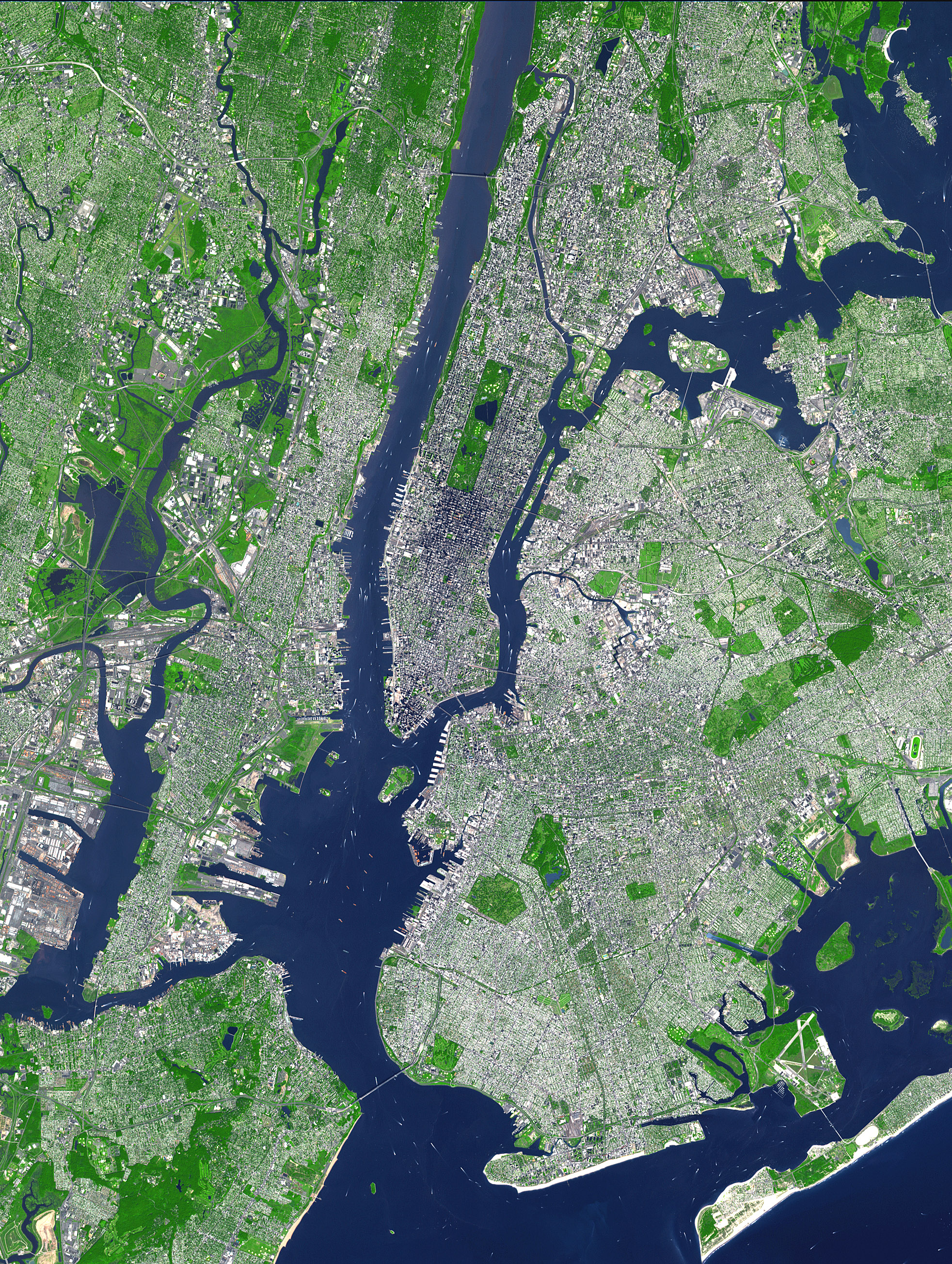
The urban forest of New York City highlighted in a satellite image from 2002 taken by NASA's Terra satellite. The near-infrared bands enhance areas of vegetation in false color.

The land comprising New York City holds approximately 5.2 million trees and 168 different tree species, as of 2020. The New York City government, alongside an assortment of environmental organizations, actively work to plant and maintain the trees. As of 2020, New York City held 44,509 acres of urban tree canopy with 24% of its land covered in trees.

== History of trees in New York City ==
Trees have grown continuously on the mainland and islands that now comprise New York City since the end of the Pleistocene epoch. Trees have inhabited the lands in or around what is now New York City for over 300 million years, far before the existence of humanity. The first human settlement in the NYC area is dated as early as 9,000 years ago, this marked the beginning of human's permanently altering the old-growth forest ecosystem.

Humanity's impact of the trees in New York City greatly accelerated with European colonization of the Americas as the new settlers brought with them advanced metal tools and tree processing technologies paired with an appetite for lumber for domestic use and for export to others of the Thirteen Colonies and to the Old World. While the Native American population lived off and with the Northeastern coastal forests relatively symbiotically, the new European colonists, with their higher population density, sedentary housing needs, and agriculture techniques, diminished the need to harvest wild fruits from trees. The New World found itself rapidly deforested, New York City included.

=== Native American use of trees ===
The Lenape peoples who inhabited the greater NYC area directly prior to European colonization relied on trees for food, shelter, tool materials, fuel, and medicine. The typical Lenape house, called a longhouse, relied on the bending of the trunks taken from small trees to create a series of arches to serve as the frame. The Lenape used prickly-ash (Zanthoxylum americanum) as medicine for toothaches because chewing on the leaves or bark creates a tingling, or numbing effect in the mouth.

In 1624, at the time of the founding of New Amsterdam, huge stands of oak, hickory, and chestnut trees grew throughout the island of Manhattan. The very name "Manhattan" is recorded as originally referring to a stand of hickory trees with wood suitable for bow-making, located at the southern tip of the island. At this time, the area now known as Times Square was a Red Maple swamp. The Lenape called Governors Island: “Pagganck,” which means “nut island,” named after the areas abundance of hickory nut trees.

Native Americans made use of fire in ecosystems here as elsewhere, and some of the early Dutch colonists copied this practice.

The original forests and ecosystems of 1609 Manhattan have been reconstructed by the Wildlife Conservation Society's Mannahatta Project.

=== Colonial use of trees ===
Fruit trees imported during the Dutch period included apple, cherry, peach and pear planted in prominent orchards.

At the corner of Cherry Street and Franklin Square, was the "Cherry Garden" planted by David Provost Sr., and later operated by the brewer Richard Sackett as "Sackett's Orchard" with a beer garden and bowling green. George Washington later lived at 1 Cherry Street, the location being notable as the nation's first presidential residence. Remnants of the orchard survived into the 1870s, when the last of the trees and Washington's home at 1 Cherry Street, were razed to build the Brooklyn Bridge.

Lumber in Manhattan during the Dutch period was largely processed at the Sawkill saw mill, worked by a settlement of enslaved Africans.

=== Contemporary use of trees ===
In New York City, the harvesting of trees for lumber and the maintaining of orchards for fruit declined as forests and farmland was bought and developed to house the growing population of the city. Parsons Nurseries, a late effort at commercial tree cultivation for ornamental imports, was active in Queens in the late 19th century. Since the late 19th-early 20th century, the functions of the trees planted in the urban landscape and parks of New York City is to provide shade, help manage rainwater runoff, and clean the air by absorbing some of the carbon dioxide produced by New York City's 18+ million residents.

In an effort to maintain and improve its urban forest, New York City runs tree planting efforts through the Parks Department. As of 2020, New York City Department of Parks and Recreation is the steward of most of the 2.5+ million trees growing within New York City. The New York City Tree Map is an interactive map by the parks department that catalogues more than 850,000 trees in the city.

The NYC Department of Parks observes Earth Day and Arbor Day.

Street trees as a metaphor for urban life were popularized in the 1943 novel A Tree Grows in Brooklyn.

The tallest and oldest tree in New York City is a tulip poplar growing in Queens named the Queens Giant.

Between 2010 and 2017, the city's tree canopy increased by 1.7%.

== Old-growth forests ==
Tracts of trees that have been characterized as old-growth forest include the Thain Family Forest at the New York Botanical Garden (largest in the city), as well as parts of Hunter Island in Pelham Bay Park, Midwood Forest in Prospect Park, Northwest Woods in Van Cortlandt Park, Shorakapok Preserve in Inwood Hill Park, Alley Pond Park and Forest Park. A number of the old growth remnants in New York City are preserved as Forever Wild preserves.

== Notable trees ==
In 1985, a community nominations process led to the selection of sixty-five "Great Trees", and in the 21st century some of these were cloned through cuttings. In October 2024, NYC Parks released another list of 120 great trees, its first such list since 1985.

=== Notable living trees ===
Living trees
Name	Type	Location	Borough	Notes
Queens Giant	Tulip poplar	Alley Pond Park	Queens	A 134+ foot tall tulip poplar tree, believed to be the tallest and oldest tree in the city
Clove Lakes Colossus	Tulip poplar	Clove Lakes Park	Staten Island	A 119+ foot tall tulip poplar tree with 21+ foot circumference
Hangman's Elm	English elm	Washington Square Park	Manhattan	Planted in the 1790s. Believed to be the oldest tree in Manhattan. It was rumored to be where traitors were hanged during the American Revolution, but this was determined to be unfounded. The only recorded execution in this area was of Rose Butler, in 1820, who was hanged from a gallows in the city's potter's field about 500 feet from the elm.
Magnolia grandiflora at 677 Lafayette Avenue	Magnolia grandiflora	Bedford–Stuyvesant	Brooklyn	A rare example of a flourishing laurel magnolia growing far north in New York, brought as a seedling from North Carolina and planted around 1885 by William Lemken. A New York City designated landmark
Survivor Tree	Callery pear	National September 11 Memorial	Manhattan	A callery pear tree that survived the September 11, 2001 terror attacks at the World Trade Center. Taken off-site and nursed back to health by the NYC Parks department, the Survivor Tree was returned and replanted at the memorial site in 2010.
Camperdown Elm (Marianne Moore)	Camperdown elm	Prospect Park	Brooklyn	Planted in Prospect Park in 1872, a descendant of a unique elm species from the Earl of Camperdown's Scottish estate. Among the first planted in the United States.
James Madison Tree	Red oak	Madison Square Park	Manhattan	A red oak grown on James Madison's estate in Virginia and transplanted in 1936 at Madison Square Park to celebrate the 100th anniversary of Madison Avenue.
The Dinosaur	English elm	Washington Heights	Manhattan	English elm tree, planted on the estate of the Morris Jumel Mansion in the early 18th century. George Washington allegedly stood under the tree on September 21, 1776, to watch the fire set by American rebels that burnt much of New York City.
Boss Tweed Ginkgo	Ginkgo	Crocheron Park	Queens	A 150+ year old ginkgo tree, alleged witness to Boss Tweed’s escape from the United States.
Hare Krishna Tree	American elm	Tompkins Square Park	Manhattan	An American elm where the "Hare Krishna" mantra was chanted publicly in 1966 for the first time outside of India, marking the birth of the Hare Krishna movement in the West.
Woodside Beech Tree	Beech	Woodside	Queens	A large beech tree estimated to be between 150 and 200 years old.

=== Notable deceased trees ===
Deceased trees
Name	Type	Location	Borough	Notes
Weeping Beech	Weeping beech	Flushing	Queens	The original weeping beech tree located in Flushing was the mother of all European weeping beeches in the United States. After the original died in 1998, the location was replanted with new weeping beech trees. Even though the original is no longer living, the tree remains a New York City designated landmark.
Gran Bwa	Unidentified large stump	Prospect Park	Brooklyn	A large tree stump formerly located by the lake in Prospect Park. The stump was carved into a sculpture and named after Gran Bwa, the Haitian Vodou spirit associated with trees. The Gran Bwa sculpture depicted a big human head, two small human faces, a lion and a legba. The stump was sculpted in the 1980s by a Haitian immigrant Deenps Bazile. Communities and individuals recreating and worshipping in Prospect Park appreciated the tree stump sculpture until its removal. The Haitian community gathered and still gathers at the Gran Bwa location to celebrate Bwa Kayiman.
Tree of Hope	Elm	Lafayette Theatre, Harlem	Manhattan	Once considered the most famous tree in Harlem, the Tree of Hope was an elm tree growing outside the Lafayette Theatre in Harlem in 132nd Street, that musicians would touch for good luck. In 1933, part of the stump of the Tree of Hope was removed and gifted to the Apollo Theater, where it sat next to the stage until ultimately moved to the lobby following a renovation. According to a report in the New York Herald Tribune, the tree got its name from a group of actors recently fired from a show that had gone bankrupt. Owed back pay, the group gathered at the tree of hope, hoping to see the manager and recoup their wages. Eventually the actors received $6.43 in back pay. Inspired by the success of the actors, the tree became a meeting spot for actors in search of work. The actors and performers who rubbed the Tree of Hope for good luck included: Bojangles Robinson, Aubrey Lyles, Flournoy Miller, and many others. In 1941, Bojangles Robinson worked with mayor Fiorello La Guardia to plant a replacement tree in the old location of the Tree of Hope.
Inwood Tulip Tree at Shorakapkok	Tulip poplar	Inwood Hill Park	Manhattan	A large tulip tree that grew to the height of 165 feet and a girth of 20 feet. The tree died 1932, at the estimated age of 220 years old. Some saw the tree as a last remaining link to the Wecquaesgeek who lived amongst the tree at Shorakapok. A small monument now stands where the tree once grew.
Stuyvesant Pear Tree	Pear tree	Stuyvesant Farm, East Village	Manhattan	In 1647, Peter Stuyvesant, the Dutch colonial governor, planted a pear tree on his farm, Stuyvesant Farm. It stood here for two hundred years, with New York City growing around it. The 1811 street grid covered over the farm but spared the Stuyvesant Pear Tree. The tree remained there until February 1867, weakened by a massive winter storm and done in by a wagon collision. A plaque marking the Stuyvesant tree's spot remains at the corner of 13th Street and Third Avenue. In this neighborhood, pear trees are still planted to commemorate the original pear tree planted by Stuyvesant. A Stuyvesant descendant gifted a cross-section of the original trunk to the New-York Historical Society.
Dongan Oak	White oak	Battle Pass, Prospect Park	Brooklyn	The Dongan Oak was a boundary tree felled and used as a barricade by the American defenders against the northward invasion during the American Revolutionary War. The stump of the Dongan Oak was still recorded in the 1840s, and it may have been destroyed in the landscaping that created Prospect Park, when parts of the hills were also leveled. The tree is believed to have been 100+ years old at the time the Colonial soldiers cut it down.
Wall Street Buttonwood Tree	Buttonwood	Financial District	Manhattan	The Buttonwood Agreement, which established what is now the New York Stock Exchange, was signed in 1792 under this tree.
Thirteen Union Trees	Sweetgum trees	Hamilton Grange, St. Nicholas Park	Manhattan	Thirteen sweet gum trees planted ~ 1802 by Alexander Hamilton, growing near the entrance of his Hamilton's home, the Grange. The thirteen trees symbolized the original thirteen states of the Union. The trees were cut down in December, 1908.
Woodside Chestnut Tree	American chestnut	Woodside	Queens	An ancient chestnut tree that grew in what would become Woodside, Queens. The large tree served as a legal meeting place and town square for the town of Newtown and later Woodside. The large tree is said to have been 8 to 10 feet in diameter.
Treaty Tree	Oak	Bartow-Pell Mansion, Pelham Bay Park	The Bronx	An oak tree reported to be the location of a treaty signing in 1654 between Thomas Pell, an English settler, and Chief Wampage of the Siwanoy Indians declaring peace and granting large swathes of land to Pell. The truthfulness of this legend is in question with some scholars questioning the origin and motivation of the Treaty Tree and other treaty trees believing them to be propaganda promoting the narrative of peaceful colonial settlement. The name of Treaty Tree was giving to this historic tree later in its life and only after Native American archaeological artifacts were found nearby, further fueling speculation that the history surrounding the Treaty Tree name is inaccurate. The historic tree died and was replaced in 1915. The replacement was replaced in 2015.
Fox Oaks	Oak	John Bowne House, Flushing	Queens	A grove of oak trees that stood in Flushing, Queens. During a Quaker meeting in 1672 featuring the newly arrived George Fox, the founder of the Religious Society of Friends in England, Fox's popularity drew such a large crowd, that they could not fit into the John Bowne House. The group moved the meeting outside, holding the meeting under the grove of oaks. The trees lived until the mid-to-late 19th century. A rock monument now stands where the trees once lived.
Flushing Cedar of Lebanon	Cedar of Lebanon	Flushing	Queens	Once the pride of Flushing, the 200+ year-old Lebanese cedar tree was killed by lightning in 1934. A Lebanese cedar tree grows at Weeping Beech Park, Flushing, Queens. The likely relative of the Flushing Cedar of Lebanon was grown at the 19th-century nursery of Samuel Parsons.
Twelve Apostles	Beech trees	Bay Ridge	Brooklyn	A grove of 12 old-growth beech trees estimated to be over 200 years old in 1912. When 75th street was expanded to the shore, the new road ran through the grove. The grove stood until the Jacobus family sold the land. In the early 20th century, an apartment building was built on the site and the trees were destroyed.

== Trees growing in New York City ==
For a full list including street trees of New York City, as well as trees planted in New York City parks and public spaces, see this article: list of tree species of New York City.

=== 10 most common street trees in New York City ===
Scientific name	Common name	Photo	Size	Native species	% of NYC street trees (data from 2006)
Platanus × hispanica	London plane		Large	Non-native	15.3%
Acer platanoides	Norway maple		Large	Non-native, invasive	14.1%
Pyrus calleryana	Callery pear		Medium	Non-native, highly invasive	10.9%
Gleditsia triacanthos inermis	Thornless honey locust		Large	Non-native	8.9%
Quercus palustris	Pin oak		Medium	Native	7.5%
Tilia cordata	Littleleaf linden		Large	Non-native	4.7%
Fraxinus pennsylvanica	Green ash		Medium	Native	3.5%
Acer rubrum	Red maple		Large	Native	3.5%
Acer saccharinum	Silver maple		Large	Native	3.2%
Ginkgo biloba	Ginkgo		Large	Non-native	2.8%

== Arboreta in New York City ==
Arboretum	Address	Borough	Latitude & Longitude	Accredited Arboretum Status
Arthur and Janet Ross Conifer Arboretum	200th Street & Kazimiroff Blvd., Bronx, New York, 10458, United States	Bronx	40.8719°N 73.8878°W	
Brooklyn Botanic Garden	1000 Washington Avenue, Brooklyn, New York, 11238, United States	Brooklyn	40.6676°N 73.9618°W	III
Fordham University	441 E. Fordham Road, Bronx, New York, 10465, United States	Bronx	40.8613°N 73.8897°W	
Green-Wood	500 25th Street, Brooklyn, New York, 11232, United States	Brooklyn	40.6581°N 73.9947°W	III
Madison Square Park Conservancy	11 Madison Avenue 15th Floor, New York, New York, 10010, United States	Manhattan	40.7416°N 73.9874°W	II
New York Botanical Garden	2900 Southern Blvd., Bronx, New York, 10458, United States	Bronx	40.8719°N 73.8878°W	
The Evergreens Arboretum	1629 Bushwick Avenue, Brooklyn, New York, 11207, United States	Brooklyn	40.6841°N 73.9034°W	II
The Woodlawn Cemetery	4199 Webster Avenue, Bronx, New York 10470, United States,	Bronx	40.8878°N 73.8675°W	II

== See also ==
- List of tree species of New York City
