= Tonkonogy =

Tonkonogy is a surname of Russian origin (Тонконогий) meaning "thin-legged". The female version of the surname is Tonkonogaya (Тонконогая).

Notable people with the surname include:

- George T. Delacorte Jr. (1894–1991), American magazine publisher born George Tonkonogy Jr.
- Gertrude Tonkonogy Friedberg (1908–1989), American playwright
- Eugene Tonkonogy (1905–2001), American entrepreneur and owner of Marina Cay
