= U Thant Island =

Islet on the East River in New York City

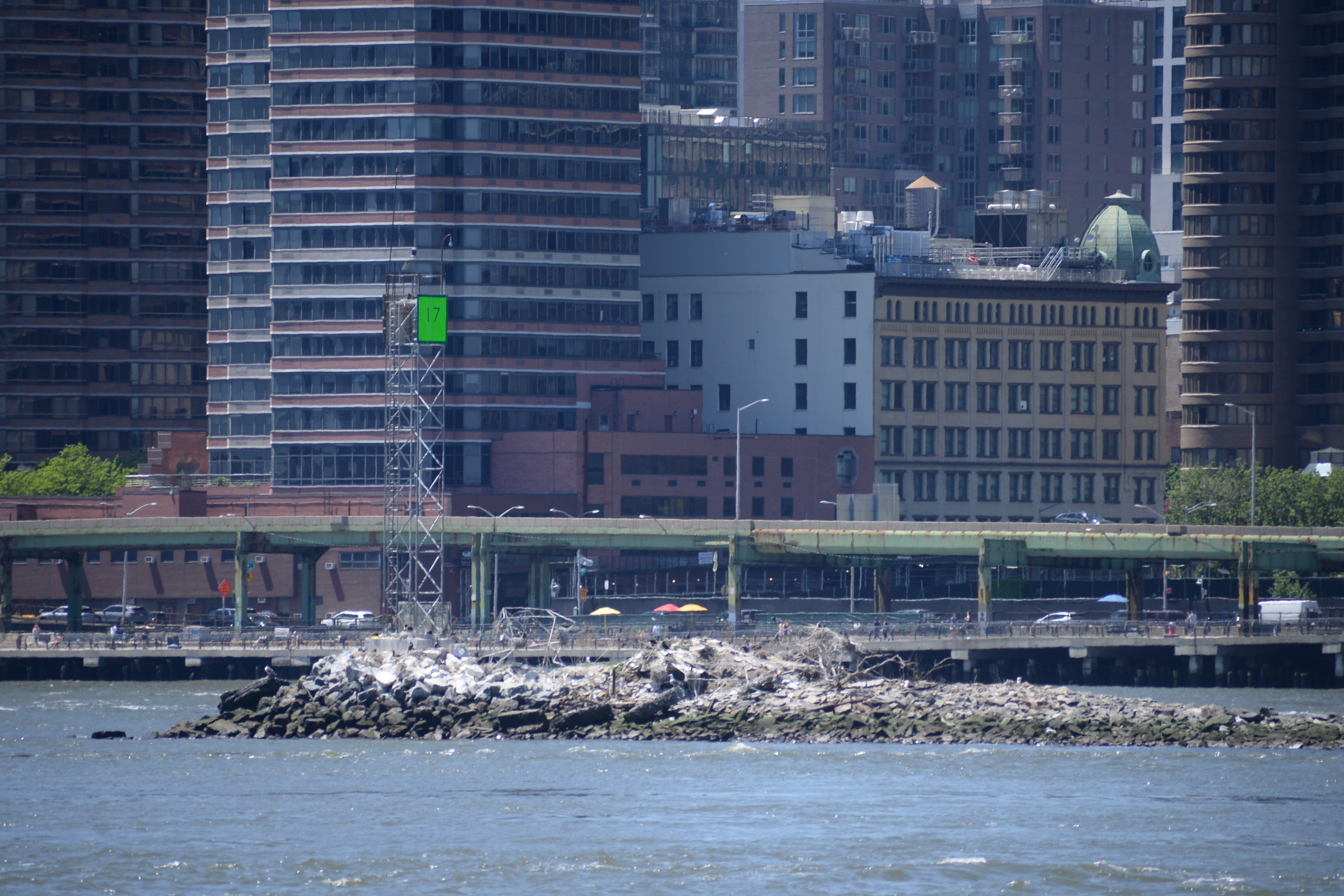
- U Thant Island viewed from Queens

Geography
- Location: East River
- Coordinates: 40°44′48″N 73°57′52″W
- Length: 200 ft (60 m)
- Width: 100 ft (30 m)

Administration
- United States
- State: New York
- Borough: Manhattan

U Thant Island (officially Belmont Island) is a small artificial island or islet in New York City's East River, within the borough of Manhattan. The 100-by-200-foot (30 by 60 m) island, created during the construction of the Steinway Tunnel directly underneath, is the smallest island in Manhattan. The island was originally named after August Belmont Jr., who financed the construction of the subway tunnel, and in 1977 was rededicated in memory of U Thant, the former Secretary-General of the United Nations. The islet contains a lighted beacon marking the southern end of Roosevelt Island Reef and is the home to a small colony of double-crested cormorants.

== Location and jurisdiction ==
The tiny artificial island is 100 by 200 feet (30 by 60 m) in size and located in the East River, just south of Roosevelt Island. It lies midway between the United Nations Headquarters at 42nd Street, in Manhattan to the west, and Gantry Plaza State Park in Long Island City, within Queens to the east. It is legally part of Manhattan and is formally a part of Manhattan Community District 6, which also includes the neighborhoods of Turtle Bay and Murray Hill to the west of U Thant Island. The Borough, Block and Lot is Manhattan, Block 1373 (shared with Roosevelt Island), and Lot 200.

The island is owned by the New York State Government and is currently protected as a sanctuary for migrating birds. Public access is prohibited. Since 2016, the island has been designated a Recognized Ecological Complex under the city's Waterfront Revitalization Program.

The United States Coast Guard maintains a 57-foot (17 m) tall lighted beacon on the island, designated "Roosevelt Island Reef Light 17"; an earlier 23-foot (7 m) tall light had been erected in 1938, and another pair before then. Belmont Island is located near the southwest end of Roosevelt Island Reef, which extends 0.3 nautical miles (0.3 mi; 0.6 km) southwestward from Roosevelt Island.

Elevations on Roosevelt Island are sometimes measured in reference to the "Belmont Island Datum", which is 2.265 feet (0.69 m) below the mean sea level at Sandy Hook.

== History ==
=== 1890s to 1910s ===
In the 1890s, businessman William Steinway began a project to construct a tunnel for trolleys under the East River to link Manhattan to his company town, Steinway Village, in Astoria, Queens; the tunnel would be named the Steinway Tunnel after him. Work on the project was halted in 1892 after a dynamite blast near a shaft in Long Island City killed five workers. Steinway died before his tunnels' completion, and financier August Belmont Jr. saw the project to completion between 1905 and 1907. The tunnels, which pass directly beneath the island, are now part of the New York City Subway system and used by the IRT Flushing Line (7 and <7> trains). A shaft dug into the rock outcrop known as Man-o'-War Reef during construction of the tunnel produced excess landfill that built up the reef and created a small island. Belmont Island, named after the financier, became the legal name of the island.

From 1899 to 1903, the portion of the rock ledge that extended southwestward from Blackwell's Island known as Man-o'-War Rock had been blasted to a depth of 26 feet (7.9 m) for the federal government; the southern end of this reef was located across from East 37th Street in Manhattan. Two other groups of rocks were located between Man-o'-War Rock and Blackwell's Island. According to William Barclay Parsons, who worked on the Steinway Tunnel as a consulting engineer, and Colonel H. Taylor of the Corps of Engineers, the location of the shaft was incorrectly referred to as "Man-of-War-Reef" and the rock outcrop was instead located near the southern end of "Blackwell's Island Reef." Parsons noted that the site of the shaft was commonly called Man-of-War Reef even though that reef had been removed by the federal government. The rock outcrop the shaft was located on, along with Blackwell's Island, were both composed of Fordham gneiss.

Permission to construct two shafts on Man-o'-War Reef and create a temporary island to support the staging of equipment was obtained from Robert Shaw Oliver of the War Department on June 28, 1905. The permit was effective for a two-year period beginning on July 1, 1905 and allowed a temporary island up to 100 feet (30 m) wide by 400 feet (120 m) long to be created. At the conclusion of the work, the equipment was to be removed and the rock outcrop was to be returned to its original condition. A similar permit was obtained from the Commissioners of the Land Office of New York State on July 8, 1905. Permission to sink a shaft in the East River had originally been requested from the Corporation Counsel, which referred the matter to the Commissioner of Docks and Ferries, but no records of grants of land under water from the state to the city were found in the vicinity of the proposed shaft site, which prompted the Corporation Counsel to advise the Attorney General of New York of the matter. Authorization was also received from the Lighthouse Service to temporarily move the Blackwells Island Reef light located on Man-o'-War Rock to the top of a building that was constructed on the island.

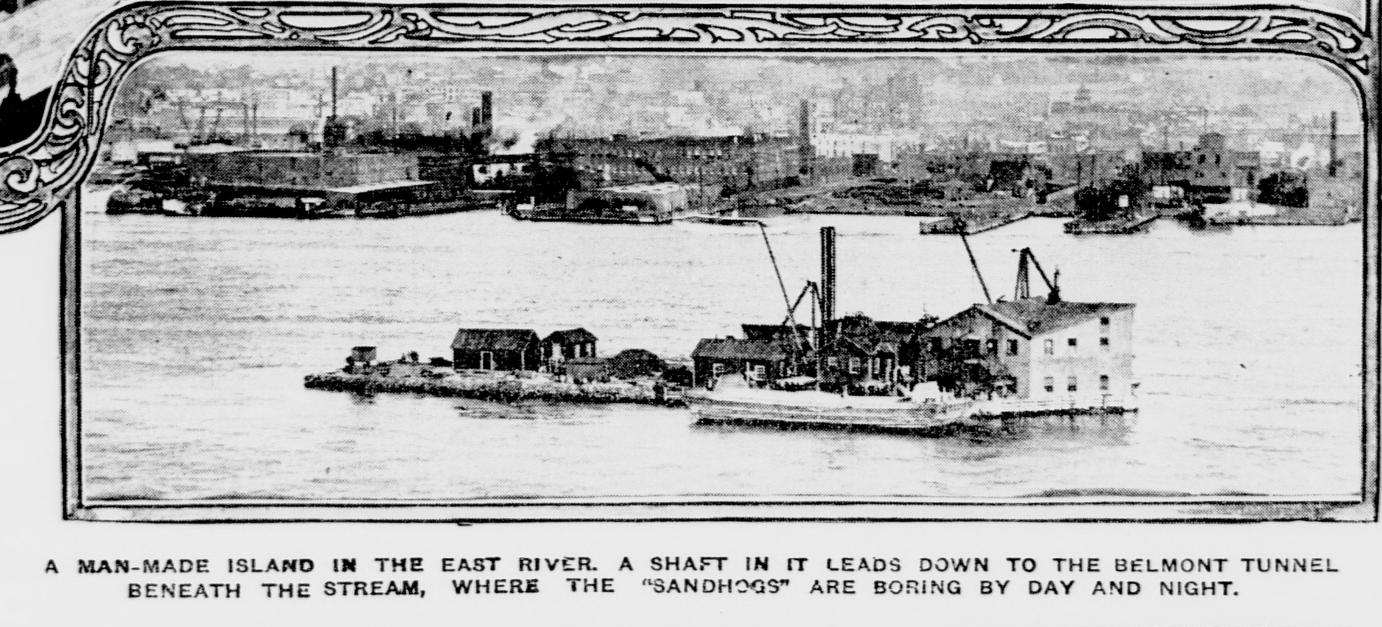
Newly-built island in 1906 during tunnel construction

Preparations for construction on Man-o'-War Reef began at the end of July 1905 and the shaft was sunk the following month. In addition to containing the two shafts with an air lock above them, the 100-by-350-foot (30 by 107 m) island included buildings containing an air receiver, pumps, electric motors, and a steam engine. Construction of the shafts in the middle of the river allowed workers to tunnel from them in both directions, adding more workfaces and helping to speed up construction. Four workers were killed on January 16, 1906 during an accident that occurred in the shaft under the island.

After the tunnel was completed in 1907, there were talks about retaining the island for the erection of a lighthouse as an aid to navigation. In 1909, Commissioner of Public Charities Robert W. Hebberd proposed connecting the southern tip of Blackwell's Island to Man o' War Reef using landfill to create an additional 16 acres (6.5 ha) of park space designed by architect Raymond F. Almirall. The proposal would have eliminated the need to use a boat to access Belmont Island.

The tracks in the tunnel were not placed into permanent operation until 1915. The tunnel was purchased by the city, which reconstructed it beginning in 1914 to accommodate subway cars; this work also included filling in the shaft on Man o' War Reef. However, no actions were taken to remove the temporary island, demolish the buildings that had been erected on it, or restore the Blackwells Island Reef light to its original condition. By 1916, the structure that the light had been placed on top of had fallen into disrepair and the War Department sent an inquiry to the Public Service Commission asking who was responsible for the building and if there was any reason why it should not be demolished so the light could be replaced. The structures on the island were demolished by a contractor in 1918.

=== 1920s to 1960s ===
On July 7, 1926, the submarine S-51 ran aground at Man-o'-War Reef while it was being towed down the East River to the Brooklyn Navy Yard. The vessel was pulled off the reef eleven hours later by tugboats with the help of the tide. The submarine had been raised from the bottom of the ocean earlier in the week after it had sunk off Block Island and was being taken to the Brooklyn Navy Yard for salvaging.

In the late 1930s, the U.S. Waterways Experiment Station conducted a study of tidal currents in the East River to improve alignments through Hell Gate and flow conditions in the vicinity of Belmont Island, the latter of which involved a tendency of northwesterly river currents during the flood tide to direct ship traffic towards the Manhattan shore. Twenty different improvement plans were tested, some of which included the complete removal of Belmont Island. The study recommended widening the channel to the south of Belmont Island and removing part of a rock ledge located north of the island. Improvements to the East River were recommended to the United States Congress the following year as part of a $39 million improvement program between the Brooklyn Navy Yard and Throgs Neck.

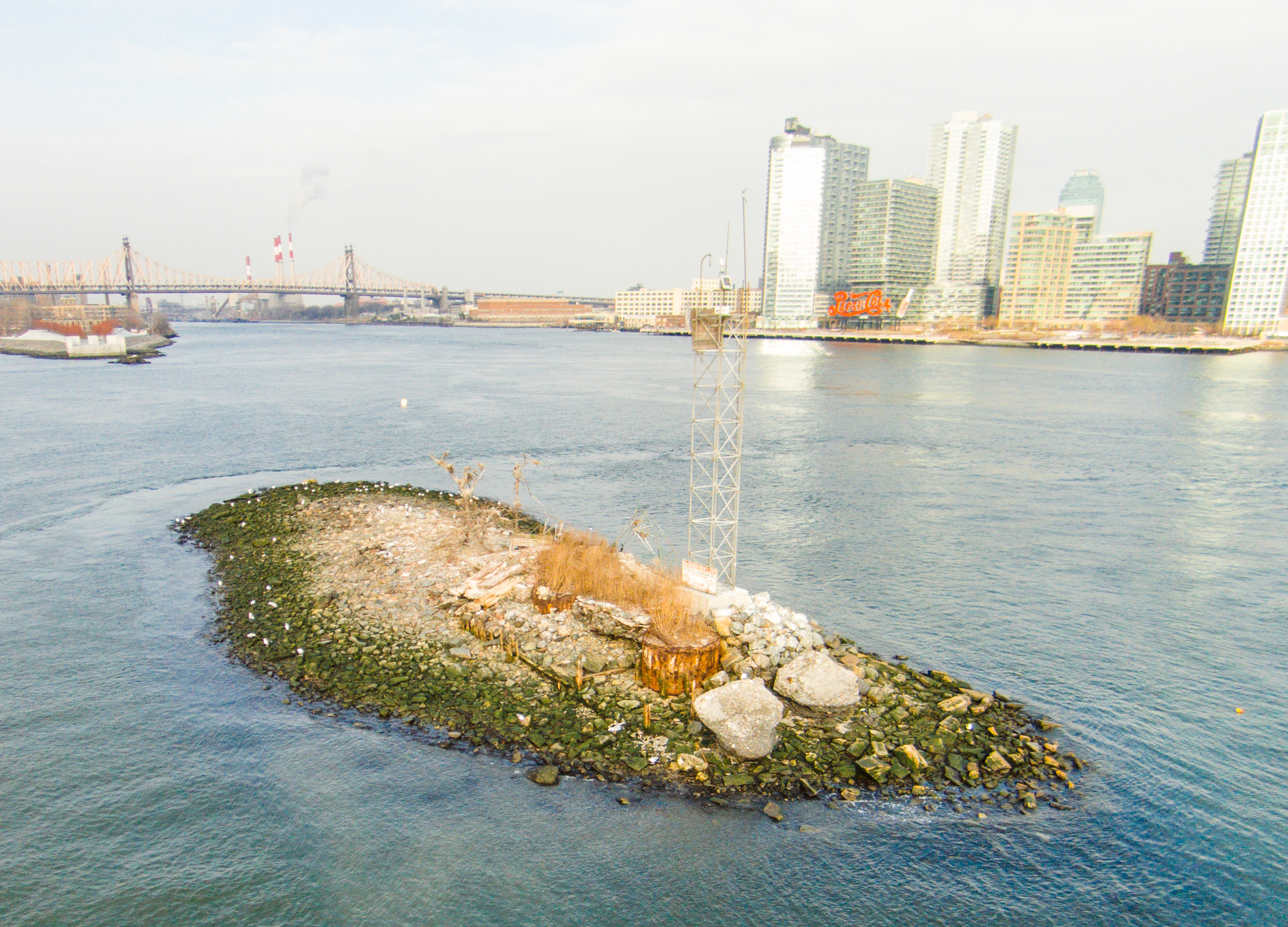
View of the islet from the south, with the southern tip of Roosevelt Island in the distance

In the 1950s, Buckminster Fuller proposed installing a 200-foot-diameter (61 m) Geoscope with its bottom suspended 200 feet (61 m) above the water, supported by cables hung from towers erected on the outcropping of rocks in the middle of the East River one-quarter mile (400 m) south of Welfare Island (which was renamed Roosevelt Island in the 1970s). He later presented his idea to a group of United Nations ambassadors during a luncheon held at the Hotel Pierre, but no funds were available to construct the project, which was then estimated to cost $10 million.

On the evening of February 7, 1964, the 33,310-short-ton (30,218 t) Norwegian tanker Sigdal ran aground on Belmont Island. The vessel was traveling up the East River carrying fuel oil from Aruba to the Bronx. Such a ship normally would have been accompanied by one or two tugboats but it arrived in New York Harbor during a tugboat strike and was operating on its own. Fuel was offloaded from the tanker into lighter barges so the vessel could be pulled off the rock ledge; it took three days before the ship was freed by a salvage vessel from Merritt-Chapman & Scott and two tugboats.

In 1968, the Hudson Institute published a proposal for connecting Welfare Island and Belmont Island by landfill to form a single larger island, as part of an economic redevelopment. 42nd Street would have extended across the island from Manhattan to Queens, connected by a Ponte Vecchio-like bridge covered in shops. "Belmont Center", modeled on Rockefeller Center, would have had towers of up to 80 stories.

The Delacorte Fountain, a Jet d'Eau–like fountain sponsored by George T. Delacorte Jr. stood nearby at the southern tip of Roosevelt Island, and faced calls for its relocation to Belmont Island from the time it was dedicated in 1969 until it stopped operating in 1986 and was subsequently abandoned.

=== 1970s to present ===
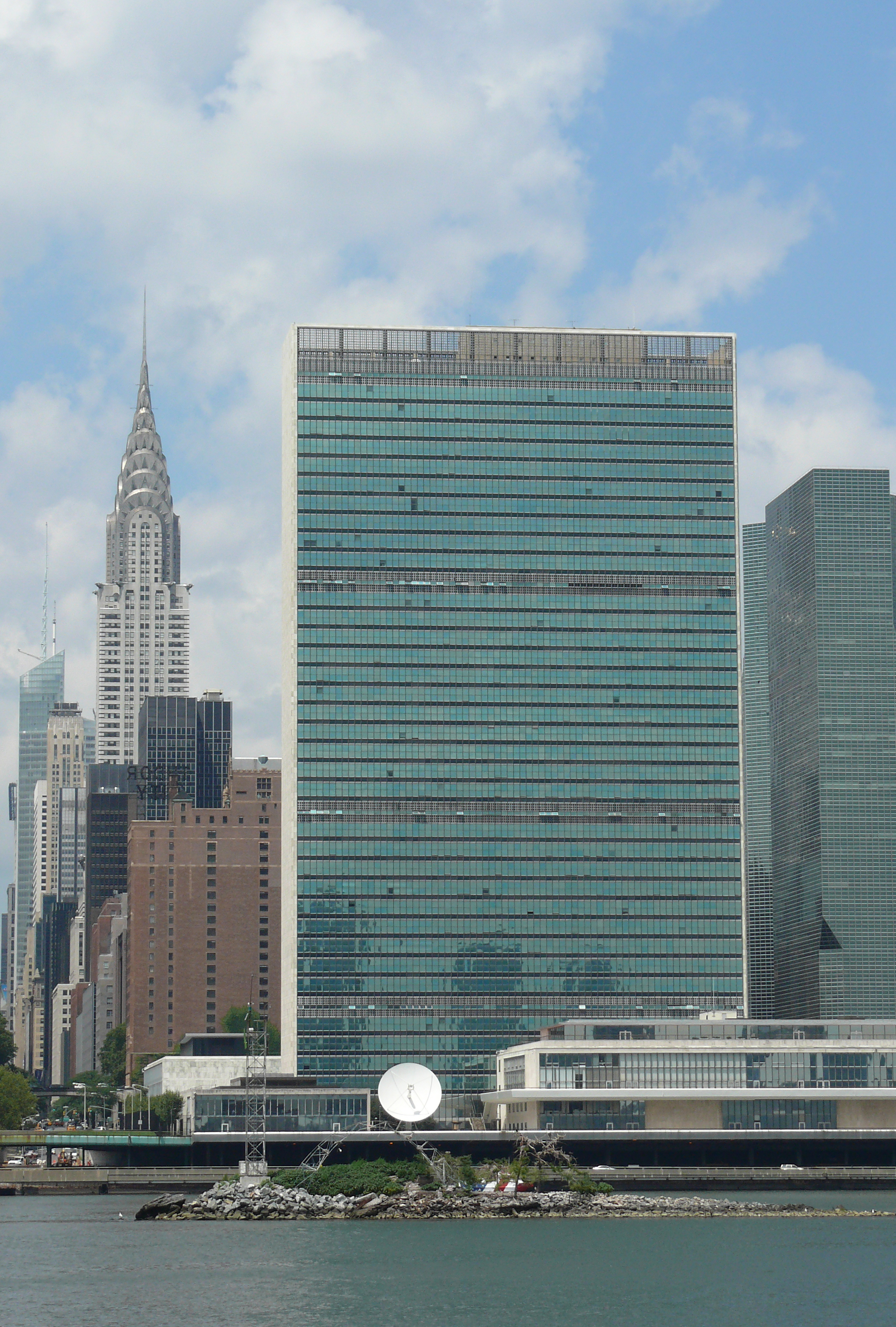
The Chrysler Building and United Nations Secretariat Building, with U Thant Island in the foreground

On August 25, 1972, the island was declared "Soviet Jewry Freedom Island" and symbolically occupied for 2 1/2 hours by six activists led by Manhattan and Bronx Borough Presidents Percy Sutton and Robert Abrams to protest a United Nations speech by Leonid Brezhnev and the imposition of the diploma tax as a barrier to emigration from the Soviet Union. Other members of the group that landed on the island included Rabbi Gilbert Klaperman, chairman of the Greater New York Conference on Soviet Jewry, and Sister Rose Thering of Seton Hall University. The group rented a tugboat for reporters and camera crews to cover the event and carried a 20 by 6 foot (6.1 m × 1.8 m) banner displaying the new name of the island. The event caught the attention of the Soviet delegation at the United Nations, which complained to Secretary-General Kurt Waldheim. The New York City Police Department dispatched a boat to the island, but let the group stay when they found out they had obtained a temporary deed to the island from state officials. Publicity for the event had been organized by Howard Rubenstein.

After the death of U Thant, the former Secretary-General of the United Nations, the island was adopted by a group called the Peace Meditation at the United Nations, employees at the United Nations headquarters and followers of the guru Sri Chinmoy, who served as the interfaith chaplain there. They leased the island from New York State, greened its surface, and unofficially renamed it after Thant, who was a friend of Chinmoy. The island was dedicated to the memory of Thant on September 16, 1977 in a ceremony attended by Daw Aye Aye Thant, the daughter of Thant.

On October 7, 1982, Belmont Island was formally named U Thant Island and the island, along with a 30-foot-high (9.1 m) "oneness arch" made of steel tubing, with a buried vessel preserving personal items of the island's namesake, was dedicated by Chinmoy with officials from New York State in attendance. Chinmoy's followers made visits to the island once or twice a year for maintenance, but these visits became less frequent when security around the United Nations tightened in the mid-1990s. The group later affixed a sign to the west side of the island's navigational beacon tower that includes the name of the island, a note about its dedication, a poem written by Chinmoy about Thant, a brief biography of the former Secretary-General, and text that reads: "Simplicity was U Thant's life. Sincerity was U Thant's mind. Purity was U Thant's heart. His was the approach of serene and illumined dignity."

In 1999, The New York Times Magazine staged an international competition to design a time capsule to preserve artifacts for the next millennium. An entry by Caples Jefferson Architects proposed a granite obelisk on U Thant Island that would gradually disintegrate, leaving only the time capsule by the end of the 30th century.

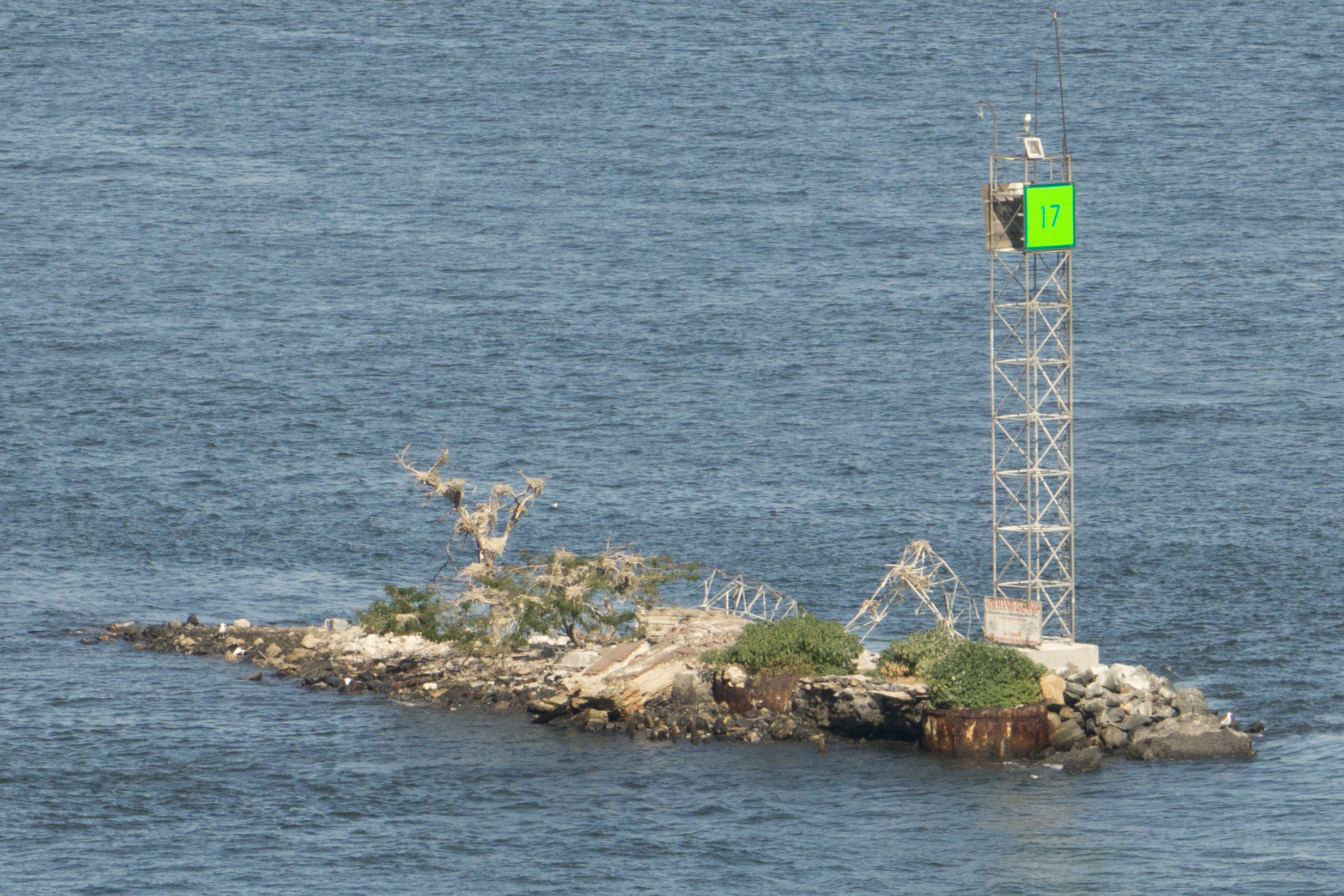
U Thant Island in 2015, showing the navigation tower, collapsed metal arch and bird nests

During the 2004 Republican National Convention, local artist and filmmaker Duke Riley, who has traveled to various abandoned islands around the New York City area, rowed a boat with a friend to the island under cover of darkness, proclaimed it a sovereign nation and hoisted a 21-foot (6.4 m)-long pennant depicting two electric eels from the island's navigation tower. On their return voyage in daylight, they were apprehended by a United States Coast Guard boat but were not arrested. The entire incident was videotaped for a piece Riley titled Belmont Island (SMEACC).

== Wildlife ==
The island has a small colony of double-crested cormorants, the population of which more than doubled from 2000 to 2011. Cormorant nests on the island have been observed on the ground, in trees and on the metal arch, the latter of which collapsed by 2011. Great black-backed gulls and herring gulls have also been spotted nesting on the island. In the most recent nesting survey conducted by NYC Bird Alliance, a total of 38 cormorant nests were counted on the island in May 2022.

The reefs in the waters surrounding the U Thant Island make it a popular spot for boats fishing for striped bass and bluefish.
