= Delacorte Fountain =

Former fountain in New York City

Coordinates: 40°45′01″N 73°57′41″W

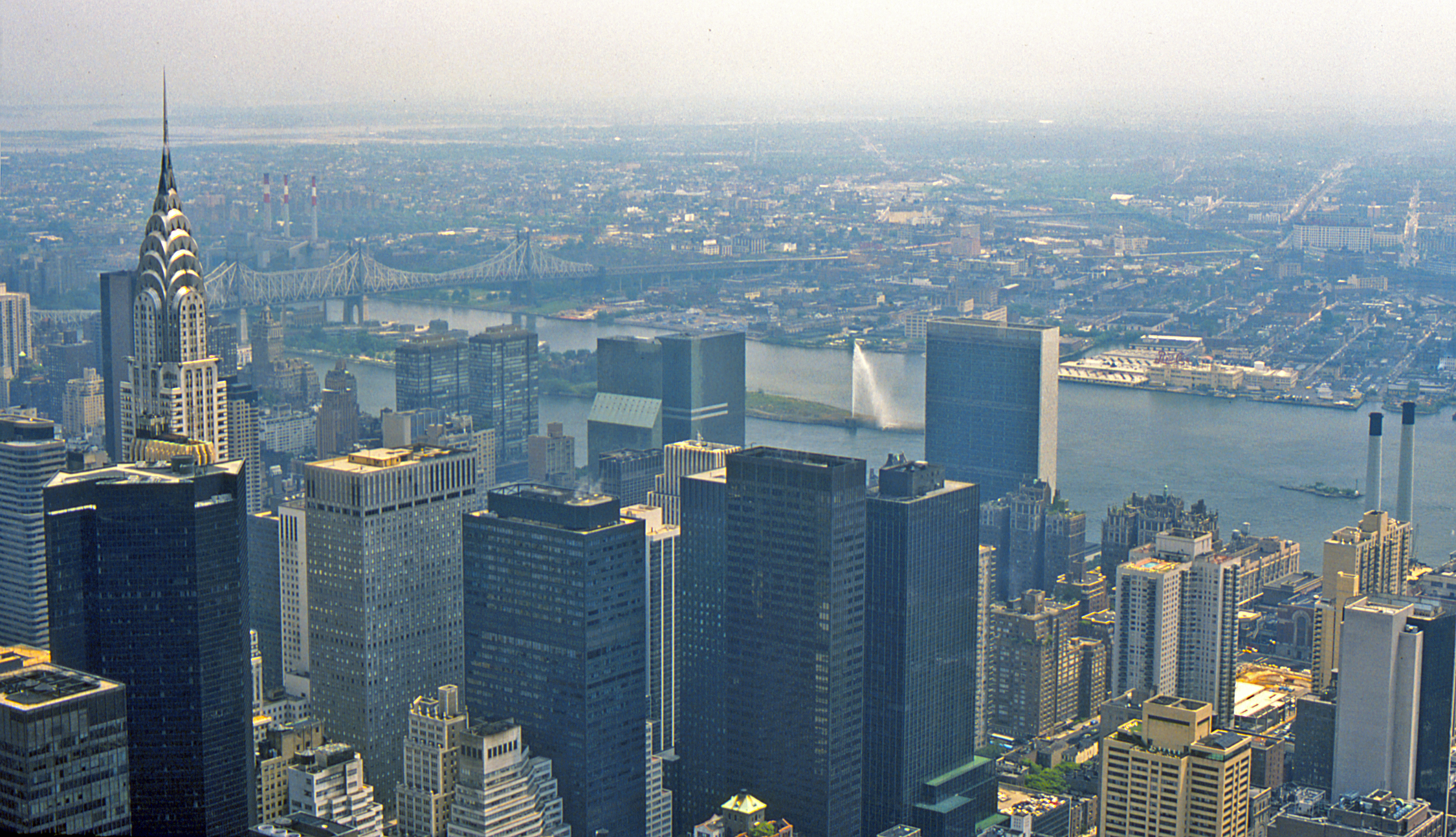
View of the Delacorte Fountain from the Empire State Building in 1984

The Delacorte Fountain, also known as the Delacorte Geyser, was a large fountain located near the southern tip of Roosevelt Island in New York City. Dedicated in 1969, the fountain operated from 1970 until 1986 when it last broke down and was abandoned. The remains of the former fountain, including the building that housed its equipment, were demolished in 1994. The former site of the fountain is now occupied by Franklin D. Roosevelt Four Freedoms Park.

== History ==
=== Construction ===
In July 1967, George T. Delacorte Jr., the founder of Dell Publishing, announced that he would be paying for the construction and maintenance of a fountain modeled after the Jet d'Eau in Geneva, Switzerland. The new fountain was to be located at the southern tip of Welfare Island in the East River, across from 49th Street in Manhattan. Delacorte's plan to construct a fountain had been previously approved by New York City Mayor John Lindsay. At the time of the announcement, Delacorte said "my wife thinks I'm crazy" and added "she thinks it will be known as Delacorte's Folly."

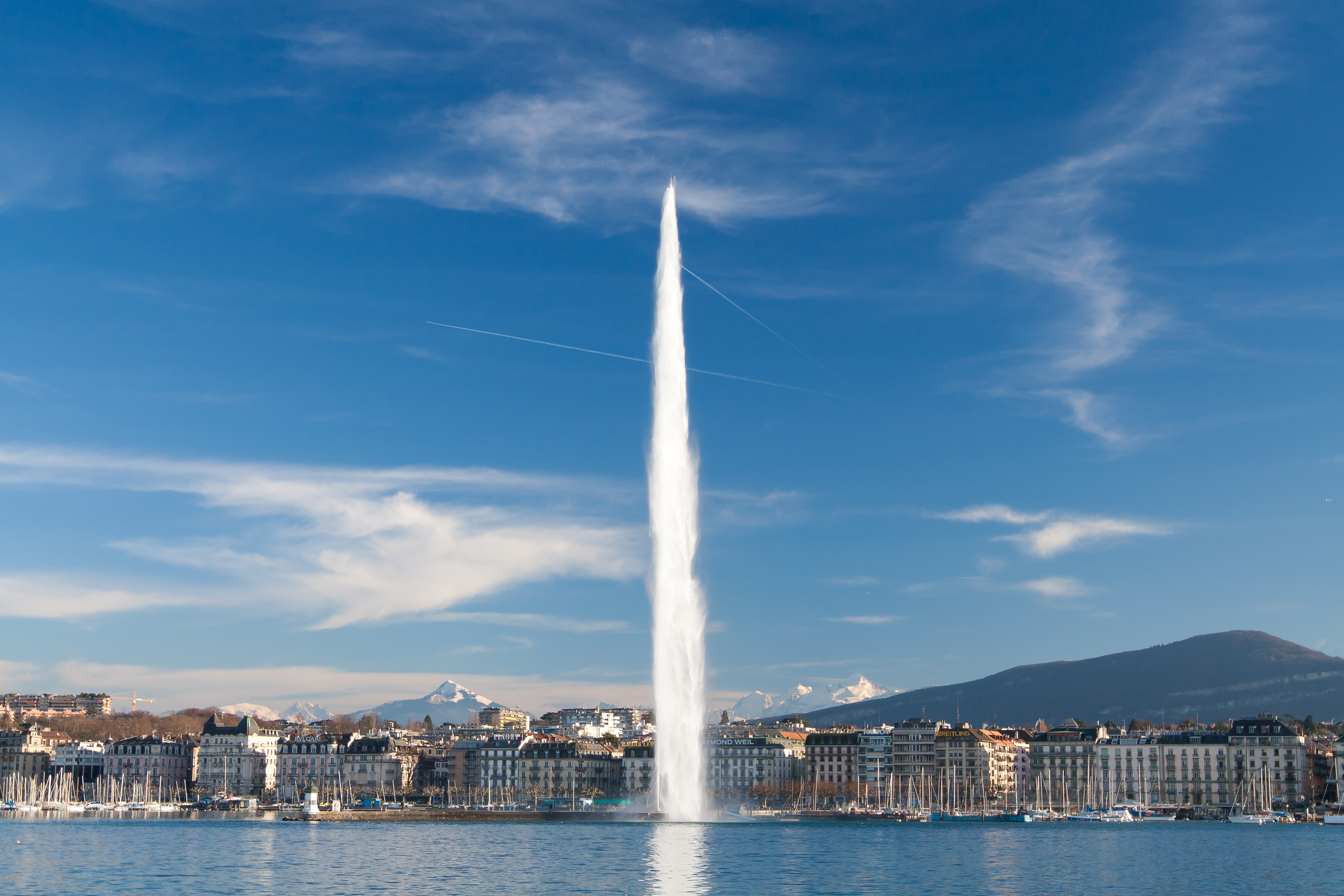
The Delacorte Fountain was modeled after the Jet d'Eau in Geneva

The fountain was designed by the architecture firm of Pomerance & Breines. When the architects reached out to the city of Geneva for technical advice in designing the water pumps for the new fountain, they were told that the design of the Jet d'Eau was a secret. The firm then turned to the Worthington Pump Company in Newark, New Jersey, to design a fountain capable of shooting up a jet of water 400 to 600 feet (120 to 180 m) into the air.

Not everyone was appreciative of Delacorte's gift to the city. An editorial written by The New York Times called the fountain an "extravagant exercise in esthetic juvenilia," saying that "it is tragic to see $300,000 literally go down the drain" instead of being used to fund other things that could be used by people such as parks, plazas and playgrounds. The editorial also said that Delacorte might be remembered by his fountain as "the wrong-way Corrigan of New York philanthropy."

The fountain was originally expected to be finished in September 1967, which was later pushed back to be in time for New Year's Eve of 1968, and later announced to make its debut during the New York Summer Festival in 1969; its completion kept getting pushed back due to construction delays. Delacorte's Geyser was tested for the first time in June 1969. The fountain was supposed be dedicated in July 1969, but concerns raised by New York City Commissioner of Health Mary C. McLaughlin about spraying polluted water from the East River further delayed the operation of the fountain, requiring the river water to be chlorinated for disinfection. At that time, the area of the river had discharges of raw sewage and was found to contain 160,000 coliform bacteria per 100 milliliters (a level of 2,400 was considered to be safe for bathing). The addition of the chlorination system cost $69,000 and took six months to complete.

=== Dedication and operation ===
The Delacorte Fountain was dedicated on December 1, 1969 in a ceremony attended by George Delacorte and Mayor Lindsay held at the headquarters of the United Nations across the East River. The fountain was supposed to go into permanent operation after its dedication, but joints in the chlorinating system that were being dislodged by tidal flows, waves, and ice chunks along with a cut in an electrical feeder cable resulted in a seven-month delay. The fountain began operating on a regular basis on July 9, 1970 and was scheduled to run for four hours each day, from noon to 2 p.m. and from 8 to 10 p.m., with eight floodlights illuminating the fountain when it was run at night. The Delacorte Geyser was listed in The Guinness Book of Records as the world's tallest fountain, capable of attaining a height of 600 feet (180 m). The world record for the tallest fountain was subsequently taken over by one built for McCulloch Properties in Fountain Hills, Arizona.

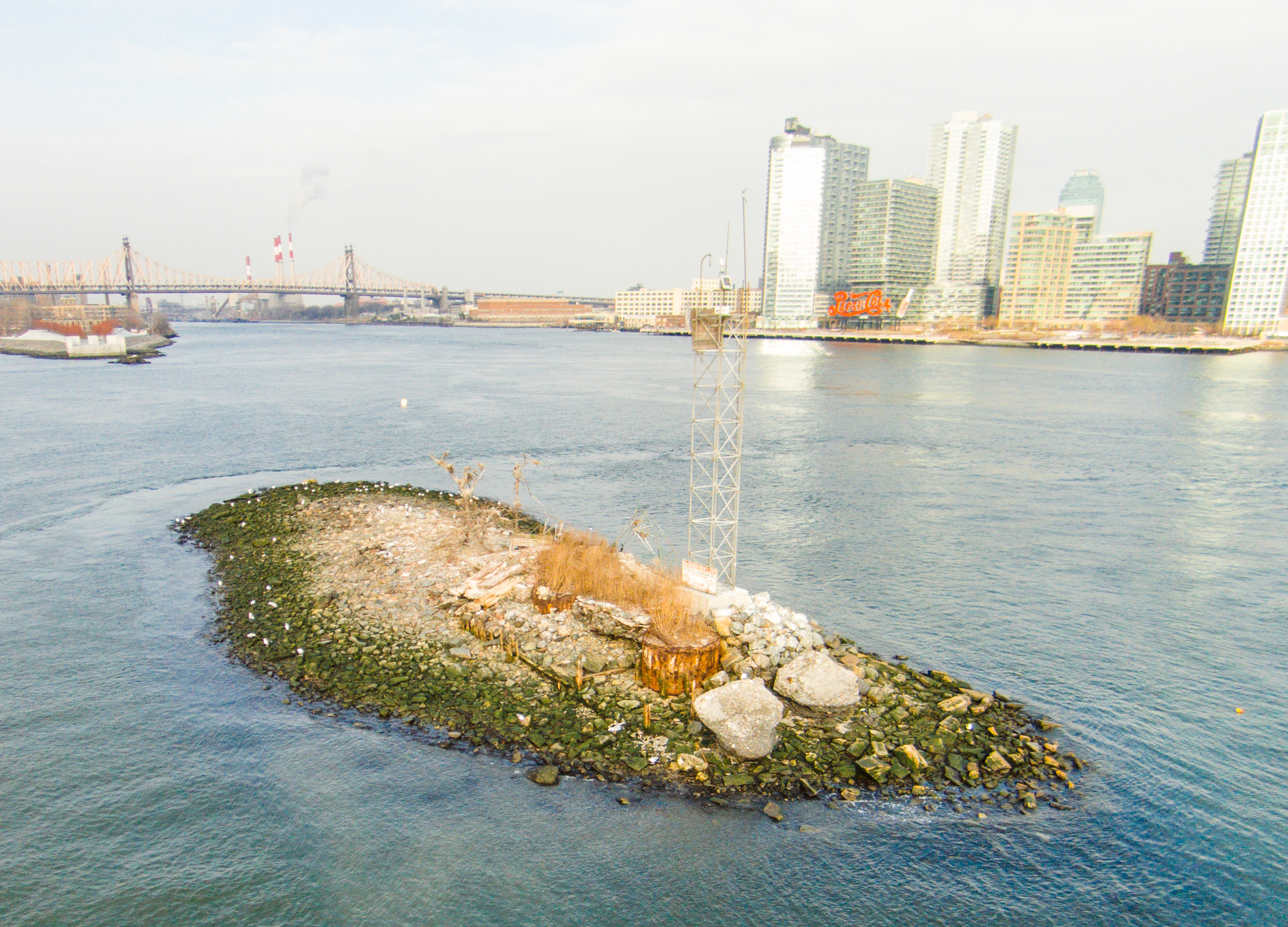
View of Belmont Island in 2015, looking north towards the southern tip of Roosevelt Island

In December 1972, the Dell Publishing Company Foundation filed a suit against the city, the New York State Urban Development Corporation and the Welfare Island Development Corporation to prohibit the fountain from being demolished due to the city's plans to construct housing on the island. A master plan for Welfare Island prepared by architects Philip Johnson and John Burgee in October 1969 had recommended relocating the Delacorte Fountain to Belmont Island, a small islet in the East River located about 1,000 feet (300 m) south of Welfare Island. Welfare Island was renamed Roosevelt Island after Franklin D. Roosevelt in 1973 and a memorial to the former president was planned to be constructed at the southern tip of the island. That same year, the Roosevelt Island was extended 120 feet (37 m) to the south, which resulted in the Delacorte Fountain no longer being located at the island's southern tip.

According to David Ozerkis, the chief engineer for the Roosevelt Island Operating Corporation, the water spray from the Delacorte Fountain caused a constant problem on the island. He said it "really has no business being on an island that people use" and also recommended moving it to Belmont Island, where "it wouldn’t bother anybody." Delacorte considered Belmont Island to be an impractical location for relocating the fountain because a power line would need to be run to the site and accessibility would be an issue since the fountain needed to be serviced on a daily basis.

There were instances when the Delacorte Fountain was not operated due to conservation measures or equipment issues. The fountain was shut down during the 1975 New York City fiscal crisis, saving the city a cost of $48,000 from the fountain's annual electricity bill. It was also turned off during periods of droughts to avoid being viewed as a symbol of conspicuous consumption. The fountain's water intake valve became clogged multiple times due to all kinds of flotsam from the East River, which included a total of 11 drowned bodies. A faulty valve on the fountain prevented it from operating for the first half of 1983. By the mid-1980s, the fountain was capable of only reaching a height of 240 feet (73 m) due to equipment problems. When the fountain was working, it was being turned on four times a day—during the morning and afternoon rush hours, at lunchtime, and in the evening.

In 1985, residents of the Sutton Place neighborhood of Manhattan donated over 50 cedar and pine trees that were planted at the southern tip of the Roosevelt Island to beautify their views of the East River. The residents feared that the chlorinated water from the spray of the fountain would kill the trees and sought a commitment from Delacorte to install a device to shield the trees from the spray. He had engineers investigate the issue, but did not install a protective device because of the cost and that there was no guarantee that the trees would be protected. The trees ended up dying because the topsoil surrounding them had been washed away by the force of falling water from the fountain.

=== Abandonment ===
The fountain last operated in 1986. After repairs were made to fix a corroded electrical feeder cable, a key valve failed when the fountain was turned on. No one wanted to take on the cost of paying for repairs, so the fountain was left abandoned. At that time, Delacorte was over 90 years old and couldn't get an assurance from the Roosevelt Island Operating Corporation that anything would be happening to that part of the island in the next 10 to 20 years. Moving the fountain to another location or building a new one would have been costlier options.

When Delacorte died in 1991 at the age of 97, his obituary in The New York Times mentioned that while both him and his wife called the fountain "Delacorte's Folly" he considered it to be the favorite among his contributions. His other gifts to New York City included several attractions in Central Park: the Alice in Wonderland sculpture, the Delacorte Clock, and the Delacorte Theater.

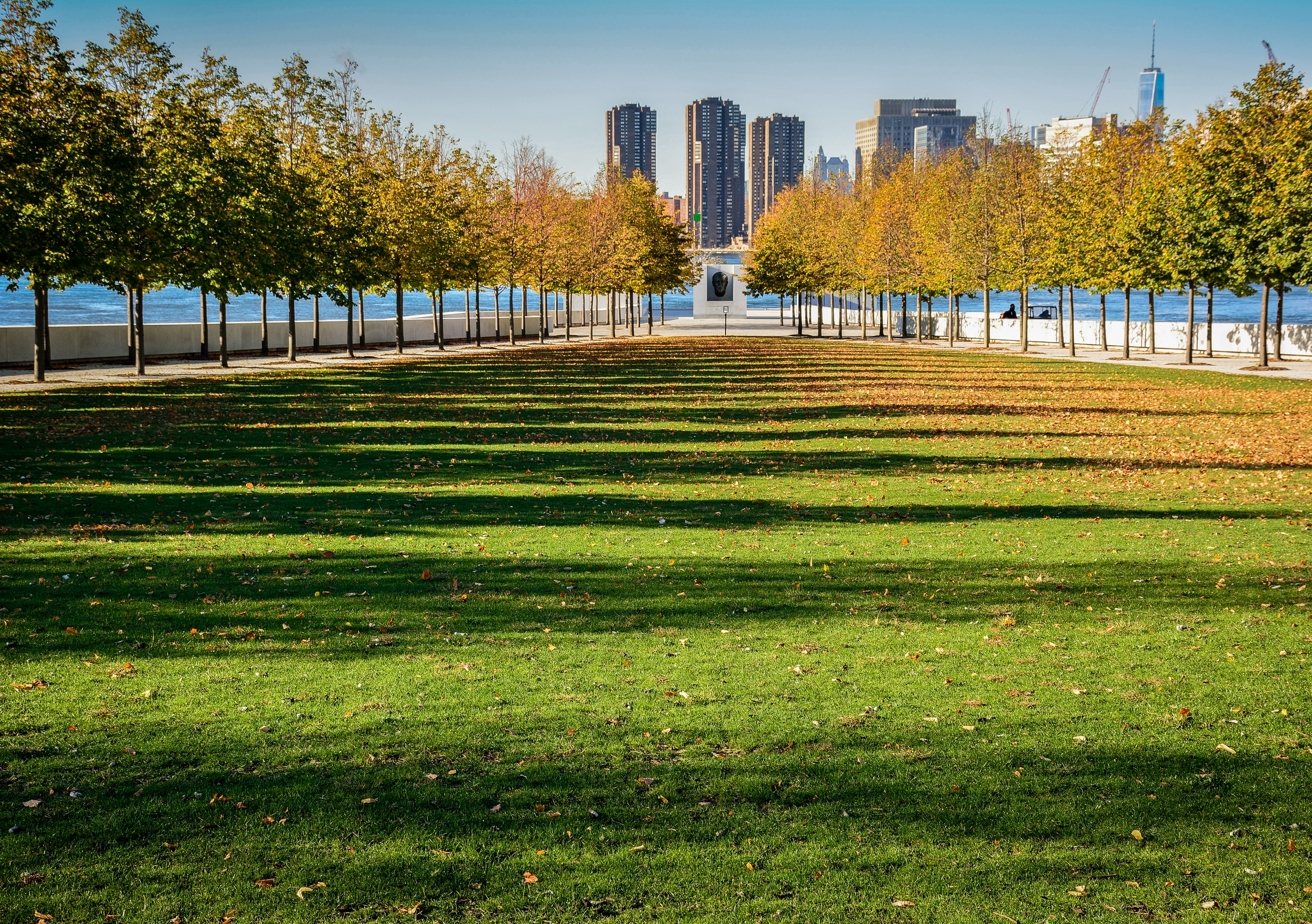
Looking south from Four Freedoms Park in 2015 towards the former site of the Delacorte Fountain

The remains of the Delacorte Fountain, including the building that housed its equipment, were finally demolished in 1994 along with City Hospital. The former site of the fountain is now occupied by Franklin D. Roosevelt Four Freedoms Park, which opened in 2012.

== Design ==
The fountain was built by the Vacar Construction Company and had its equipment housed in an A-frame building that was capable of supporting the full weight of the falling column of water and fabricated from stainless steel to resist corrosion.

Two pumps were used in the fountain—a 800-horsepower (600 kW) horizontal-stroke pump and a 700-horsepower (520 kW) submerged vertical turbine—that together were capable of spraying water at a flowrate of 4,000 US gal/min (250 L/s) through a 4-inch (100 mm) nozzle to a height of up to 600 feet (180 m). The horizontal-stroke pump was designed to operate at a constant rate of flow while the flow produced by the vertical turbine could be changed to adjust the height of the water column produced by the fountain.

The fountain was automatically shut down when winds exceeded 12 miles per hour (19 km/h) to avoid spraying the shores of the East River in Manhattan or Queens. The chlorination system included a 270-foot-long (82 m), 7-foot-wide (2.1 m) galvanized steel pipe that took river water 15 minutes to pass through before reaching the fountain.
