= Delacorte =

Delacorte can refer to:

- George T. Delacorte Jr., founder of the Dell Publishing Company
  - George Delacorte Musical Clock, a 1965 gift from George T. Delacorte, located between the Wildlife Center and the Children's Zoo in Central Park, Manhattan
- Delacorte Press, a Random House related publisher
- Delacorte Theater, in Manhattan's Central Park
