= South Brooklyn Health =

Public hospital in Brooklyn, New York

NYC Health + Hospitals/South Brooklyn Health
- NYC Health + Hospitals
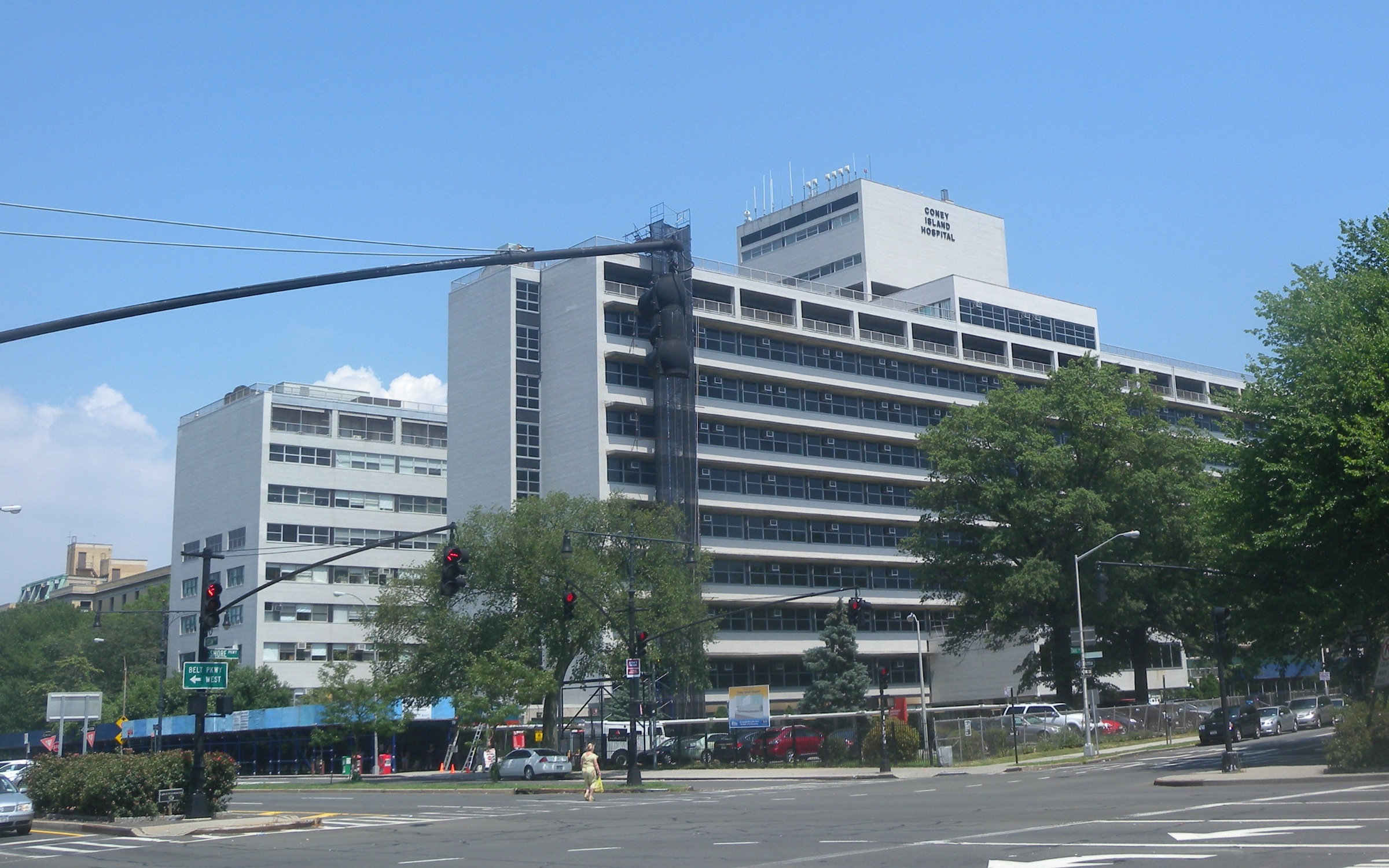

Geography
- Location: 2601 Ocean Parkway, Brooklyn, New York, United States
- Coordinates: 40.5854°N 73.9655°W

Organization
- Care system: Private
- Type: Teaching
- Affiliated university: New York Institute of Technology College of Osteopathic Medicine
- Network: NYC Health + Hospitals

Services
- Beds: 371

History
- Founded: 1875; 151 years ago

Links
- Website: nychhc.org/coneyisland
- Lists: Hospitals in New York State
- Other links: Hospitals in Brooklyn

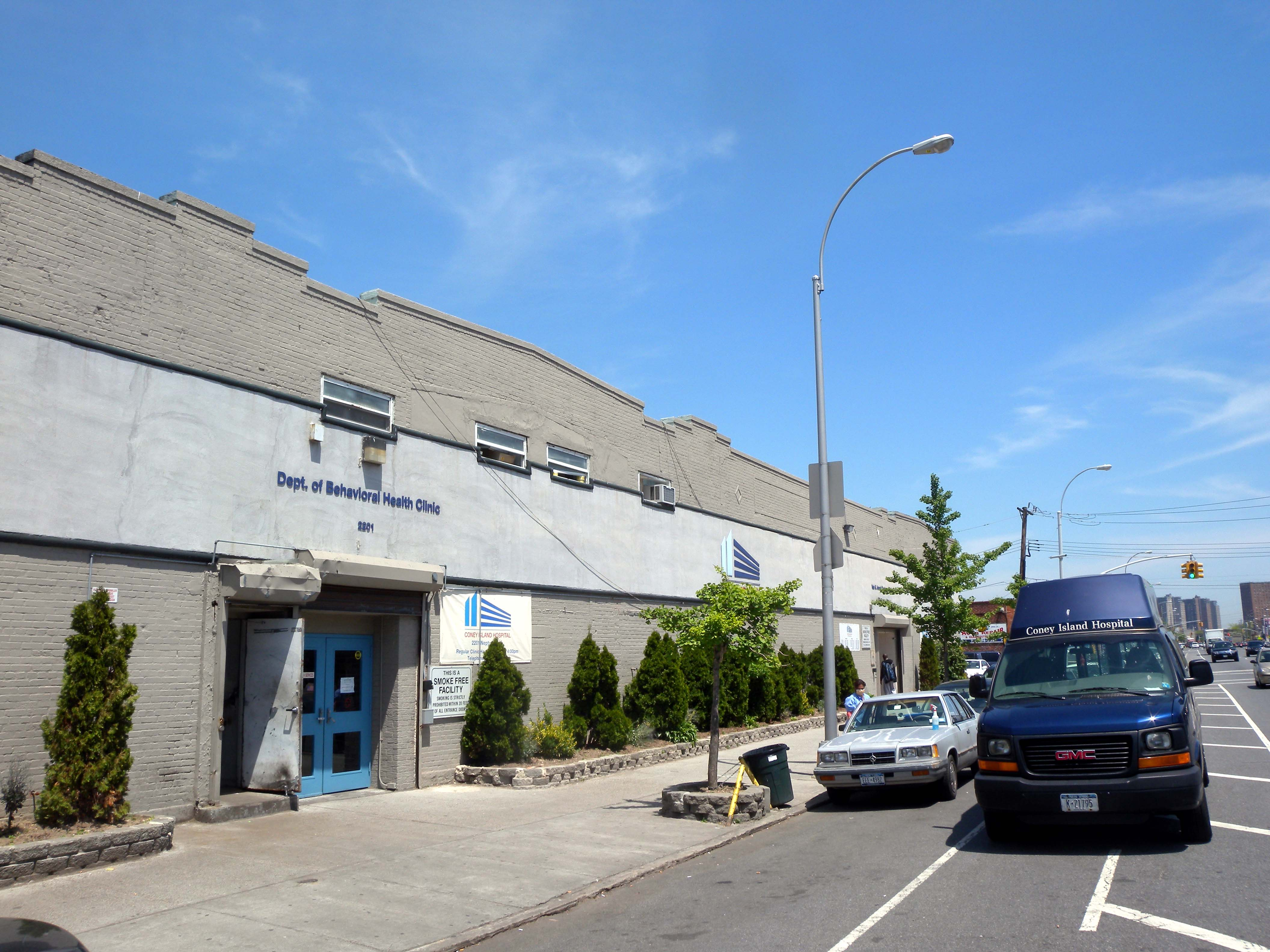
The hospital's Behavioral Health Clinic

NYC Health + Hospitals/South Brooklyn Health is a public teaching hospital located in the Coney Island neighborhood of Brooklyn, New York City. It is owned by NYC Health + Hospitals, a public benefit corporation of the city. The hospital is home to FDNY-EMS Station 43, formerly NYC-EMS Station 31, and is a major clinical affiliate for clinical clerkship with the New York Institute of Technology College of Osteopathic Medicine.

The hospital was previously named Coney Island Hospital. It received its current name in 2023 as part of a reconstruction of the hospital campus that included a replacement of the old main hospital tower with the new Ruth Bader Ginsburg Hospital building.

== History ==
=== 1875–2000 ===
In 1875, Coney Island Hospital began as a first aid station on the oceanfront beach near West Third Street. It was called the Sea Breeze Hospital but officially known as Reception Hospital, an annex of the Kings County Hospital. It had 20 beds and facilities for emergency treatment. Patients requiring more were taken to Kings County Hospital, about seven miles away, in a horse-drawn ambulance.

Construction of "the first part of the Hammett Pavilion, the yellow building facing Ocean Parkway," to build a 100-bed hospital, began in 1908, north of Coney Island Creek and east of Ocean Parkway.

With the help of Robert W. Hebberd, Coney Island Hospital was dedicated on May 18, 1910, then a six-building complex. The Hammett Pavilion was enlarged 1926 to 1928, resulting in 300 beds and five more floors. Population growth continued and so in 1954 the two white brick towers that make up the current hospital were opened.

=== 2000–present ===
In Spring 2006, Coney Island Hospital opened a new inpatient bed tower.

By 2011, the hospital became the biggest employer in southern Brooklyn. Hurricane Irene resulted in the hospital's first full-scale evacuation, since the buildings are located in Flood Zone A. Coney Island Hospital was severely damaged in 2012 due to Hurricane Sandy. The Ida G. Israel Community Health Center was renovated and reopened in 2015.

As a result of the Hurricane Sandy damage, in 2018, construction for an eleven-story structure began to replace the Hammett Pavilion. Hospital officials announced in August 2021 that the new building would be named after the late U.S. Supreme Court justice Ruth Bader Ginsburg. Following the opening of the new building, the hospital was to be renamed to South Brooklyn Health. The Ruth Bader Ginsburg Hospital building opened on May 2, 2023, cost $923 million in total, and includes a statue of Ruth Bader Ginsburg in the lobby.

In February 2025, the Ida G. Israel Community Health Center opened in Coney Island.

== Services ==
The hospital has been recognized for clinical innovations in Primary Care, Adolescent Medicine, Nuclear Medicine and Emergency Services.

At 371 beds, Coney Island Hospital is the major medical service provider in southern Brooklyn with over 15,000 discharges and over 255,000 outpatient visits. The hospital's emergency department was renovated after Hurricane Sandy and now handles nearly 90,000 annual visits. As part of the upcoming renovation, Coney Island Hospital is planned to downsize to 351 beds, but with single-patient rooms in the new building.

== Controversy ==
The 2016 day-after-admission death of a patient who was treated as if emotionally disturbed and shackled to her bed was investigated and found to be due to mistreatment, resulting in "three of the facility’s top officials" leaving their positions and several others reduced in rank or taking early retirement. At the time, there had been reports the "scores of people had been hired at Coney Island Hospital without proper authorization" leading to a budget overrun.

== See also ==
- Robert W. Hebberd
