= Homer Folks =

American sociologist (1867–1963)

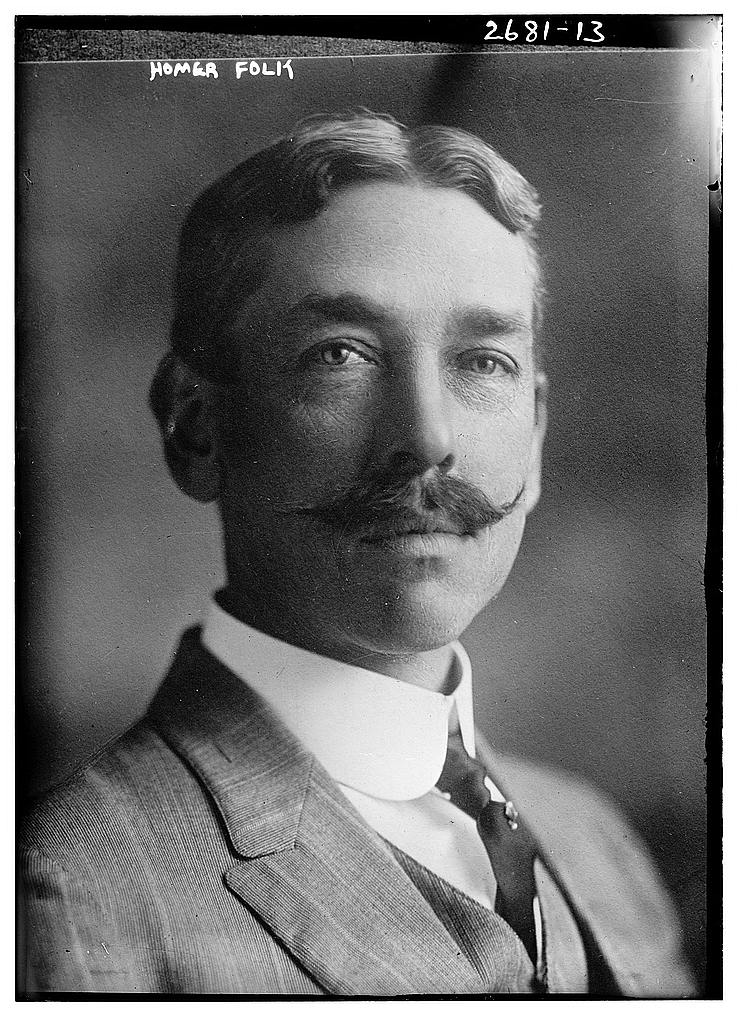
Folks in 1913

Homer C. Folks (February 18, 1867 – February 14, 1963) was a United States sociologist who worked as a social welfare advocate. He was the New York City Commissioner of Public Charities.

== Biography ==
Folks was born in Hanover, Michigan, on February 18, 1867, to James Folks. He attended Albion College in Michigan then Harvard University, where he graduated in 1890.

From 1890 to 1893, Folks was secretary of the Children's Aid Society of Pennsylvania, where he garnered attention for reforming its placing-out system for children. Between 1893 and 1902, Folks served as secretary of the New York State Charities Aid Association. He was an outspoken Protestant leader who opposed the institutionalization of children, and publicly condemned the influence of children's organizations such as the New York Society for the Prevention of Cruelty to Children (NYSPCC) as "feeders of institutions," a criticism echoed by similar groups who compete for public funding and control.

He was elected to the New York City Board of Aldermen as an anti Tammany member in 1897 and 1898, and was an unsuccessful candidate for the New York State Assembly in 1899. In the spring of 1900 he went to Cuba to assist the United States military authorities in reorganizing the public charities of the island. In 1901 he became secretary of the National Conference of Charities and Correction, and in January 1902, was appointed by Mayor Seth Low as Commissioner of Public Charities for New York City. His literary work includes the editing of the Charities Review, and the publication of numerous reports and magazine articles, a book entitled The Care of Destitute, Neglected, and Delinquent Children (1902), and another book, The Human Costs of The War (1920). Homer Folks Hospital, located in Oneonta, New York, named in his honor, opened December 18, 1935, and served as a tuberculosis hospital for almost 38 years.

He died on February 14, 1963, in The Bronx at age 95.

== See also ==
- List of recipients of the Silver Buffalo Award
