= Franklin D. Roosevelt Four Freedoms Park =

Public park in Manhattan, New York

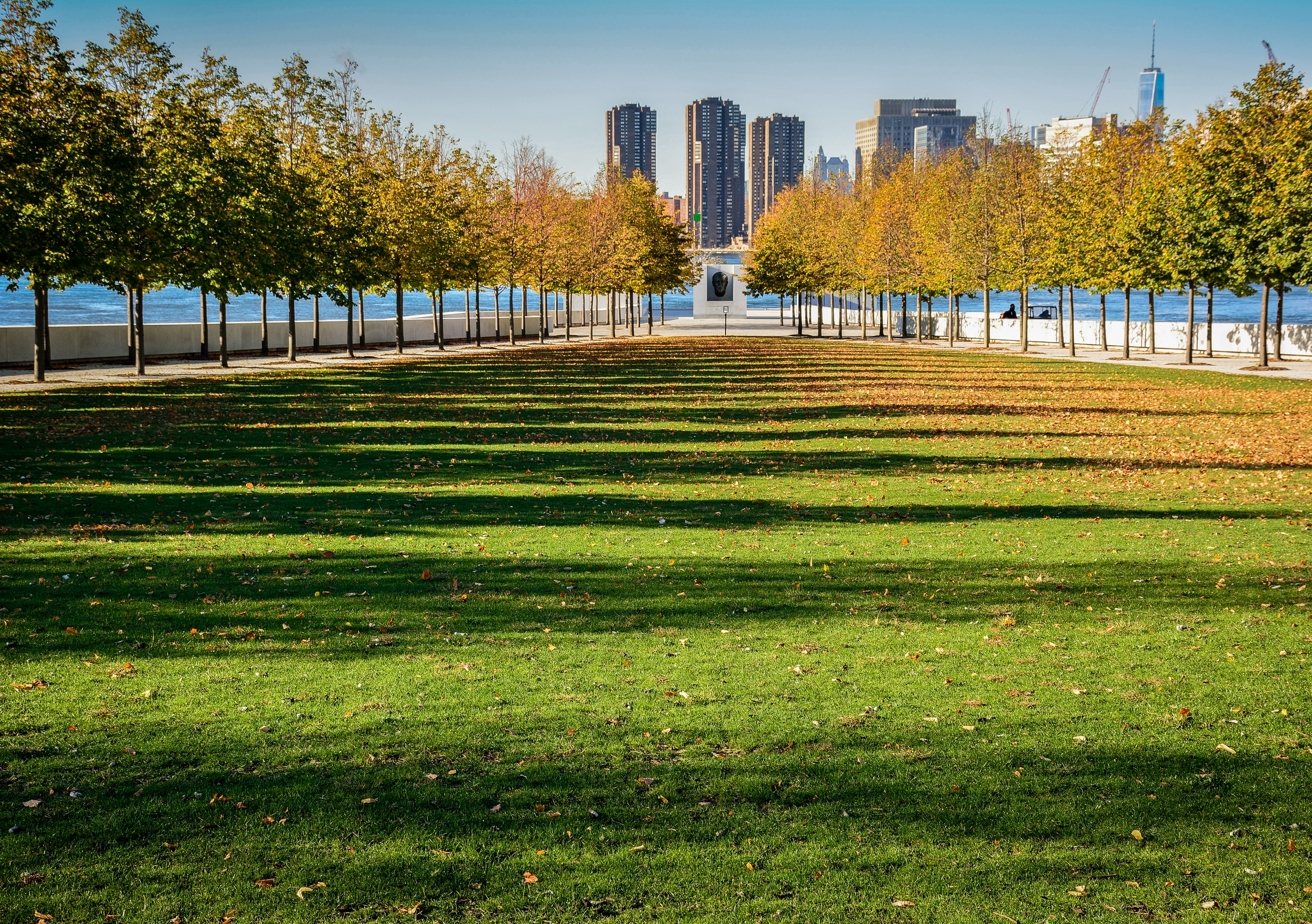
- View from the park toward Lower Manhattan
- Interactive map of Franklin D. Roosevelt Four Freedoms Park
- Type: State park
- Location: Roosevelt Island, Manhattan, NY
- Coordinates: 40°44′59″N 73°57′41″W
- Area: 4 acres (1.6 ha)
- Created: October 17, 2012
- Owner: New York State Office of Parks, Recreation and Historic Preservation
- Operator: Four Freedoms Park Conservancy
- Visitors: 176,372 (in 2021)
- Status: Open all year
- Website: https://fdrfourfreedomspark.org/

The Franklin D. Roosevelt Four Freedoms Park is a four-acre (1.6 ha) memorial to Franklin D. Roosevelt that celebrates the Four Freedoms he articulated in his 1941 State of the Union address. It is located in New York City at the southernmost point of Roosevelt Island, in the East River between Manhattan Island and Queens. It was originally designed by the architect Louis Kahn in 1974, but funds were only secured for groundbreaking in 2010 and completion in 2012.

== History ==
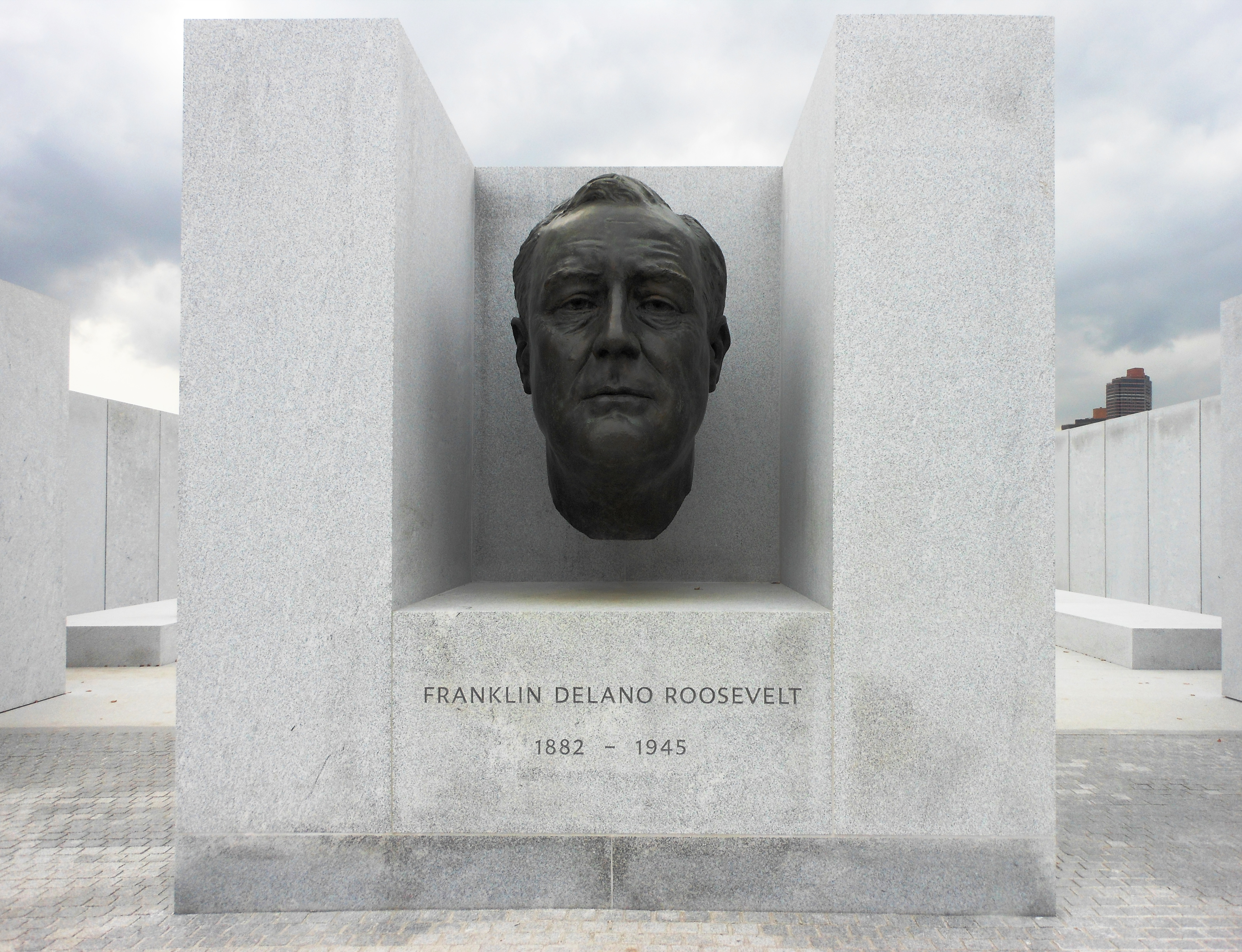
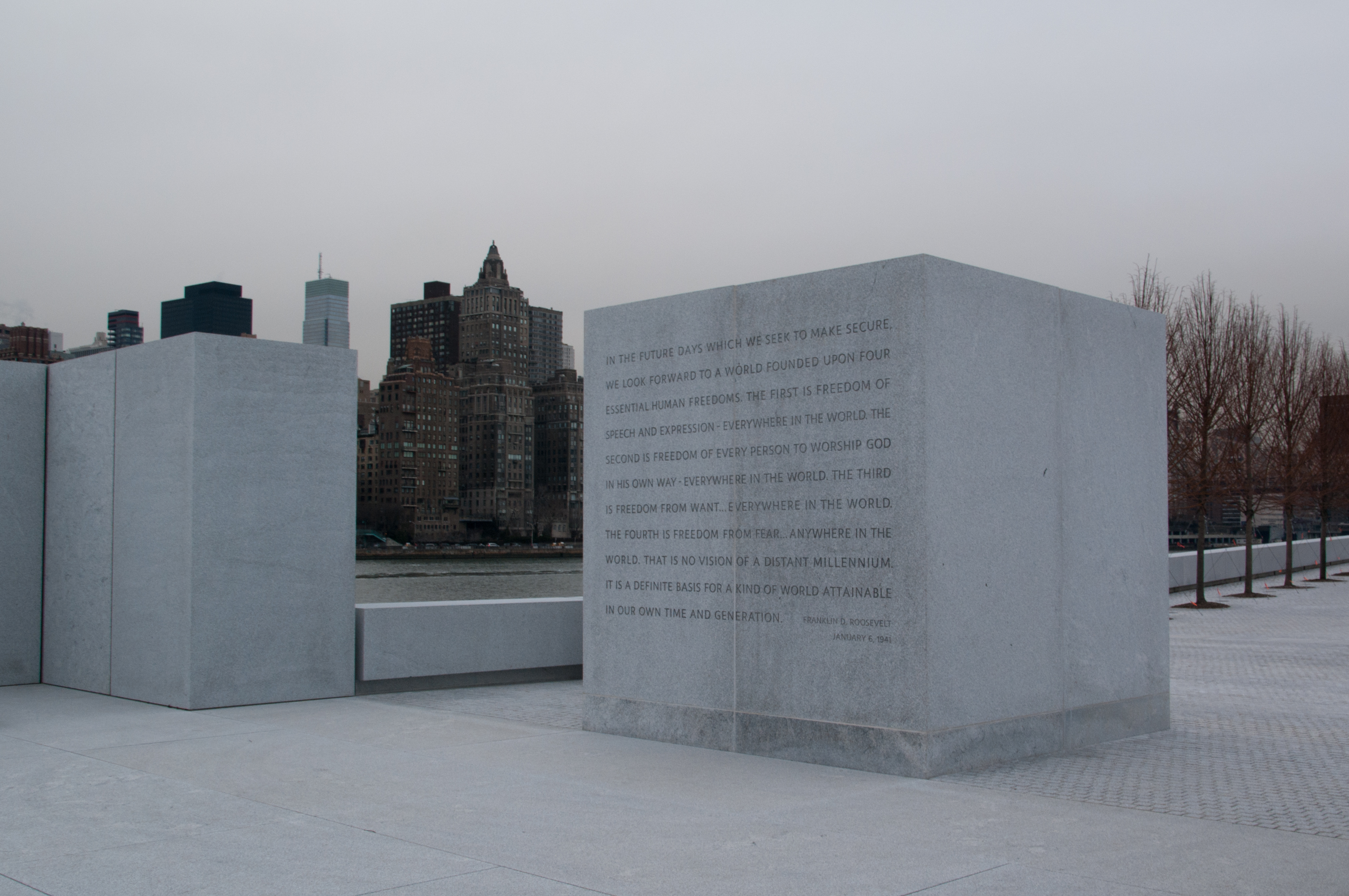
Bust of Franklin D. Roosevelt (top) and a quote from his 1941 Four Freedoms speech (bottom)

=== Context ===
President Roosevelt made his Four Freedoms speech to the United States Congress in 1941. The Four Freedoms speech has inspired and been incorporated in the Four Freedoms Monument in Florida, the Franklin Delano Roosevelt Memorial in Washington, D.C., and Norman Rockwell's series of paintings called the Four Freedoms.

Roosevelt Island was named in honor of the former president in 1973, and the planners announced their intention to build a memorial to Roosevelt at the island's southern tip. In 2005, William J. vanden Heuvel, a former U.N. ambassador and a founder of the Franklin and Eleanor Roosevelt Institute, launched the effort to get the four-acre park built to Kahn's specifications, gathering more than $50 million in private and public funds. The Franklin and Eleanor Roosevelt Institute subsequently kept the project going over time. Two foundations that became major donors, the Reed Foundation and the Alphawood Foundation, initiated a lawsuit against the corporation that managed the development of the memorial in a dispute over how their contributions should be acknowledged. The foundations said they were promised their names would appear close to the bust. Those responsible for the memorial's construction did not dispute that. Rather, vanden Heuvel said: "Yes, we have a contract that we believe is now a mistake. As we came to the spring of 2012, we understood that we had a work of art, and the forces that represent the artistic and cultural integrity of the project are concerned about preserving that work. The purity and integrity of the Kahn memorial is what made it so stunning."

=== Construction and opening ===
Louis Kahn was asked to design the monument in 1972. Four Freedoms Park is one of Kahn's last works. He was carrying the finished designs with him when he died in 1974 at New York City's Pennsylvania Station. After Kahn's death, his designs were continued by Mitchell/Giurgola Architects, who kept to Kahn's original intentions.

Earthwork for the future memorial was started in 1994 by Langan Engineering as part of a project to demolish the Delacorte Fountain and City Hospital.

An exhibition at Cooper Union in 2005 brought additional attention and helped to advance the project. In 2006, ENYA (Emerging New York Architects) made the island's abandoned southern end the subject of one of its annual competitions. Groundbreaking took place in 2010. However, the park was tied up in litigation during its construction.

The park was dedicated in a ceremony on October 17, 2012. Tom Brokaw served as master of ceremonies. Participants included former President Bill Clinton, Governor Andrew Cuomo, former Mayor Michael Bloomberg, and relatives of Roosevelt. Cuomo said that "New York became the laboratory of progressive democracy, and F.D.R. was the scientist creating formulas for a broad range of national problems and social ills." He praised vanden Heuvel as a "juggernaut of determination". Clinton noted the memorial's location: "As we look out on this bright new day, we are close to the U.N., which he, more than any other soul, created." Four Freedoms Park became a New York State Park when it opened to the public on October 24, 2012.

=== Later history ===
In June 2015, 2016 presidential candidate Hillary Clinton chose the park site for her first major campaign rally.

In June 2019, to coincide with the fifty-year anniversary of the Stonewall riots, steps at the park were turned into the largest LGBTQ pride flag. The rainbow-decorated 12-by-100-foot (3.7 m × 30.5 m) staircase Ascend With Pride was installed June 14–30.

== Architecture ==
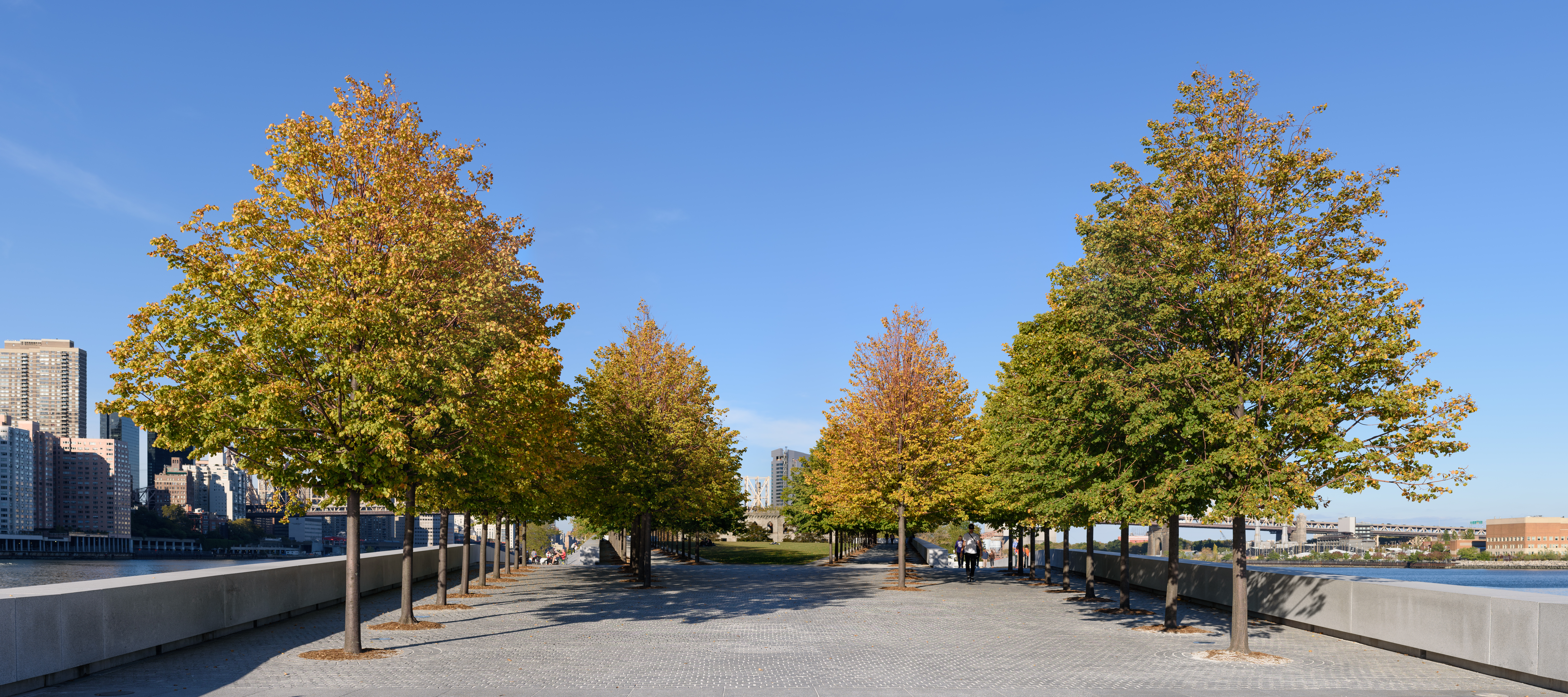
Little-leaf linden allée

In a 1973 lecture at Pratt Institute, Kahn said:

I had this thought that a memorial should be a room and a garden. That's all I had. Why did I want a room and a garden? I just chose it to be the point of departure. The garden is somehow a personal nature, a personal kind of control of nature. And the room was the beginning of architecture. I had this sense, you see, and the room wasn't just architecture, but was an extension of self.

The four-acre (1.6 ha) park stands at the southernmost point of Roosevelt Island. Looking south, the visitor has a clear view of the headquarters of the United Nations (particularly the United Nations Secretariat Building); to the north of the park is the Queensboro Bridge, which spans the East River. Approaching from the north, the visitor passes between a double row of trees that narrow as they approach the point, framing views of the New York skyline and the harbor. The memorial is a procession of elegant open-air spaces, culminating in a 3,600-square-foot (330 m^{2}) plaza surrounded by 28 blocks of North Carolina granite, each weighing 36 tons. The courtyard contains a bust of Roosevelt, sculpted in 1933 by Jo Davidson.

At the point, the monument itself is a simplified, roofless version of a Greek temple in granite. Excerpts from Roosevelt's Four Freedoms speech are carved on the walls of this room-like space, which is open to the sky above.

The memorial is constructed entirely in Mount Airy Granite sourced from the North Carolina Granite Corporation. Over 140,000 cubic feet (4,000 m^{3}) of Mount Airy Granite was used in the memorial's construction. In contrast with the hard granite forms, Kahn placed five copper-beech trees at the memorial's entrance and 120 little-leaf lindens in allées leading up to the monument.

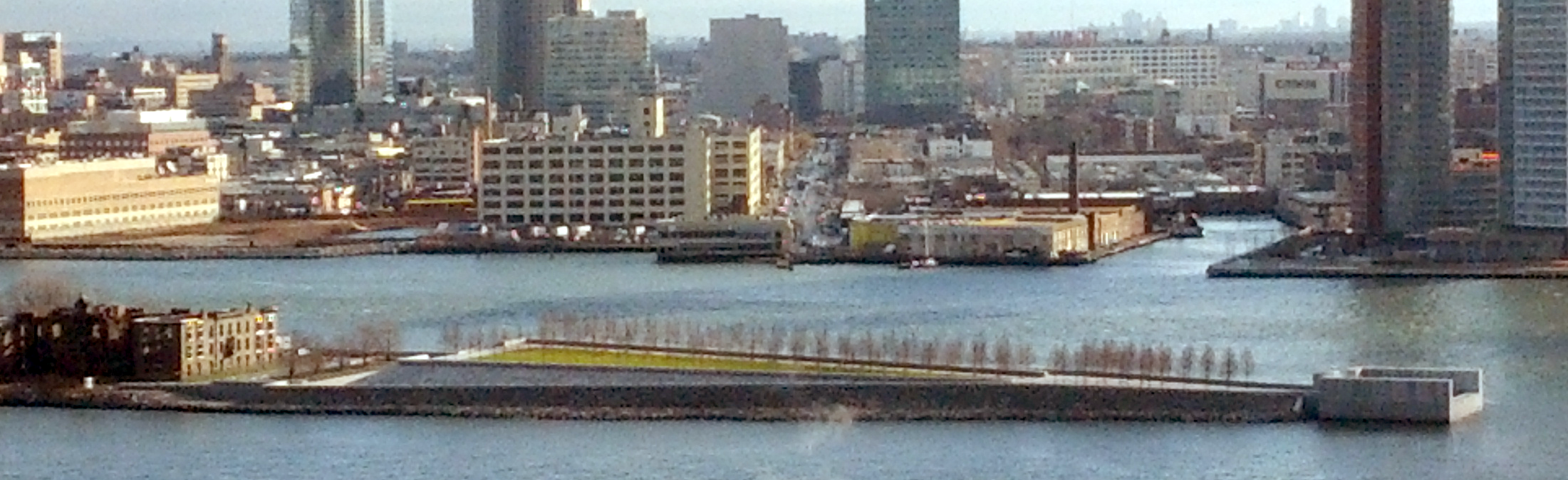
The park, as seen looking east from Manhattan Island

== In media ==
- In Showtime's Billions (Season 4, Episode 6), Taylor Mason and Wendy Rhoades meet at the Franklin D. Roosevelt Four Freedoms Park and discuss Louis Kahn's genius and his relationship with his estranged son.

== See also ==
- List of New York state parks
- Presidential memorials in the United States
