= City Hospital (Roosevelt Island) =

- U.S. National Register of Historic Places
- New York State Register of Historic Places
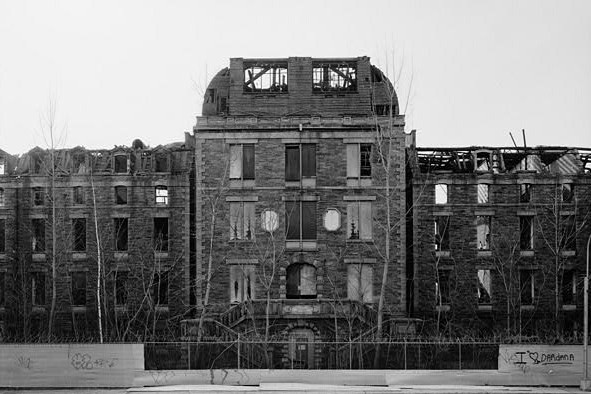
- Abandoned building in 1989

- Location within New York City Location within New York Location within the United States
- Location: Roosevelt Island, Manhattan, New York City
- Coordinates: 40°45′11″N 73°57′31″W
- Area: less than one acre
- Built: 1832
- Architect: James Renwick Jr.
- NRHP reference No.: 72000868
- NYSRHP No.: 06101.002470

Significant dates
- Added to NRHP: March 16, 1972
- Designated NYSRHP: June 23, 1980

City Hospital (also known as Island Hospital or Charity Hospital) was a hospital on Roosevelt Island, Manhattan in New York City.

== History ==
Originally named Penitentiary Hospital and located on what was then known as Blackwell's Island, the first hospital was built in 1832 to serve the prisoners housed at Blackwell's Penitentiary. After the hospital was destroyed by a fire in 1858, architect James Renwick Jr. designed a new building to be called City Hospital, on which prisoners completed construction in 1861. It served both inmates and New York City's poorer population. In 1870, the hospital was renamed Charity Hospital and a medical superintendent was hired after the quality of care was criticized.

In 1877, Charity Hospital opened a school of nursing, the fourth such training institution in the United States. The program of education for nurses encompassed two to three years of training in the care of patients and general hospital cleanliness. At Charity Hospital, nurses treated patients, assisted surgeons, weighed and cared for newborns, and took cooking classes. In 1916, Dr. Orrin Sage Wightman, an internist at the hospital, took a series of photographs of student nurses, which are housed at the New-York Historical Society.

The city changed the name of the island to Welfare Island in 1921 to reflect the mission of the institutions located there.

== Abandonment ==
The prison closed in 1935, and the hospital was closed in 1957, when operations for Charity Hospital and Smallpox Hospital were moved to Elmhurst Hospital Center in Queens. The building, designed in the Second Empire style, was added to the National Register of Historic Places in 1972. The next year, Welfare Island was renamed Roosevelt Island in honor of Franklin D. Roosevelt and a memorial to the former president was planned at the southern tip of the island.

By 1986, the hospital was being considered for demolition because its condition had deteriorated so much. The hospital was demolished in 1994 along with the Delacorte Fountain in a project led by the Roosevelt Island Operating Corporation that also included the earthwork for the future memorial to Franklin D. Roosevelt; this memorial opened as Four Freedoms Park in 2012.

The former site of City Hospital is now occupied by Southpoint Park, which opened in 2011. Stones salvaged from the structure were used in paths of the park.
