= Delacorte Clock =

Clock, art installation in New York City

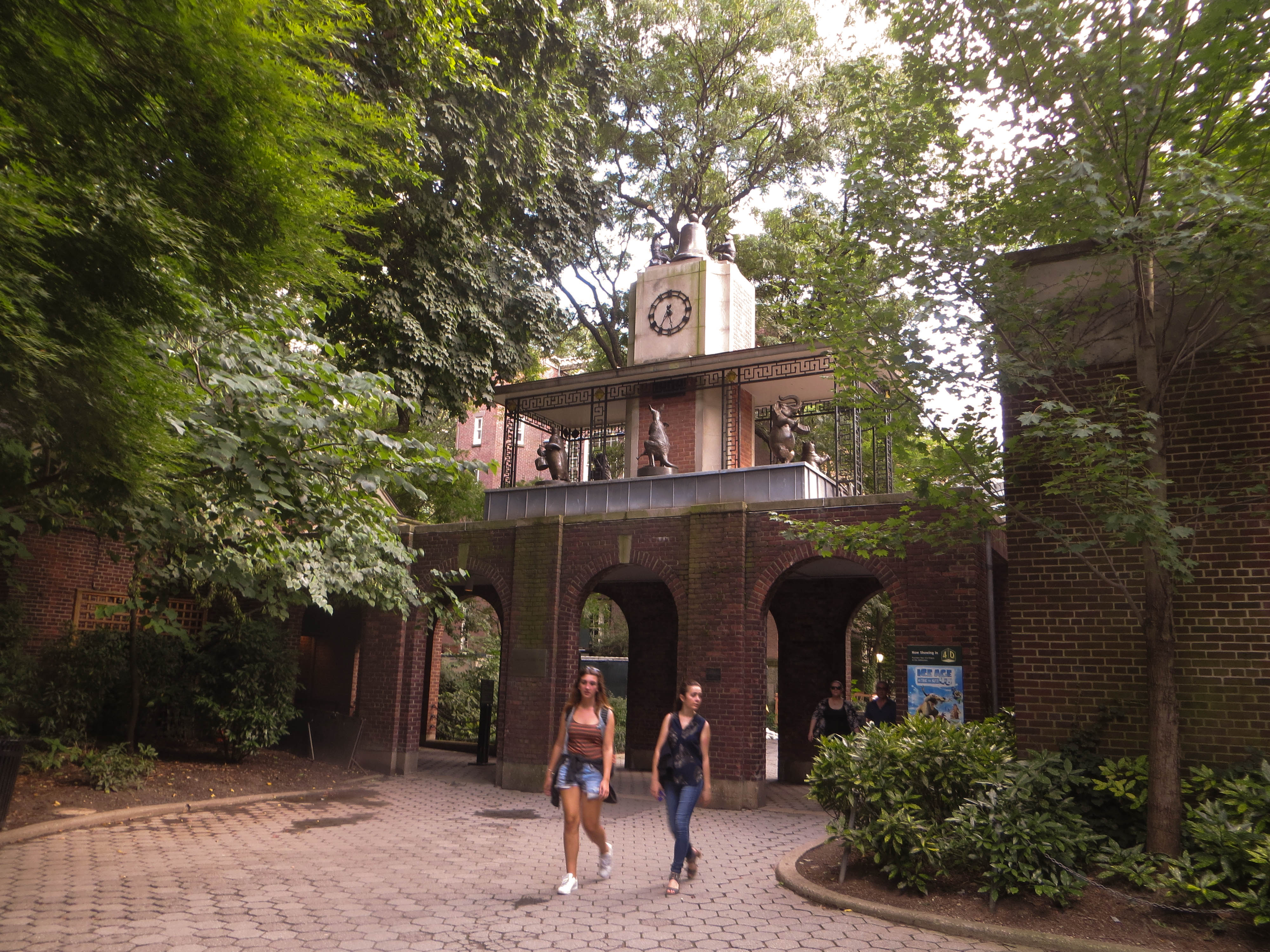
- The clock in 2017
- Location: New York City, New York, U.S.; 40.768053°N 73.971103°W

The Delacorte Clock, or George Delacorte Musical Clock, is a clock and art installation outside the Central Park Zoo in Central Park, Manhattan, New York. The clock, dedicated in 1965, is named for its benefactor George T. Delacorte Jr..

Inspired by intricate European automaton clocks, Delacorte approached Parks Commissioner Robert Moses and proposed building a similar automated clock in Central Park for children. An arcaded gateway between pre-existing zoo building was constructed to house the clock, which contains eight motorized bronze statues of animals playing musical instruments created by the Italian sculptor Andrea Spadini.

Every 30 minutes from 8 a.m. and 6 p.m, the Delacorte Clock plays an automated parade of the animals paired and a chime melody from a nursery rhyme or seasonal song. The clock, maintained by the Central Park Conservancy, is regarded as an iconic monument of Central Park.

== History ==
Publisher and philanthropist George Delacorte was inspired to create the Delacorte Clock during a European vacation after seeing intricate glockenspiel and automaton clocks in medieval town squares, including the Swiss Zytglogge. Delacorte proposed an automated clock designed to appeal to children in Central Park to Parks Commissioner Robert Moses and donated the requisite funds. Delacorte had previously funded Central Park's Alice in Wonderland sculpture (1959) and its Delacorte Theater (1962).

An arcaded gateway was constructed between the main Central Park Zoo quadrangle and the Monkey House (now the Zoo School) to support the clock. Composed of brick and limestone, the gateway was designed by Spanish artist Fernando Texidor and American architect Edward Coe Embury, the son of the Central Park Zoo designer Aymar Embury II. Italian sculptor Andrea Spadini created eight bronze animal sculptures to sit beside the bell and to move on a carousel—partially enclosed by iron grillwork—around the clock.

The clock was unveiled in 1965. At the dedication, Moses praised Delacorte and noted that "small precious things at strategic places... give personality to abstractions and humanity to urban pandemonium." An endowment created by Delacorte's family funded the Central Park Conservancy's restoration of the clock in 1995. The clock's electric components were replaced and updated with a digital timing system in 2017. The New York City Department of Parks and Recreation describes the clock as "one of the most beloved monuments in the parks of New York City", while the Central Park Conservancy calls it a "beloved gem" among Central Park visitors.

== Clock statues and mechanism ==
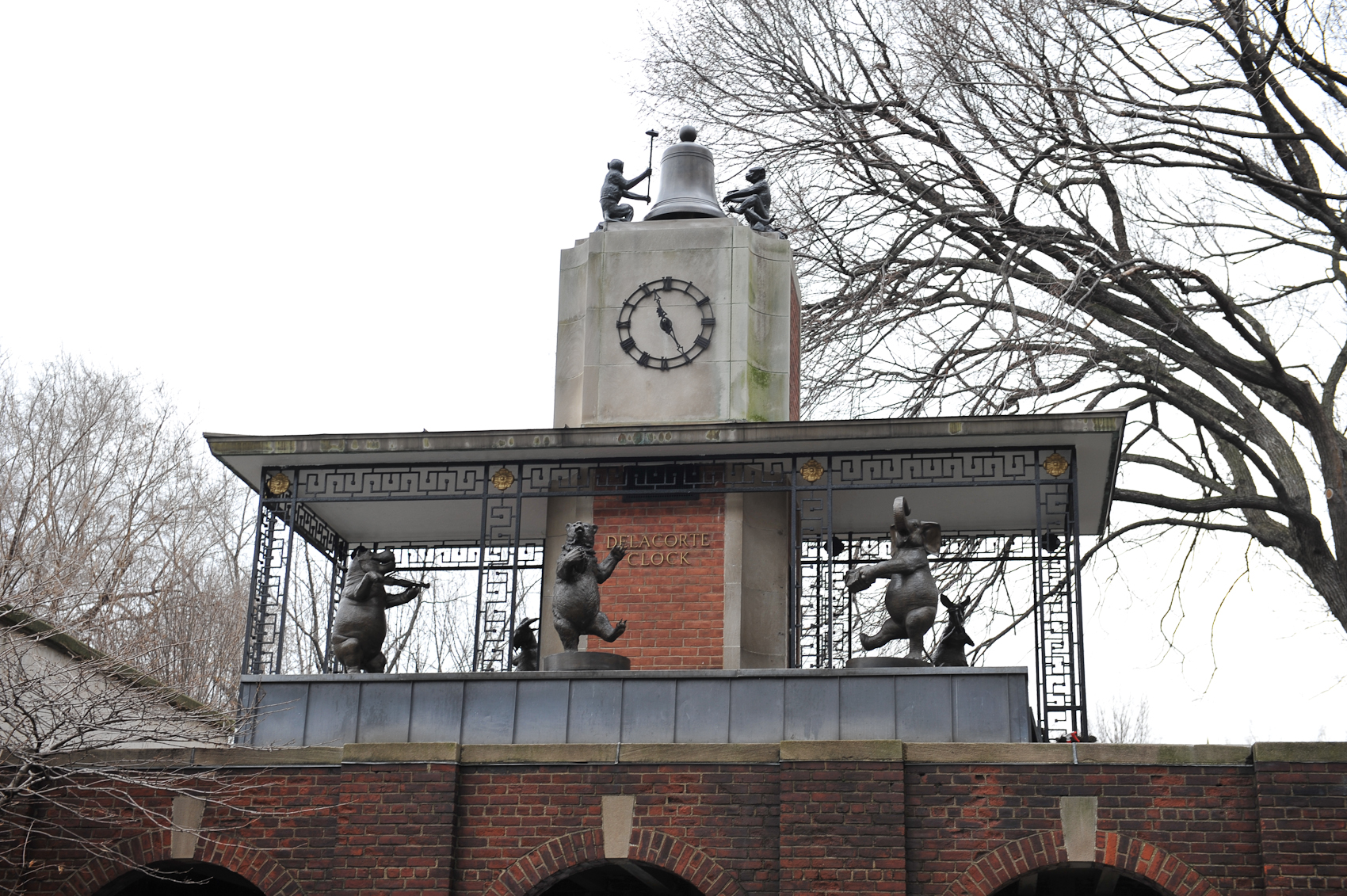
The parade of animals on the Delacorte Clock, with the two striking monkeys above

The clock depicts a statue parade of six animals playing musical instruments—a bear on the tambourine, an elephant on the accordion, a goat on the horn, a hippo on the violin, a kangaroo on the French horn, and a penguin on the drums—as well as two monkeys with mallets besides the bell. After the monkeys strike the bell, the six other animals travel around the clock on a motorized carousel, with each also rotating independently.

This motorized show occurs every 30 minutes from 8:00 a.m. until 6:00 p.m. It is paired with a chime melody corresponding to a seasonal holiday song or one of 32 nursery rhymes. Mechanical performances at the half-hour (e.g. 8:30 a.m.) are shorter. A Central Park Conservancy preservationist clears debris from the statues' track daily. The bronze statues also receive regular cleaning and an annual wax coating.

Delacorte Clock carousel statues

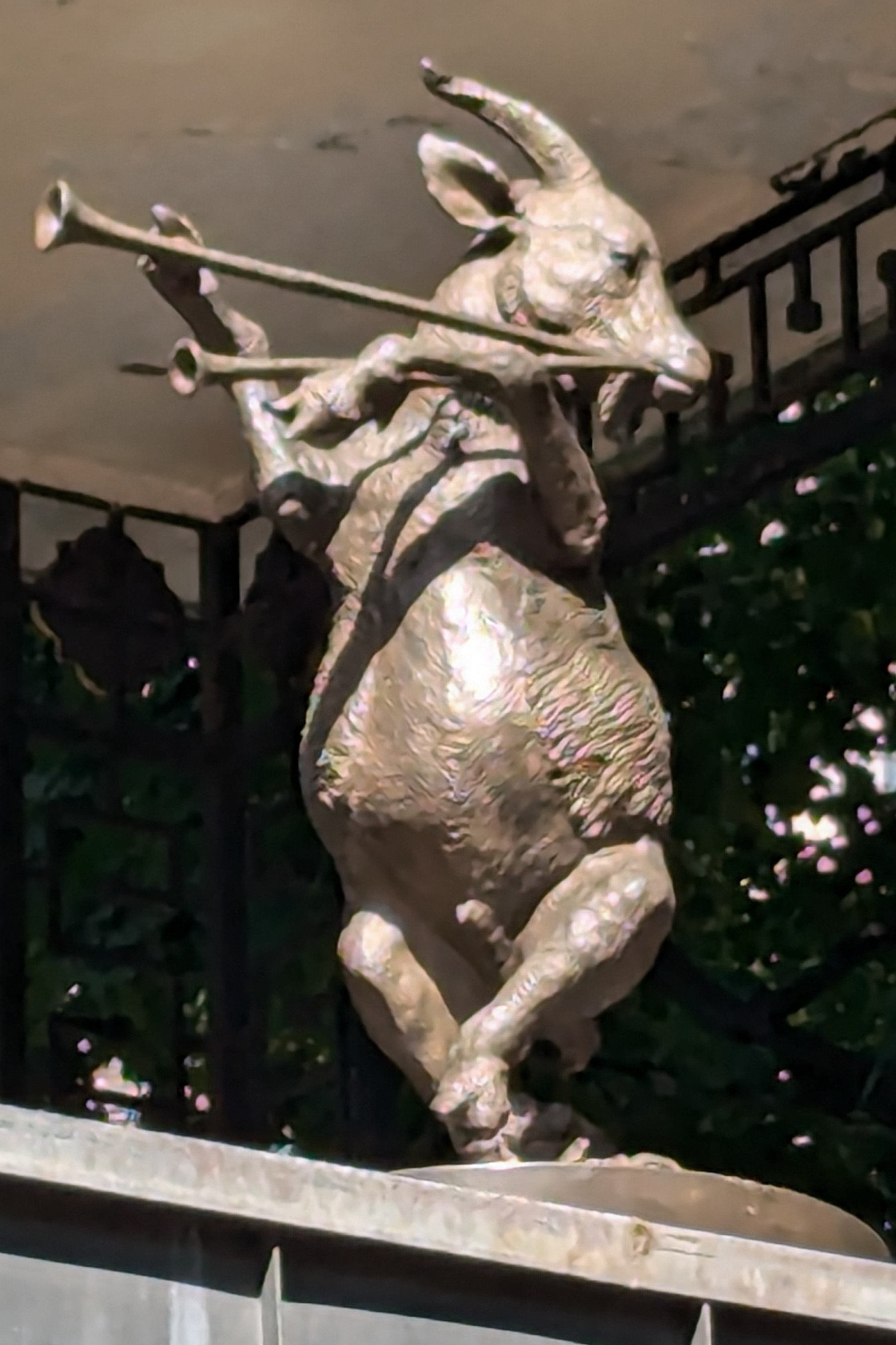
Goat

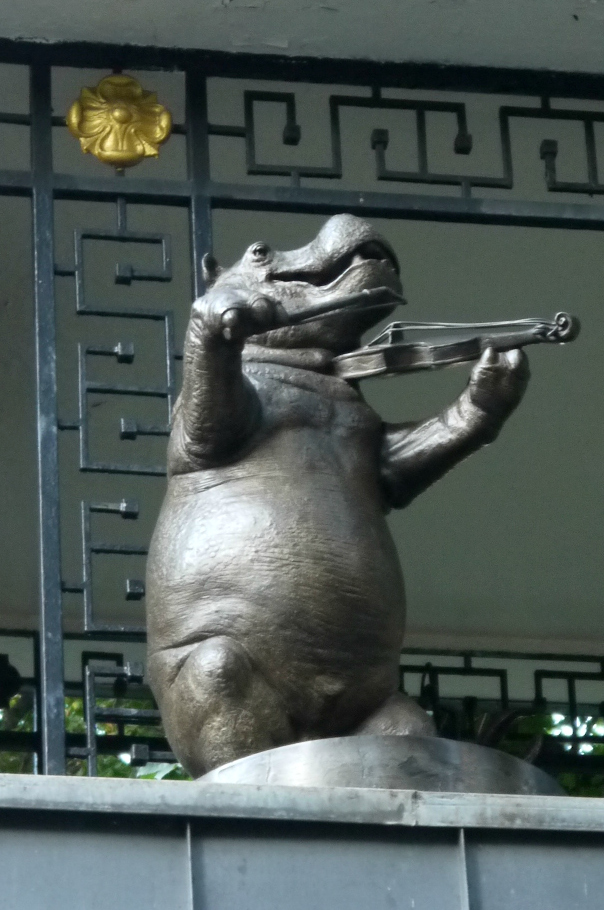
Hippo

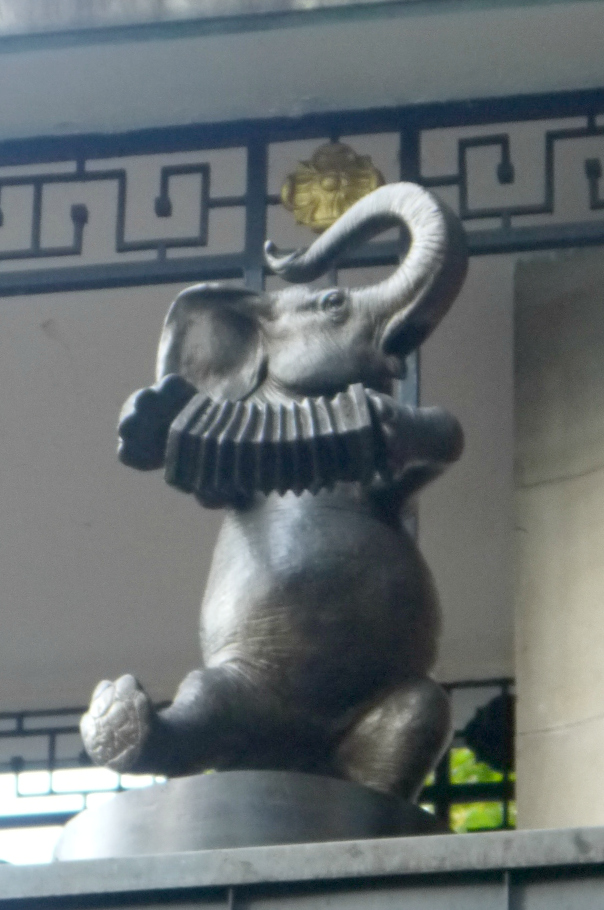
Elephant

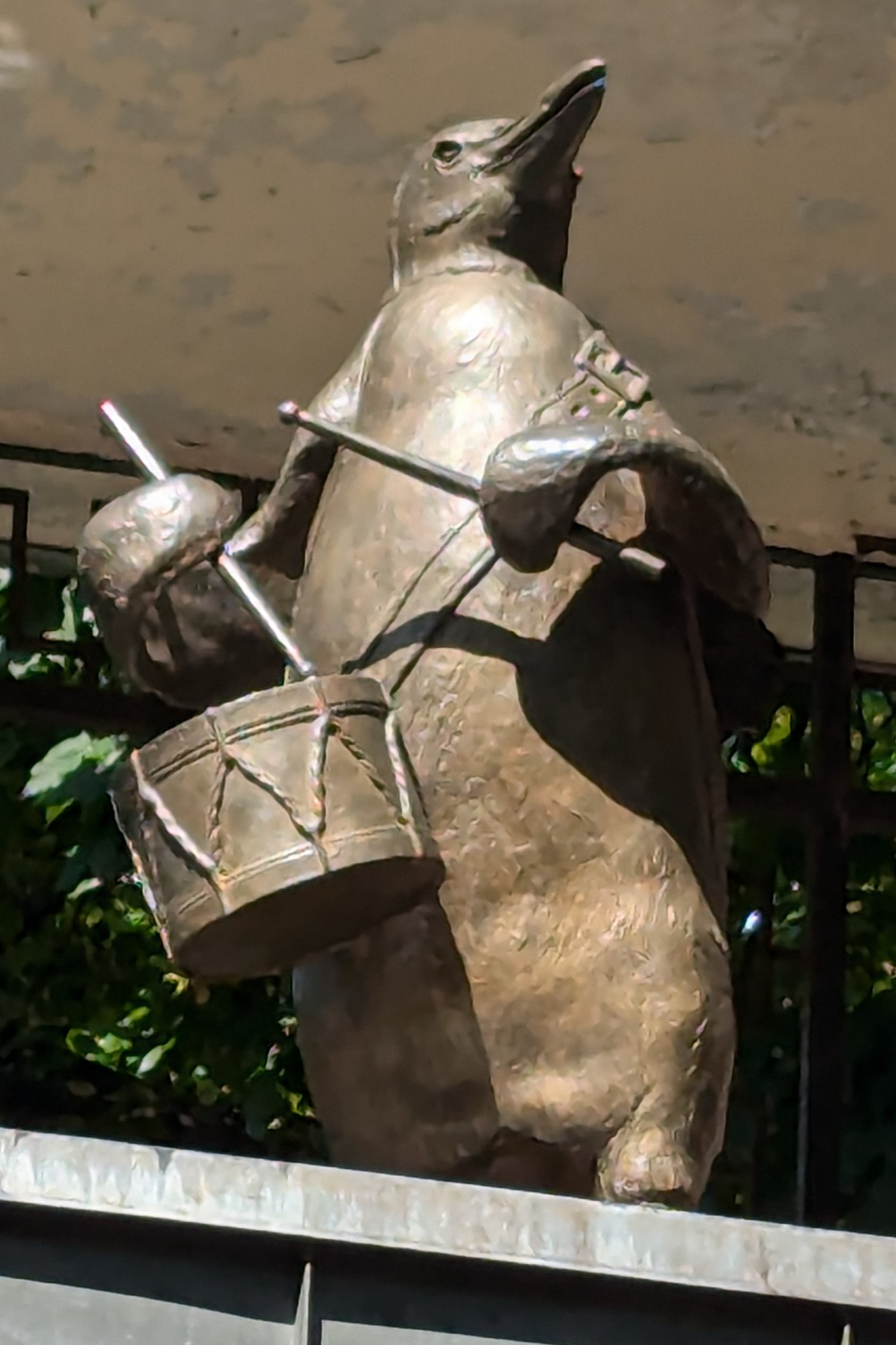
Penguin

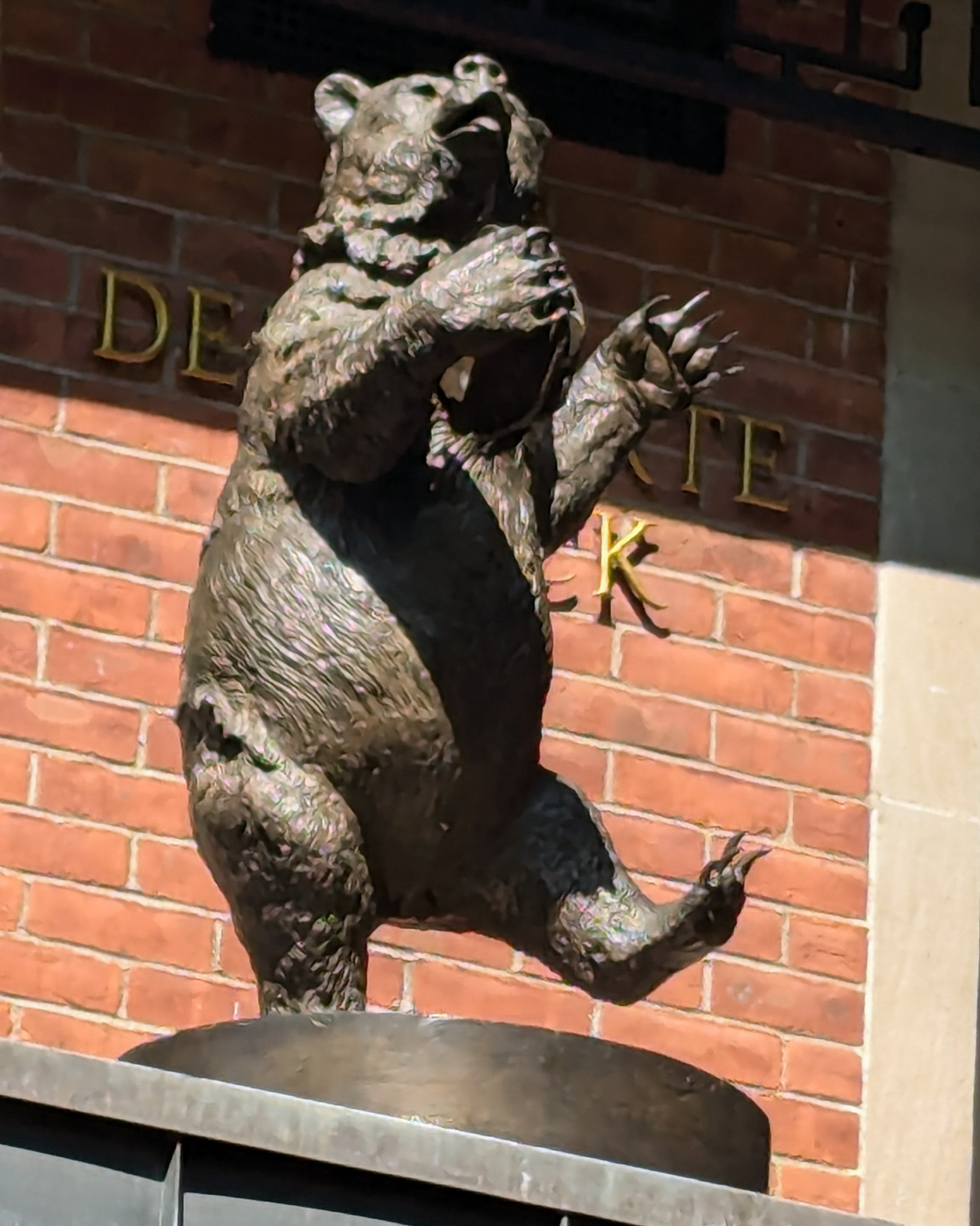
Bear

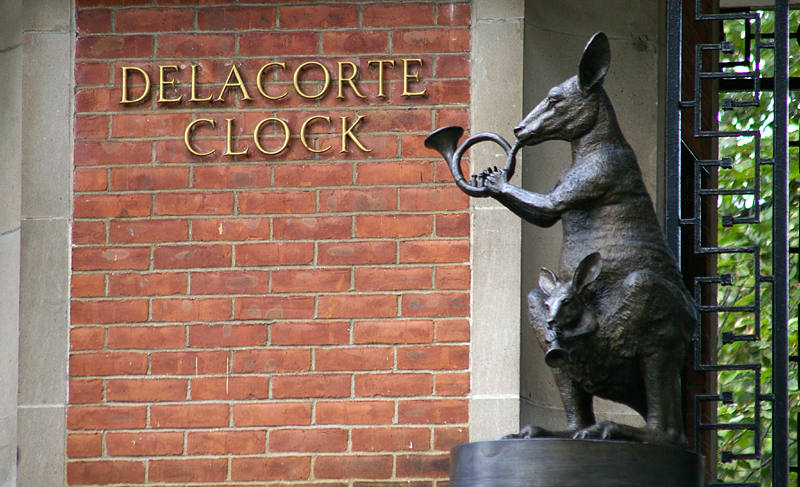
Kangaroo
