= Commissioner of Public Charities =

The Commission of Public Charities was an organization that existed in New York City in the late 19th and early 20th century.

== Commissioners ==
- Silas B. Croft 1896
- James Rowan O'Beirne 1897 to 1901
- John W. Keller 1901
- Homer Folks 1902
- James H Tully 1903
- Robert W. Hebberd 1905 to 1910
- Michael J. Drummond 1910
- William R. Stewart (New York) 1913
- John A. Kingsbury 1914 to 1917
