= Eugene Tonkonogy =

- Born: Eugene Tonkonogy; 1905; Brooklyn, New York
- Died: 30 December 2001 (aged 95); Manhattan, New York
- Education: Cornell University; Columbia Law School
- Occupations: Entrepreneur and adventurer
- Spouse: Ruth Horowitz (1935–1995)
- Children: Peggy Ann (born August 28, 1947); Susan
- Writing career
- Language: English

Eugene K. Tonkonogy (1905 – December 30, 2001) was an entrepreneur, lawyer, and owner of the island Marina Cay.

== Early life and education ==
Tonkonogy was born in Brooklyn in 1905. His father was a lawyer and real-estate investor. He had nine siblings, including George T. Delacorte, Jr. and Gertrude Friedberg.

He completed an undergraduate degree at Cornell University, where he was an All-American in lacrosse. He was inducted into the senior honor society Sphinx Head. He later completed a law degree from Columbia University.

He married Ruth Horowitz in 1935. They remained married for 60 years until her death in 1995.

== Career ==
Tonkonogy worked for his father-in-law's insurance brokerage firm but later took an interest in real estate. He specialized in lining up investment properties with wealthy investors, which resulting in property developments in East Hampton in the 1940s and 1950s.

Tonkonogy first learned about the Caribbean island Marina Cay after reading an article by Robb White in Esquire. After years of persuading both the owner to sell the island and the British colonial governor to grant him a license, he purchased the island, which he used as a private retreat and also rented out as a tourist property.

I always wanted to own an island, I hankered after one as soon as I read my first adventure story as a boy.

— Eugene Tonkonogy being interviewed in 1982

In his 70s, Tonkonogy fulfilled a lifetime dream of marching in the Macy's Thanksgiving Day Parade as a clown. He continued to volunteer as a clown in the parade every year for 20 years, finally relenting due to age.

== Death ==
Tonkonogy died on December 30, 2001, in Manhattan, aged 95. He was survived by his daughters, Susan and Peggy Ann, and one granddaughter.
