= Marina Cay =

Island of the British Virgin Islands

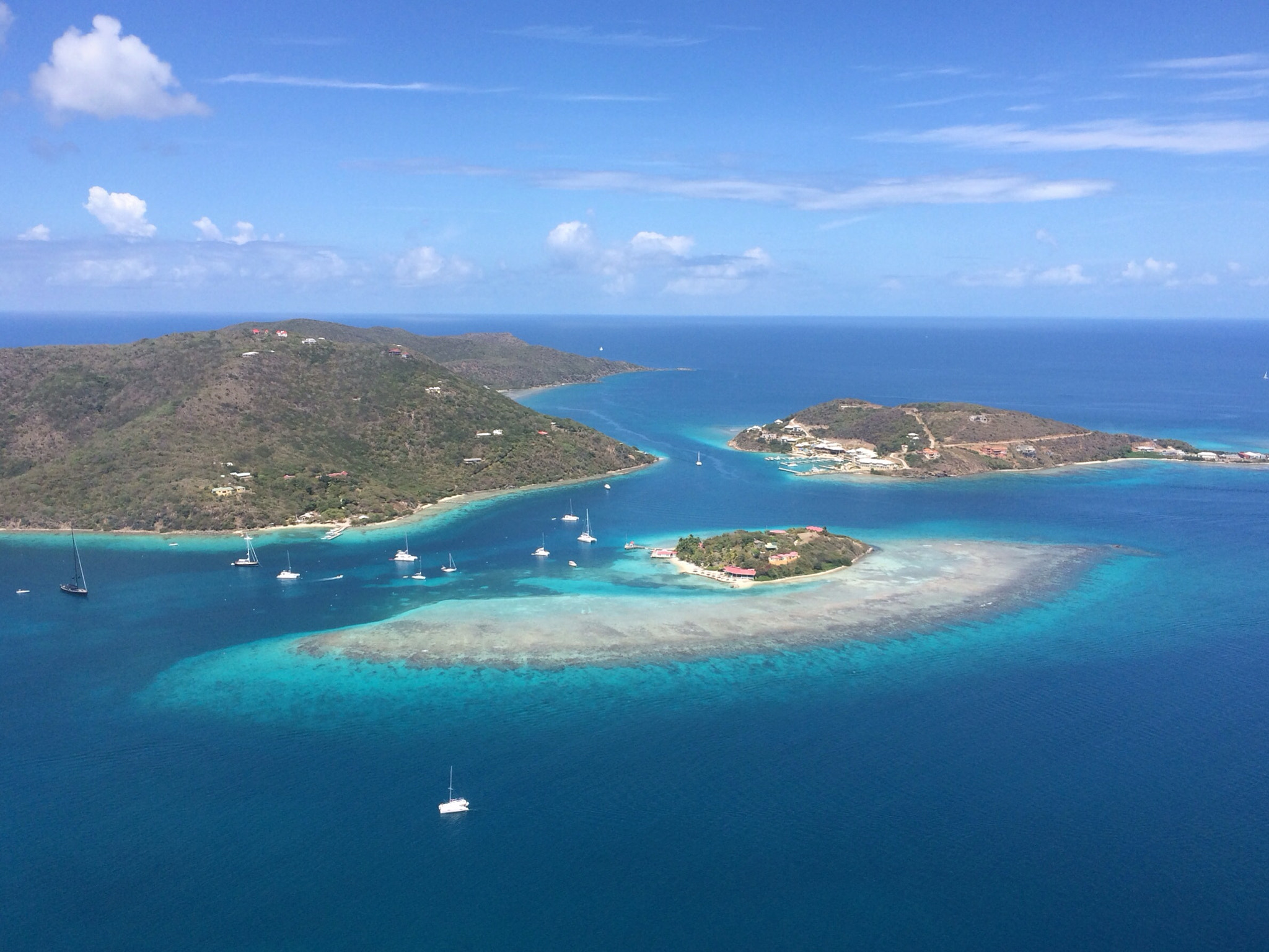
- Marina Cay is the smallest island, in the center

- The location of Marina Cay within the British Virgin Islands

- Location within British Virgin Islands Location within the Caribbean

Geography
- Location: Caribbean Sea
- Coordinates: 18°27′39.7″N 64°31′30.93″W
- Archipelago: Virgin Islands
- Area: 0.013 sq mi (0.034 km^{2})

Administration
- United Kingdom
- British Overseas Territory: British Virgin Islands

Additional information
- Time zone: AST (UTC-4)
- ISO code: VG

Marina Cay is an island of the British Virgin Islands in the Caribbean.

The 8-acre (3.2 ha) island was uninhabited until 1937, when author Robb White and newly married wife Rosalie “Rodie” Mason settled on the island. Originally having settled on the nearby island of Tortola, White had found the insect problem to be unbearable, and spent weeks sailing during the day searching for a new island home.

The Whites spent three years on Marina, hacking a cistern out of the rough, rocky land and shipping in enough concrete to build a small, sturdy house. These adventurous years – during which the couple weathered a hurricane, fended off a Nazi skipper, aided Jewish refugees, and survived a surprise visit from White's mother-in-law – are detailed in his memoirs In Privateer’s Bay (1939), Our Virgin Island (1953), and Two on the Isle (1985).

White was recalled to military duty when World War II broke out. At the same time, he and Rodie lost Marina Cay; the British government had never issued them a license to hold the land and now formally refused, stating that White's published writings had misrepresented conditions in the British Virgin Islands.

Eugene Tonkonogy took ownership of the island after he persuaded the British colonial governor to grant him a license. He used the island as a private retreat and also operated it as a tourist resort. Tonkonogy died in 2001.

In the early 2000s Jose Cuervo Tequila leased the island, referring to it as Cuervo Nation. The island was used as a promotional tool, hosting promotional events at the island, and using it as a location to host contest winners. Cuervo Nation and Cuervo Man were featured a John Hodgman-narrated segment of This American Life, episode 205 "Plan B". Cuervo Nation and the aforementioned This American Life segment are referenced in Burn Down the Ground: A Memoir by Kambri Crews, who served as a brand ambassador for Jose Cuervo and was on the island when she got news of her father's arrest for attempted murder.

Before Hurricane Irma, Marina Cay was home to Pusser's Restaurant and Villa Rentals; the house Robb and Rodie built served as a reading lounge for the modest tourist complex.

It was totally destroyed by hurricane Irma in 2017.

Today there is just a fuel station and a wooden pier for taxi boats.
