= Robert W. Hebberd =

American social reformer (1857–1928)

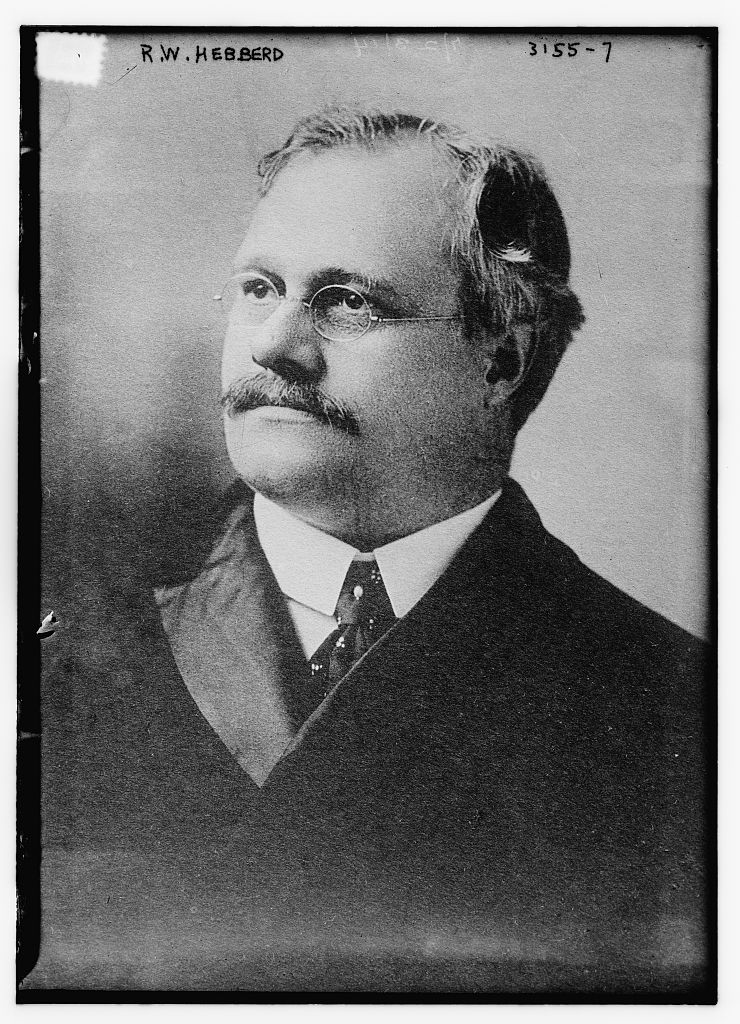
Hebberd, c. 1910–1915

Robert W. Hebberd (October 31, 1857 - November 25, 1928) was the Executive Secerty of the New York State Board of Charities and superintendent of the Queensboro Society for the Prevention of Cruelty to Children. He aided in the formation of Coney Island Hospital.

== Biography ==
He was born on October 31, 1857, to Gilbert Oliver Hebberd and Isabella Lenox. On November 29, 1882, in Seneca Falls, New York, he married Harriet Metcalf. He died on November 25, 1928, at Jamaica Hospital of heart disease.
