= Delacorte Theater =

Theater in New York City's Central Park

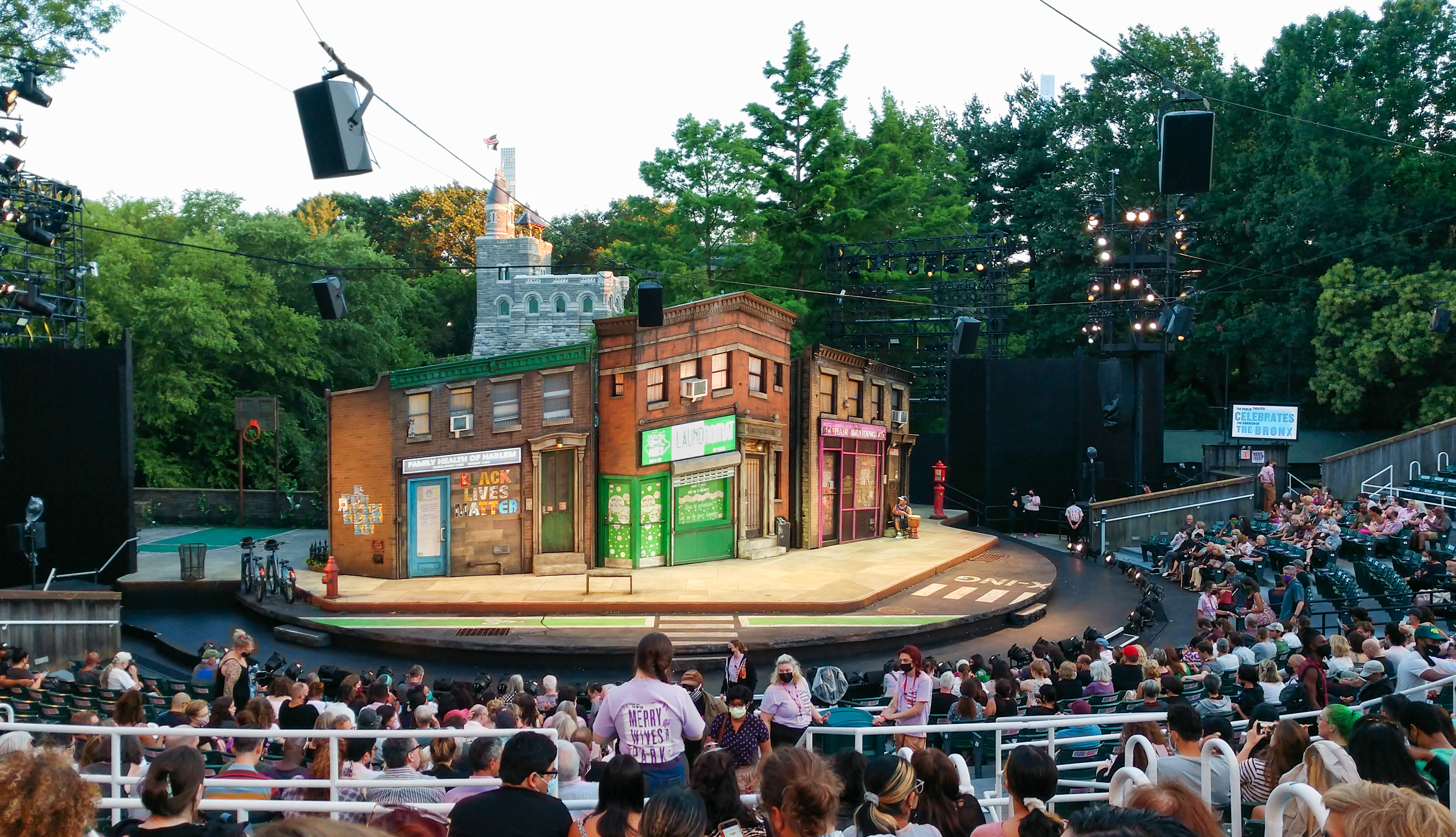
- The theater in 2021
- Interactive map of Delacorte Theater
- Address: Central Park; Manhattan, New York; United States
- Coordinates: 40°46′48.36″N 73°58′7.56″W
- Owner: City of New York
- Operator: Public Theater
- Capacity: 1,800
- Public transit: 81st Street–Museum of Natural History station, 77th Street station

Construction
- Opened: June 18, 1962

Tenant
- Shakespeare in the Park

The Delacorte Theater is a 1,800-seat open-air amphitheater in Central Park, in the New York City borough of Manhattan. It is home to the Public Theater's free Shakespeare in the Park productions.

Over five million people have attended more than 150 free productions of Shakespeare and other classical works and musicals at the Delacorte Theater since its opening in 1962. The theater was closed for renovation between 2023 and 2025.

== History ==
=== 1958–1962: Development ===
Joseph Papp ran a Shakespeare festival starting in 1954. Papp's group had been touring New York's boroughs on temporary staging, including presenting at Central Park. Papp's group was well-regarded, and he started seeking funds in 1958 for a permanent outdoor amphitheater in Central Park, with the aid of Helen Hayes. Parks Commissioner Robert Moses was opposed to the project. However, Moses was replaced by Newbold Morris in 1960, who was much more positive toward the creation of a theater.

The city government decided to go forward with the project, and the Board of Estimate approved $250,000 in funds for construction, with Park Department architects designing the original theater. The theater had been planned to open in 1961. However, the funds ran dry with the theater unfinished. Morris talked with his friend George T. Delacorte Jr., president of the Dell Publishing company. Delacorte, a fan of Shakespeare, agreed to fund the remaining $150,000 to finish construction of the theater, which was named in honor of him and his wife Valerie in gratitude. The theater was built on the site of an old Croton Aqueduct reservoir.

Delays from changes in design, a construction strike, as well as procuring the required funds from Delacorte pushed the opening back to 1962. The first production at the theater was in June 1962 with The Merchant of Venice, starring George C. Scott and James Earl Jones. The theater originally had 2,300 seats; at some point, the number of seats was reduced to make the experience less overcrowded for the audience.

=== Festival Latino (1976–1991) ===
Festival Latino (1976–1991), "the largest festival of Hispanic culture in the history of North America", was run by Oscar Ciccione and Cecilia Vega, producing Spanish-language shows every August at the Delacorte Theater.

=== 21st century ===
In 2012 the Public celebrated the 50th anniversary of the Delacorte with a gala and a one-night only reading of Romeo and Juliet starring numerous past performers. Meryl Streep and Kevin Kline read the lead roles. By the 2010s, the theater was in poor shape. The bleachers were leaky and crowded, while the backstage areas were covered only by tarps. Some actors refused to perform at the Delacorte due to the bad conditions there.

==== 2023–2025 renovation ====
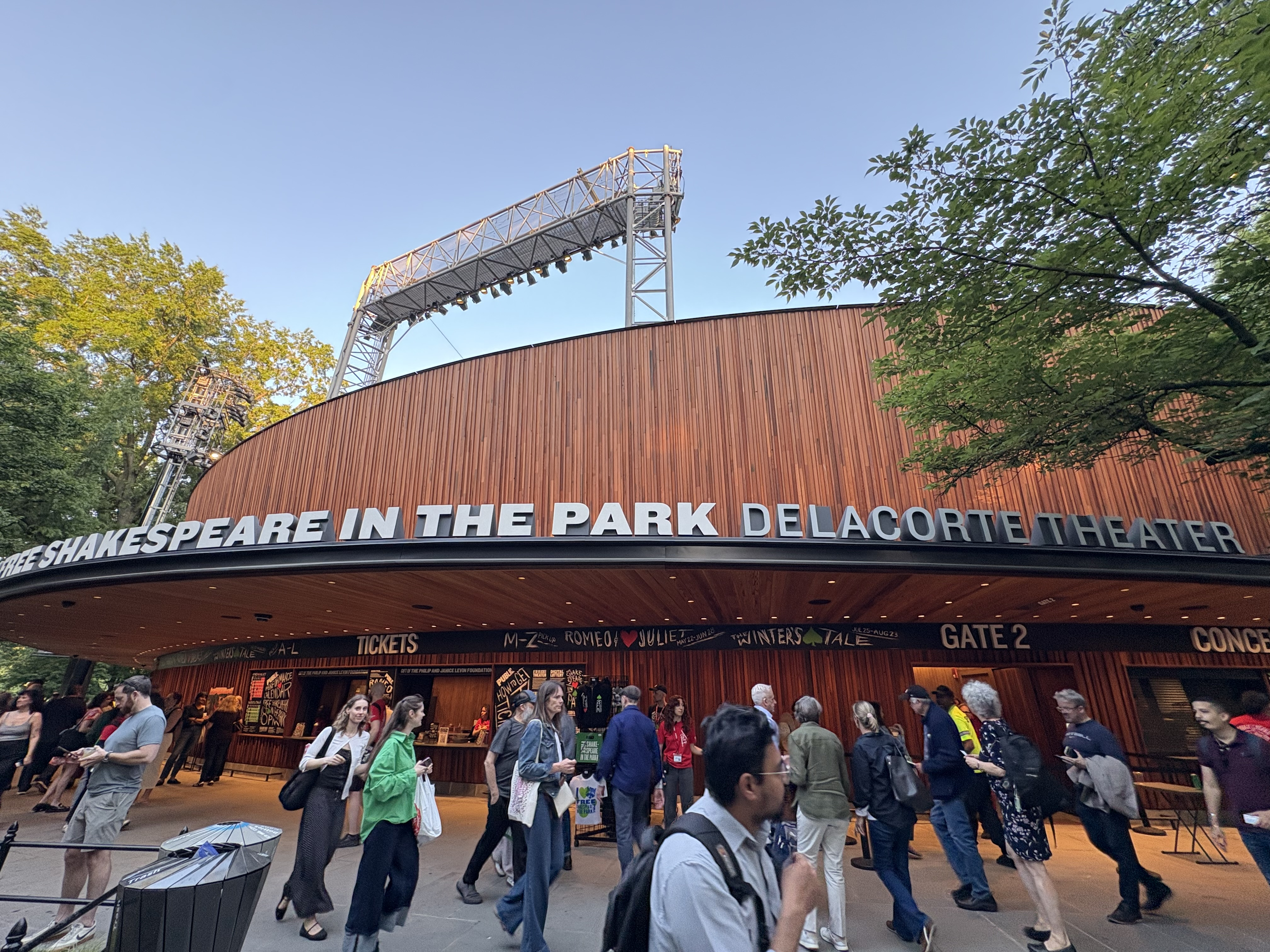
Exterior of the Delacorte in June 2026

In 2018, the Public announced plans for the first major renovation of the Delacorte. They cited several goals for the renovation: better accessibility for disabled patrons and performers, improved backstage flow and operations, a new facade, replacement of the stage floor due to exposure and weather damage to the original deck, and better lighting. Bjarke Ingels was originally hired to redesign the theater, which was intended to cost $110 million. Due to the COVID-19 pandemic, the Public indicated that it did not want to spend as much money on the renovation. As such, the Public hired Ennead Architects, which had previously redesigned the Astor Library Building, to renovate the Delacorte. The New York City Landmarks Preservation Commission approved the plans in January 2022.

The Delacorte closed for renovation in September 2023 after the final show of the summer 2023 season, a musical version of The Tempest, closed. The renovation was expected to take around 18 months, with the theater planned to reopen in time for the summer 2025 season. As part of the renovation, the theater was rebuilt with wood recycled from water towers atop apartment buildings in New York City. The theater was rebuilt in a conical shape, and the backstage facilities were also refurbished to accommodate a higher number of performances. The renovated theater reopened on July 15, 2025, having cost $85 million to rebuild.

== Productions ==
Since the opening of the theatre in 1962, the Public Theatre has had typically presented two or three productions each summer at the Delacorte. While most have been productions of Shakespeare's plays, either in full or abridged, some have been musical adaptations of Shakespeare's works, and some have been other classic works.

== Ticketing ==
With the exception of pre-reserved tickets for donors to the Public or friends of the production, all tickets for shows at the Delacorte are distributed the day of a performance. Traditionally, tickets are distributed at the Delacorte Theater's box office beginning at noon and until they are sold out, with audiences lining up as soon as if not before Central Park opens at 6:00 AM. All performances also have a standby line, where any tickets that were canceled, returned, or not picked up before 7:30PM are distributed. Audiences are allotted two tickets per person.

Beginning in 2007, the Public offers alternate methods of gaining tickets to productions at the Delacorte. On the day of performances the theater distributes ticket vouchers at a designated location in one of the five boroughs beginning at noon. Vouchers are also distributed at the Public's in-person lottery, held downtown at their 425 Lafayette Street location at noon. A digital lottery, currently managed by TodayTix, is also drawn at noon. Recipients of vouchers and/or winners of the lotteries can exchange or pick up their tickets at the Delacorte box office between 5:30 and 7:30PM, prior to the performance.
