= George T. Delacorte Jr. =

American publisher

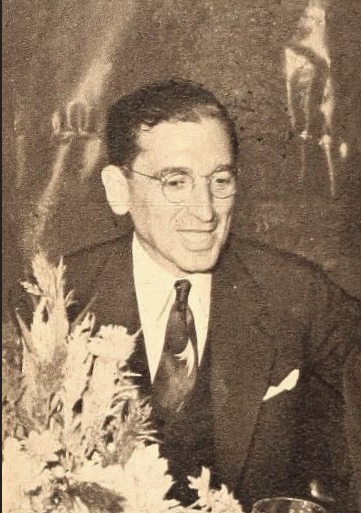
- Delacorte Jr. in 1946
- Born: George Tonkonogy; 20 June 1894; New York City, New York, U.S.
- Died: 4 May 1991 (aged 96); Manhattan, New York City, New York, U.S.
- Education: Columbia University
- Occupation: Magazine publisher

George T. Delacorte Jr. (20 June 1894 – 4 May 1991) was an American magazine publisher, born in New York City.

He founded the Dell Publishing in 1921. His goal was to entertain readers who were not satisfied with the genteel publications available at the time. The company was one of the largest publishers of books, magazines, and comics during its heyday. His most successful innovation was the puzzle magazine. Doubleday acquired Dell Publishing in 1976.

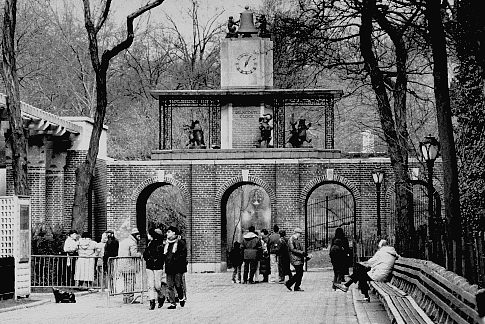
Delacorte Clock located in the Central Park Zoo.

== Biography ==
Delacorte, born George Tonkonogy, was the son of George Tonkonogy, Sr. and Sadie König, both Jewish immigrants from Eastern Europe. He grew up in Brooklyn with his siblings; Abraham, Mamie, Henrietta, Archibald, Elizabeth, Eugene, and Gertrude.

An alumnus of Columbia University (1913), Delacorte donated money to the university which established the Delacorte Professorship in the Humanities and helped found the George T. Delacorte Center for Magazine Journalism and the creation of the Delacorte Professorship in Magazine Journalism in 1984. The university recognized him with an honorary doctorate in 1982.

In 1962, he donated money to establish the Delacorte Theater in Central Park, New York City. He also donated money for the Delacorte Clock in the park, an Alice in Wonderland sculpture to the north of Conservatory Water with among others the Mad Hatter (whose face is supposedly modeled on that of Delacorte) in honor of his wife, and sculptures of The Tempest and Romeo and Juliet. He donated several fountains to the city, including ones located at the southern end of City Hall Park, Columbus Circle, Roosevelt Island, and Bowling Green. Among his contributions, he considered the Delacorte Fountain on Roosevelt Island to be his personal favorite.

He died in Manhattan in 1991 at the age of 96, survived by his second wife Valerie Delacorte (whose first husband was the Hungarian producer Gabriel Pascal), two sons, three daughters, 18 grandchildren and 19 great-grandchildren. His siblings included Gertrude Friedberg and Eugene Tonkonogy.

He is memorialized by several funds in The New York Community Trust, which offers a biographical brochure.

== See also ==
- Dell Comics
- Dell Magazines
