= NYC Bird Alliance =

US conservation organization

NYC Bird Alliance (formerly New York City Audubon Society) is an American non-profit environmental organization founded in 1979 and incorporated in 1980. The group protects wild birds and their habitats in New York City, through science research, political advocacy, and education events to teach people about birds. With nearly 10,000 members, it is one of the largest affiliated chapters of the National Audubon Society.

In recent years, it has exercised particular influence in several areas: the restoration of the red-tailed hawk Pale Male's nest, work to reduce bird collisions with buildings including studying the fatal effects of light pollution and glass windows on migratory birds, encouraging installation of green roofs on city buildings, and protecting water birds.

== Naming ==
NYC Bird Alliance was originally named in honor of John James Audubon, an ornithologist and naturalist who shot, painted, catalogued, and described the Birds of North America. Audubon was a slave owner and anti-abolitionist, and while the National Audubon Society decided to retain the name, multiple local organizations have opted to change it. In June 2024, New York City Audubon became the NYC Bird Alliance.

== Pale Male ==
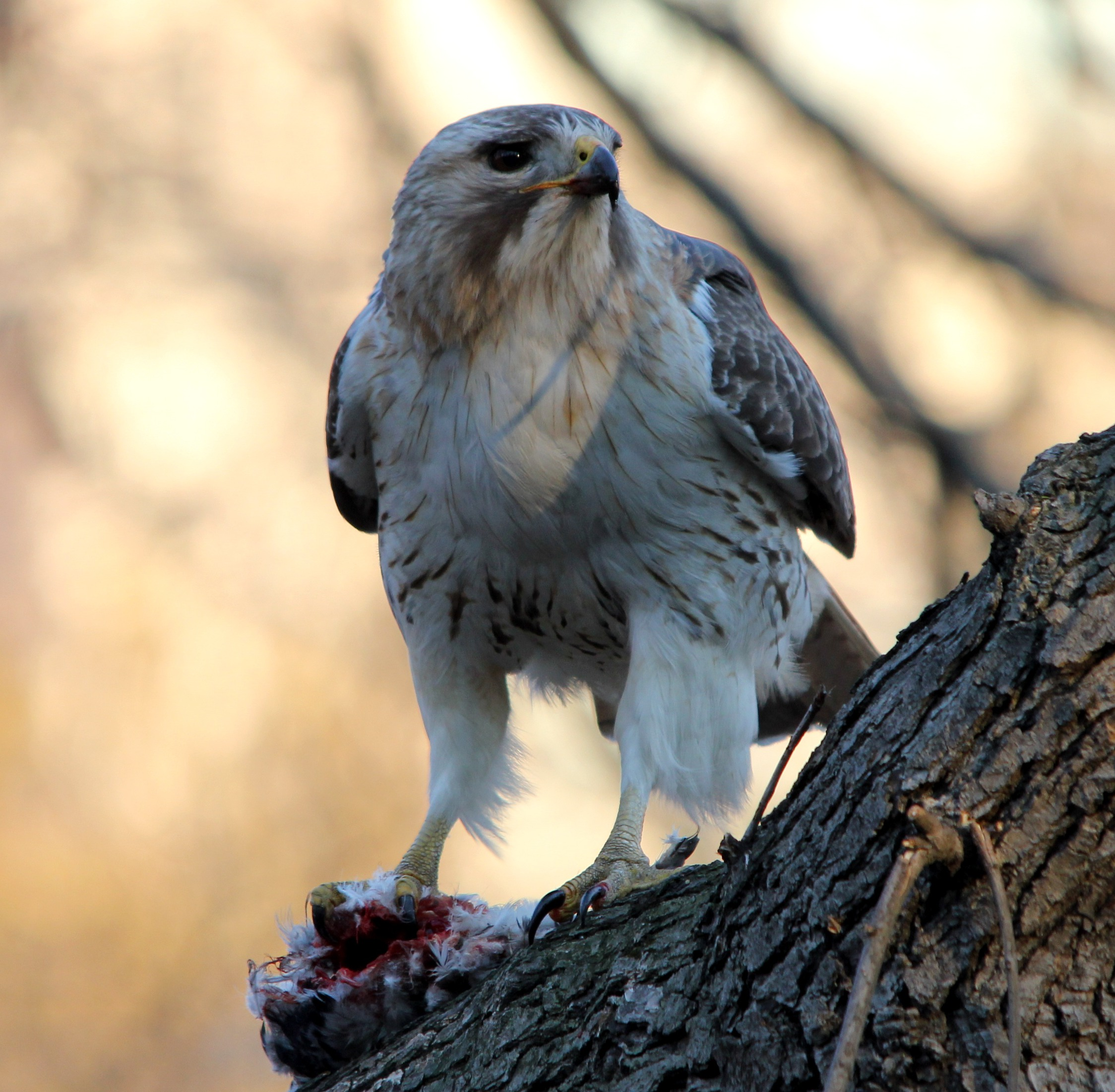
Red-tailed hawk known as Pale Male in New York City's Central Park.

NYC Bird Alliance organized the protests that followed the removal of the hawk Pale Male's nest in December 2004 and played a major role in negotiating a solution with the co-op board of 927 Fifth Avenue. Although Pale Male and his mate, Lola, continued to nest at the site, no new chicks fledged in subsequent years. In 2008, it recruited experts from around the country to assess the problem, and removed pigeon spikes from the nest structure as a result of their recommendations. In 2011, Pale Male, with a new mate, successfully fledged two chicks, suggesting that fertility issues were the likely cause of the nest failure from 2005 to 2010.

== Reducing Bird Collisions with Buildings: Project Safe Flight ==
Each year, more than a billion birds are killed in North America in bird-window collisions. In 1997 NYC Bird Alliance launched Project Safe Flight, modeled after Toronto's Fatal Light Awareness Program (FLAP), to work toward long-term solutions for the bird collision problem. From the program's inception through 2013, field volunteers have found more than 6,000 dead or injured birds of more than 100 species. The most frequently harmed species include white-throated sparrows, common yellowthroats, and ovenbirds. Project Safe Flight works with building owners and managers to address site-specific threats to migratory birds and is working with politicians, architects, glass manufacturers and others to seek long-term solutions. Prior to 9/11, World Trade Center management, at the organization's request, placed protective netting around the lower floors of 1 WTC and 2 WTC. The netting acted somewhat like a trampoline—instead of striking the glass, the birds just bounced off, unharmed.

In September 2006, Project Safe Flight began a comprehensive study aimed at quantifying the magnitude of the bird collision problem in New York City as well as identifying the main factors involved in such collisions. Dr. Daniel Klem of Muhlenberg College, an international authority on the bird collision topic, is leading the study. The project, funded by a grant from US Fish and Wildlife Service with matching funds from corporations and individuals, relies on local citizen scientists for data collection.

Each season, over 150 volunteers are involved in the monitoring effort spanning 51 buildings in all 5 boroughs. Volunteers often wake up before sunrise to monitor their assigned routes for collision victims, bringing injured birds to the Wild Bird Fund for rehabilitation and deceased birds to the NYC Bird Alliance headquarters for further research. In the Fall 2024 season, volunteers recorded 1,012 migratory bird-window collision data points. Data collected during collision monitoring is entered into the internal NYC Bird Alliance database for research while people are encouraged to enter off-duty sightings into the crowd-sourced database DBird.org.

=== Lights Out New York ===
Light pollution contributes to bird collisions. In 2005 New York City Mayor Michael Bloomberg's administration endorsed a voluntary NYC Bird Alliance program that encourages tall buildings to turn out external lights between midnight and 6 a.m. and shield interior lights as well. The Chrysler Building, Bank of America Tower, and New York Times Building are among the nearly 100 buildings participating in the program.

== Harbor Herons Project ==
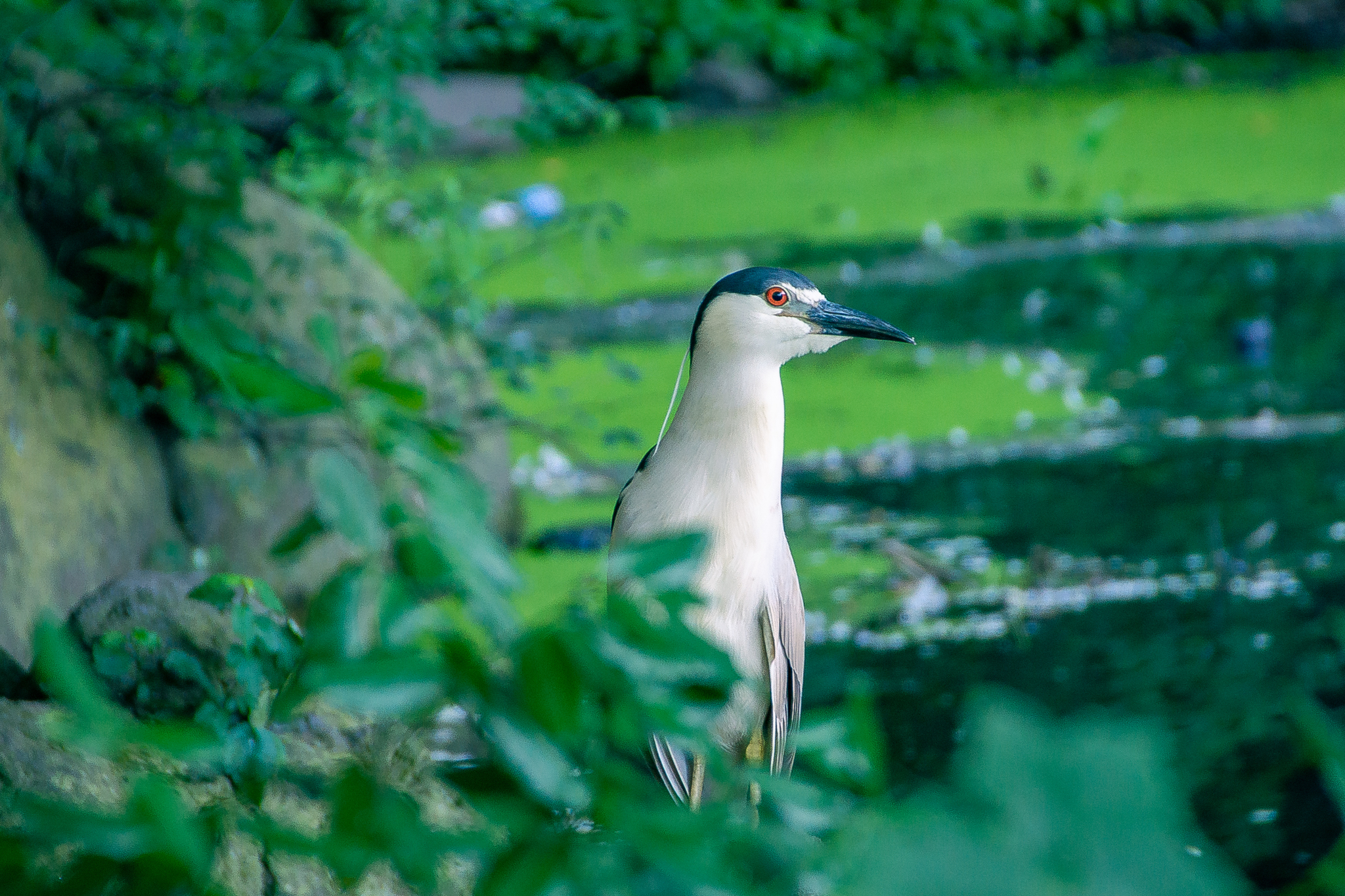
Black-crowned night heron (Nycticorax nycticorax) in New York City

The small islands of the highly commercialized and heavily developed New York/New Jersey Estuary are home to one of the Atlantic Coast's largest colonies of nesting herons – with more than 3,000 individuals. Since 1985, NYC Bird Alliance has managed the nesting sites.

== See also ==
- Geography and environment of New York City
- Environmental issues in New York City
- Jamaica Bay
- Central Park
- Prospect Park
- Pelham Bay Park
- Forest Park
- Staten Island Greenbelt
