= Conservatory Water =

Pond in New York City's Central Park

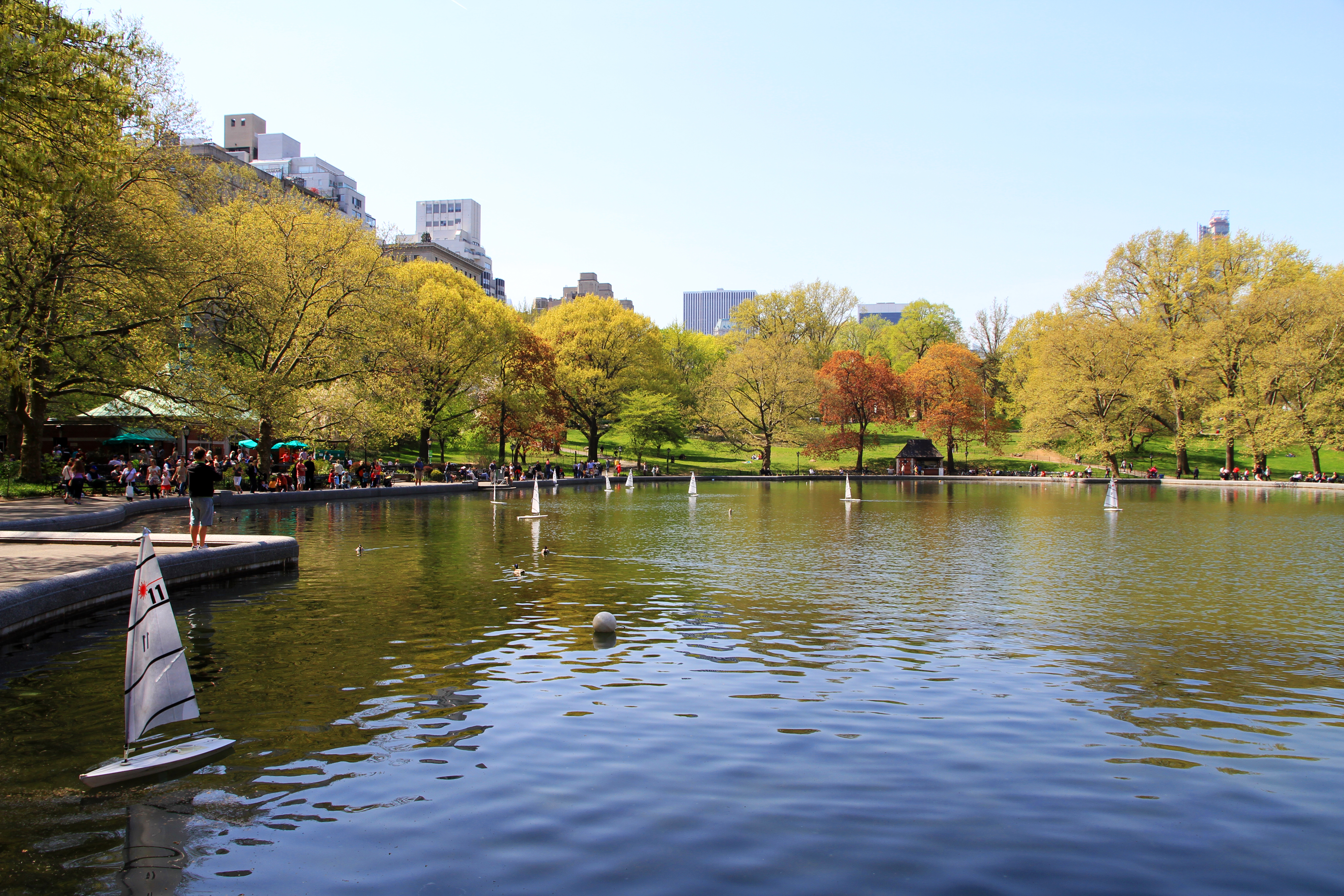
- Conservatory Water, facing south

- Location within Manhattan Location within New York City Location within New York Location within the United States
- Location: Central Park, Manhattan, New York City, New York, USA
- Coordinates: 40°46′27″N 73°58′03″W
- Type: pond
- Website: centralpark.com/conservatory-water

Notable buildings and structures of Central Park. Click on the map and then on the points for details.

Conservatory Water is a pond located in a natural hollow within Central Park in Manhattan, New York City. It is located west of Fifth Avenue, centered opposite East 74th Street. The pond is surrounded by several landscaped hills, including Pilgrim Hill dotted by groves of Yoshino cherry trees and Pug Hill. These plantings were intended to match the flora around the mansions that once lined the adjacent stretch of Fifth Avenue.

Conservatory Water is named for a glass-house for tropical plants and was intended to be entered from Fifth Avenue by a grand stair. The shore of Conservatory Water contains the Kerbs Memorial Boathouse, where patrons can rent and navigate radio-controlled model boats, as well as bronze sculptures.

The water was supplied from the Ramble and Lake, the site of the historic Sawkill stream, which once flowed through here on its way to the East River. When Central Park was built in the mid-19th century, hardy water lilies were naturalized in the bottom mud and tender ones were wintered over in the park's conservatory. Later, the naturalistic water lily pond was reshaped as a model boat pond.

== History ==
Conservatory Water is named for another estate-garden feature, a glass-house for tropical plants, to be entered from Fifth Avenue by a grand stair. The garden had been proposed in the Greensward Plan of 1857, during a design competition for Central Park where the Greensward Plan ultimately won out. Several other proposals submitted during the competition did not include a formal garden. The two principal designers of the Greensward Plan, Frederick Law Olmsted and Calvert Vaux, instead suggested building a conservatory on the site of the proposed formal garden, with a "hard-edged" reflecting pool in the middle. Only the reflecting pool was constructed, though.

A naturalistic pond displaying water lilies was excavated. The steep bank towards Fifth Avenue was densely planted with shrubs and trees, including birch—for quick cover—and copper beech. Samuel Parsons, Calvert Vaux's assistant and partner, who was named Superintendent of Plantings, described the effect in his Landscape Gardening (1891):

The general shape of this pond was oval, with winding, irregular shores, bounded by a high bank on the east side and a great willow drooping over the north end. Rocks were disposed in the immediate banks, so as to suggest a natural formation, rather than an artificial pond. The bottom, scarcely three feet deep, was cemented tight as a cup, and the water flowed gently in at one end, and out at the other, and so through a basin and into the sewer. Eighteen inches of soil was made rich with manure and deposited over the bottom.

The water was supplied from the Ramble and Lake, the site of the historic Sawkill stream, which once flowed through here on its way to the East River. Hardy water lilies, both European and American, were naturalized in the bottom mud and tender ones, planted in boxes, were wintered over in the park's conservatory, now the site of Conservatory Garden.

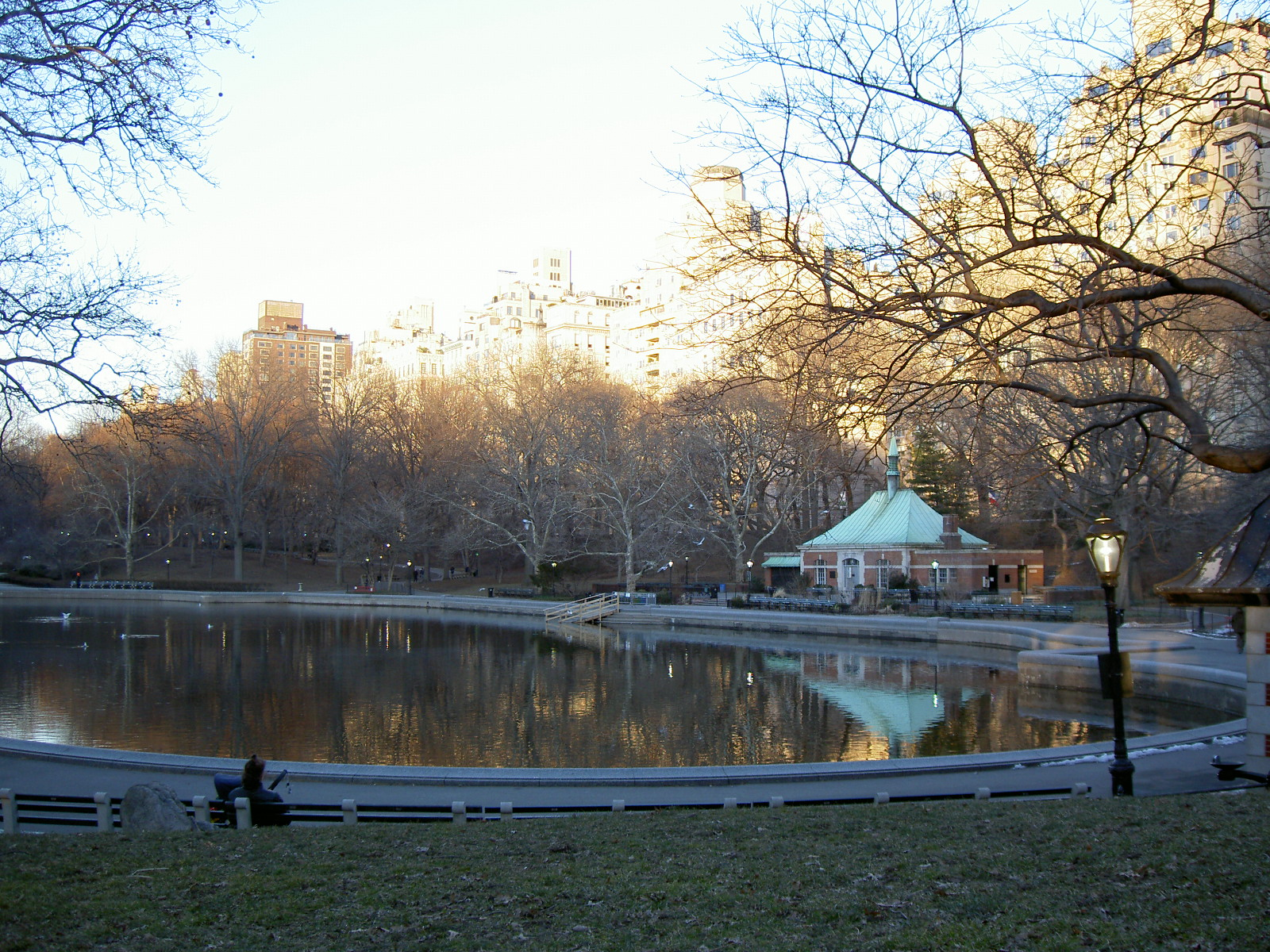
Conservatory Water during a winter sunset, facing east

Since the 1860s, children had sailed their model yachts at the pond. Later, the naturalistic water lily pond was reshaped as a model boat pond loosely based on that of one in the Jardin du Luxembourg, in Paris.

The formally shaped shallow basin is set in a molded curb of "Atlantic Blue" granite, which replaced a concrete curb in 2000. It is home water to a flotilla of model sailboats. The model sailboats were made familiar in the pages of E.B. White's children's realistic fantasy novel Stuart Little (1945) about a mouse-like human boy who sailed his ship on Conservatory Water. The novel was recreated in the popular family animated/live-action comedy 1999 film of the same name. Model boat rentals were unavailable from 2020 to 2023 due to the COVID-19 pandemic. In 2026, the Central Park Conservancy announced that Conservancy Water would be closed for repairs during the 2027 season. The restoration would include draining the pond and renovating the Kerbs Boathouse. The pond was to be drained in 2026, and the boathouse was to be closed for renovations the next year; both projects were planned to be completed in 2028.

== Boathouse ==
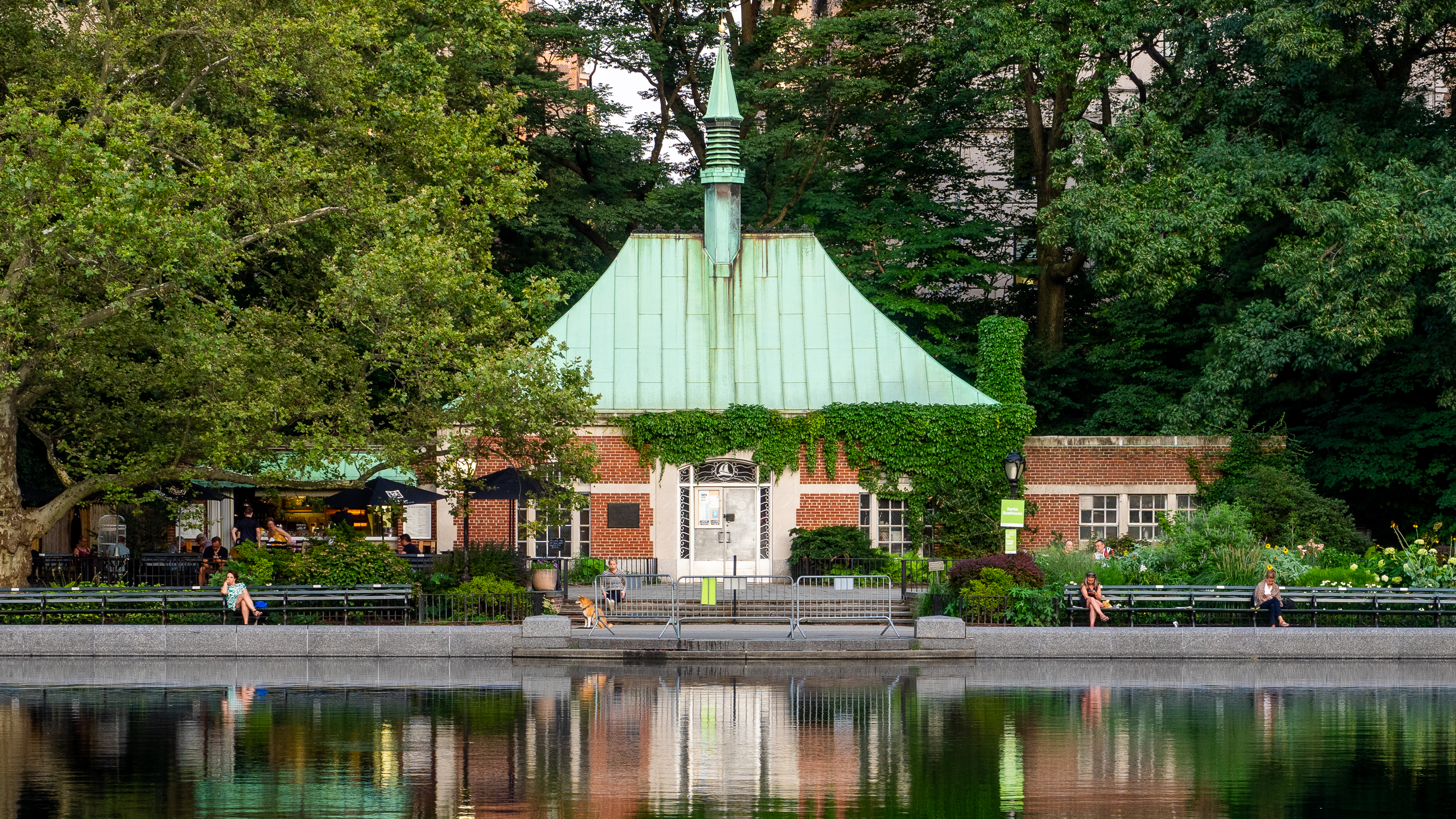
The Kerbs Memorial Boathouse

The eastern shore of Conservatory Water contains the Kerbs Memorial Boathouse, designed by architect Aymar Embury II, where patrons can rent and navigate radio-controlled and wind-powered model boats. The 1954 boathouse, in picnic Georgian taste with red brick and a green copper hip roof and steeple, outside of which is a flagstone patio, houses resident model sailboats as well as the radio-controlled model yachts of the Central Park Model Yacht Club.

== Surroundings ==
The waters of Conservatory Water shelter a seasonal population of unusual minute freshwater jellyfish, Craspedacusta sowerbyi. In the sculptured Beaux-Arts pediment of an upper-floor window of 927 Fifth Avenue, overlooking Conservatory Water, the red-tailed hawk named "Pale Male" set up a nest, under the binocular watch of the Park's numerous bird-watchers.

=== Pilgrim Hill ===
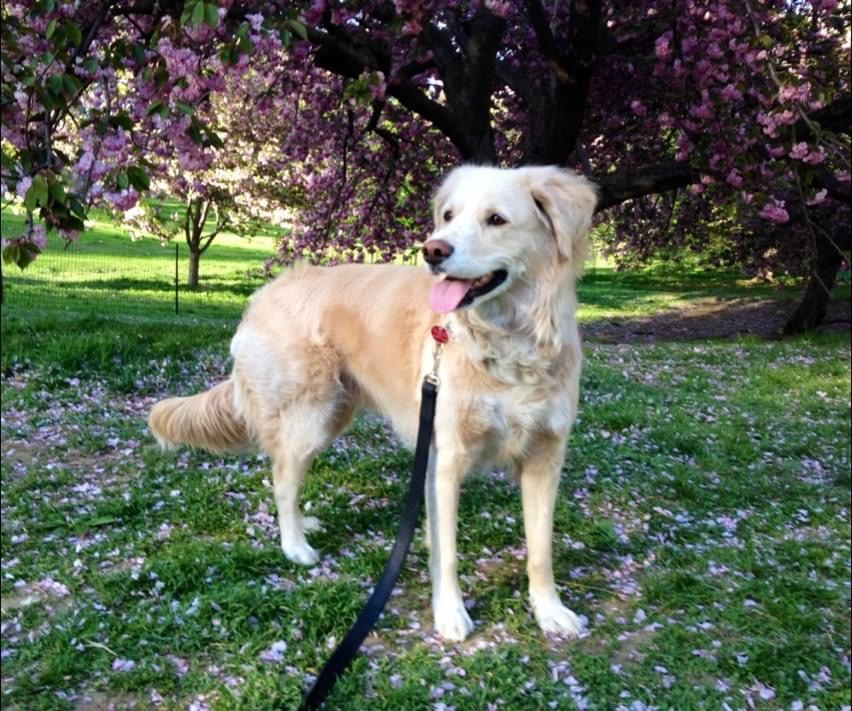
Flowering Yoshino cherry trees on Pilgrim Hill

Pilgrim Hill lies to the southwest of Conservatory Water, just inside the park entrance at 5th Avenue and on the north side of 72nd Street. Its slopes are popular among locals for sledding in the winter when Central Park receives 6 inches of snow, for groves of pale flowering Yoshino cherry trees as they burst into bloom in the spring, and for picnics and lounging in warmer months. The slopes are dotted by Prunus serrulata and other specimen trees, notably a globose European Hornbeam and nine species of oak, all set in rolling lawn.

They are surveyed by artist John Quincy Adams Ward's bronze statue of The Pilgrim, a 9 feet (2.7 m) tall stylized representation of one of the Pilgrims, British immigrants to the New World led by William Bradford who left from Plymouth, England, in the cargo ship Mayflower in September 1620. The statue faces westward on the crest of a little knoll at the top of the hill, on a rusticated Quincy granite pedestal that was created by architect Richard Morris Hunt and contains four bas-reliefs (depicting the ship the Mayflower, Bible and Sword, Cross-Bow and Arrows, and Commerce), overlooking the East Drive at East 72nd Street. The statue was donated to New York City in 1885 by the New England Society of New York.

=== Pug Hill ===
Pug Hill is located to the northwest of the Alice and Wonderland statue and was a popular place for the city's pug owners to socialize in the late 1990s through the mid-2000s. At times, there were so many pugs present that they were described as a fawn and black whirlpool moving through the grass. However, Pug Hill gatherings were ended due to heavy NYC Parks enforcement. In 2006, Pug Hill was the inspiration for an eponymous book.

=== Alice in Wonderland sculpture ===
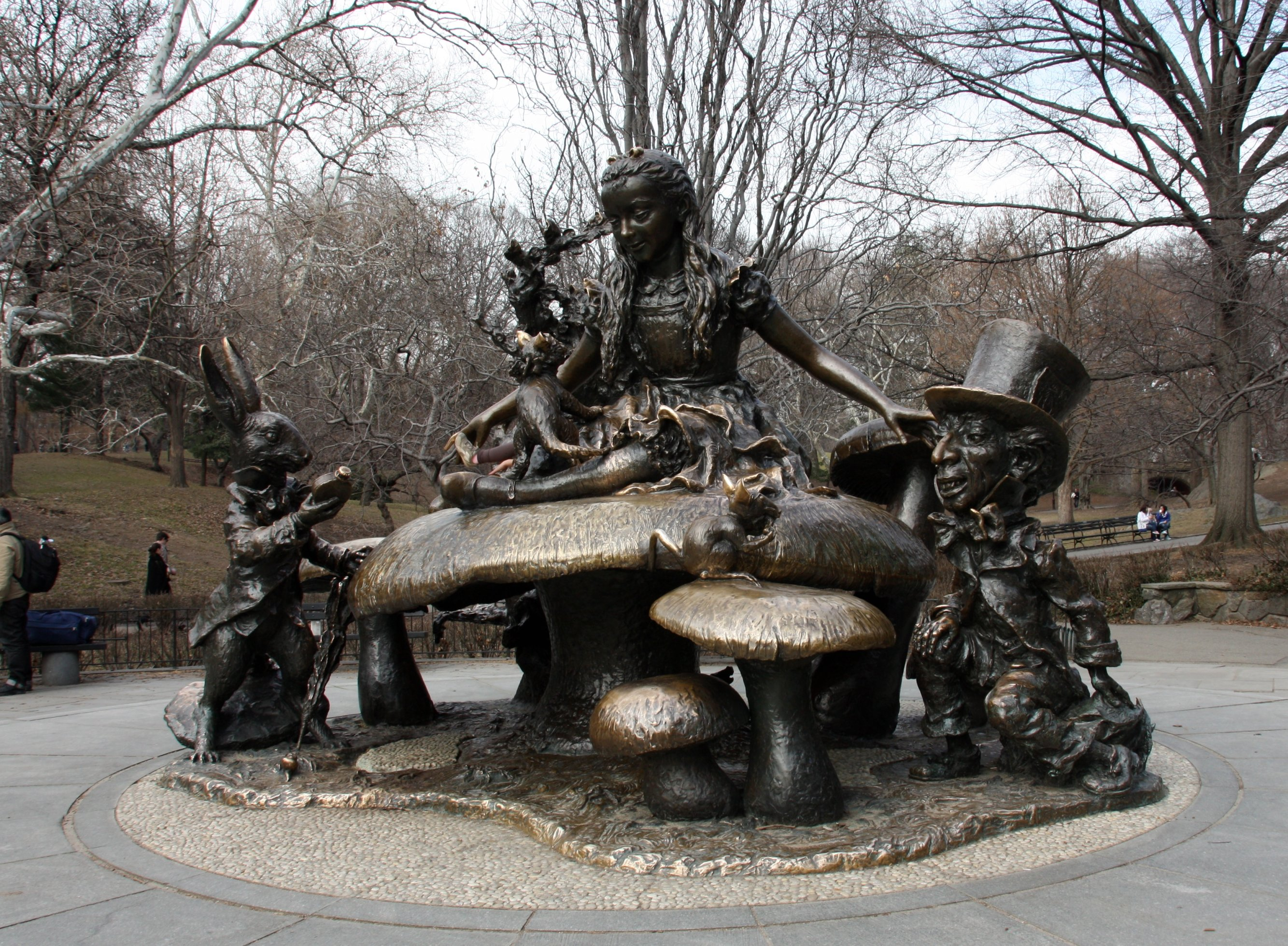
Alice in Wonderland by Jose de Creeft, 1959

Bronze sculptural groups set in small terraces front the Conservatory Water. One to the north, parallel with East 74th Street, commemorates Lewis Carroll's 1865 novel Alice in Wonderland, with an 11 feet (3.4 m) tall Alice (whose face is modeled on that of the sculptor's daughter) sitting on a large mushroom at a tea party held by the Mad Hatter (whose face is supposedly modeled on that of George Delacorte) with the March Hare, the White Rabbit, the Dormouse, the Cheshire Cat, the Caterpillar, and Alice's kitten Dinah in her lap. It was created in 1959 by sculptor José de Creeft, patterned on illustrations drawn by John Tenniel, commissioned by philanthropist George Delacorte in honor of his wife, and forged in the Modern Art Foundry in Queens, New York. It is favored by children who enjoy climbing on it, which was contemplated in its design. At the base of the statue, among other inscriptions, is a line from Lewis Carroll's 1871 nonsense poem "Jabberwocky".

=== Hans Christian Andersen sculpture ===
Another sculptural group, to the west of the Conservatory Water, commemorates Danish fable author Hans Christian Andersen and the Ugly Duckling (1955), sculpted by Georg John Lober. A larger-than-life-size 9 feet 6 inches (2.90 m) Anderson sits on a Stony Creek polished pink granite bench with an open book on his lap, turned to the story of "The Ugly Duckling," with a 2 feet (0.61 m)-tall bronze duck at his feet. In the palm of Andersen's left hand, the sculptor inscribed: "In appreciation of the help and encouragement my wife Nellie has always given me affectionately, Georg, 1956." The statue is meant to be climbed on. The sculpture was cast in the Modern Art Foundry.

These sculptures were built by NYC Parks commissioner Robert Moses in the 1950s as part of the park's "Children's District". Another statue, that of the fictional Mary Poppins, was not constructed.

=== Waldo Hutchins bench ===
Discreetly sited overlooking Conservatory Water, just inside Central Park north-west of the park's East 72nd Street and Fifth Avenue entrance, and east of Pilgrim Hill, is a curved Concord white granite exedra (a design from ancient Greece and Rome) outdoor bench. It commemorates Waldo Hutchins (1822–1891), a member of the original Board of Commissioners for Central Park, New York City Park Commissioner (1857–1869 and 1887–1891), and a three-term Representative to the U.S. Congress (1879–1885).

The bench is almost 4 feet (1.2 m) tall by 27 feet (8.2 m) long, and weighs several tons. The cost of the bench was $15,000 ($350,000 in current dollar terms). Its architect was Eric Gugler, and in 1932 it was executed by the Piccirilli Brothers studio, the firm that carved the Lincoln Memorial in Washington, D.C.

The bench has a small sundial, a variation on a 3rd century BC Hellenistic period Berossus sundial, at its back designed by sculptor Albert Stewart. The sundial features a small Art Deco bronze gnomon sculpture of a female dancer trailed by a wind-blown gown and flowing scarves at its center. The gnomon sculpture was crafted by sculptor Paul Manship, who created the 18-foot (5.5 m)-tall bronze gilded Prometheus statue at Rockefeller Center.

Incised in the bench and paving three semicircular arced lines match the bench shelf’s shadow lines at 10:00 a.m., noon, and 2:00 p.m. at the vernal and autumnal equinoxes--though today daylight saving time has thrown the times off by one hour in the spring. There are two Latin inscriptions etched into the back of the bench: vivas oportet si vis tibi vivere ("One must live for another, if he wishes to live for himself"; a quotation of the Roman philosopher Seneca the Younger); and the sundial reads ne diruatur fuga temporum ("Let it not be destroyed by the passage of time"). If two people sit at opposite ends of the bench and speak softly into it, they can hear each other easily. On the backside to the west, Pilgrim Hill overlooks the bench and Conservatory Water.
