= Geography of New York City =

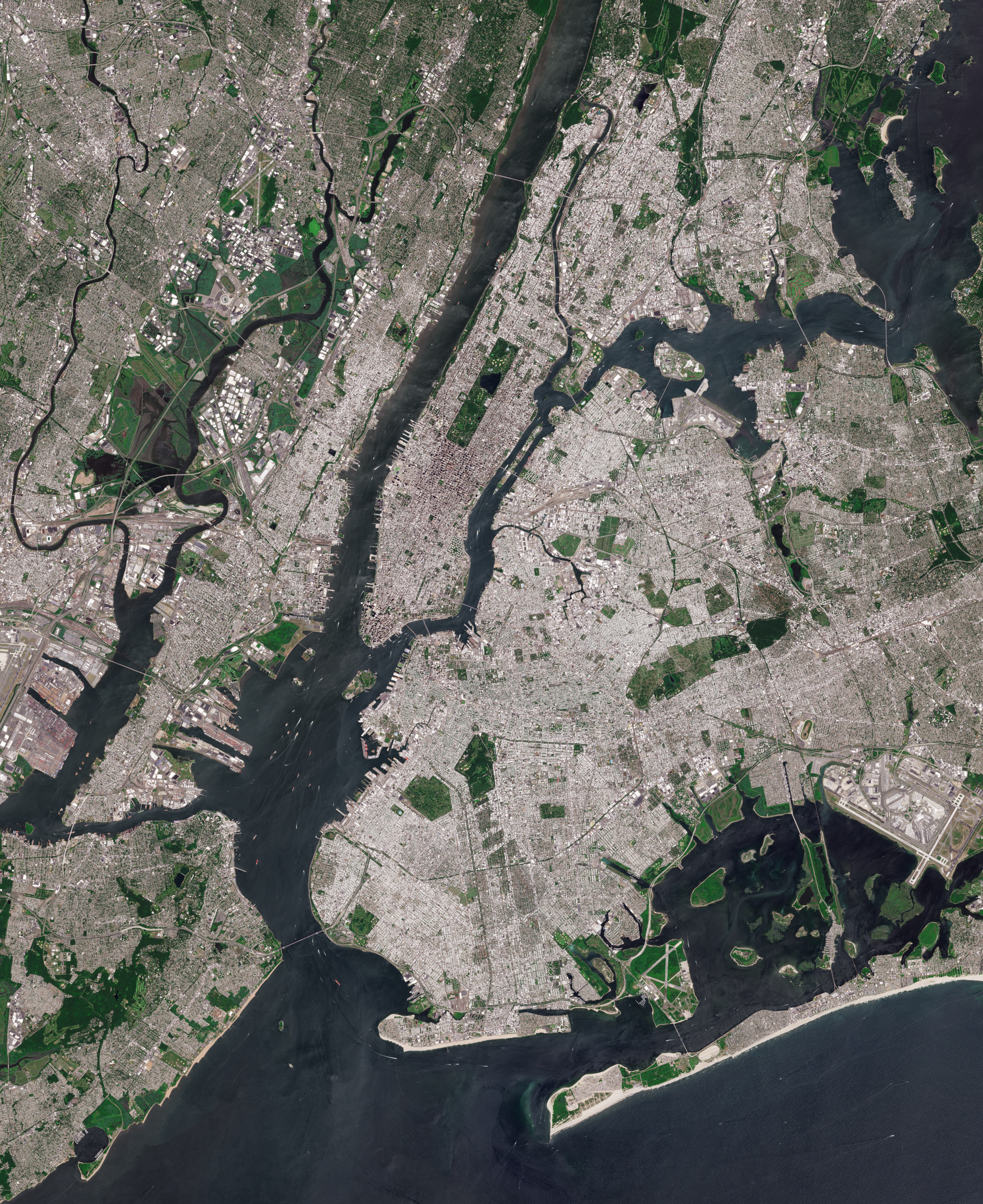
Satellite image showing most of the five boroughs, portions of eastern New Jersey, and the main waterways around New York Harbor

The geography of New York City is characterized by its coastal position at the meeting of the Hudson River and the Atlantic Ocean in a naturally sheltered harbor. The city's geography, with its scarce availability of land, is a contributing factor in making New York the most densely populated major city in the United States. Environmental issues are chiefly concerned with managing this density, which also explains why New York is among the most energy-efficient and least automobile-dependent cities in the United States. The city's climate is temperate.

== Geography ==
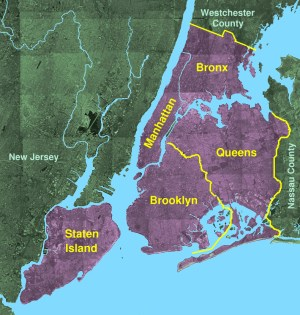
The five boroughs of New York City

New York City is located on the coast of the Northeastern United States at the mouth of the Hudson River in southeastern New York state. It is located in the New York–New Jersey Harbor Estuary, the centerpiece of which is the New York Harbor, whose deep waters and sheltered bays helped the city grow in significance as a trading city. Much of New York is built on the three islands of Manhattan, Staten Island, and western Long Island, making land scarce and encouraging a high population density.

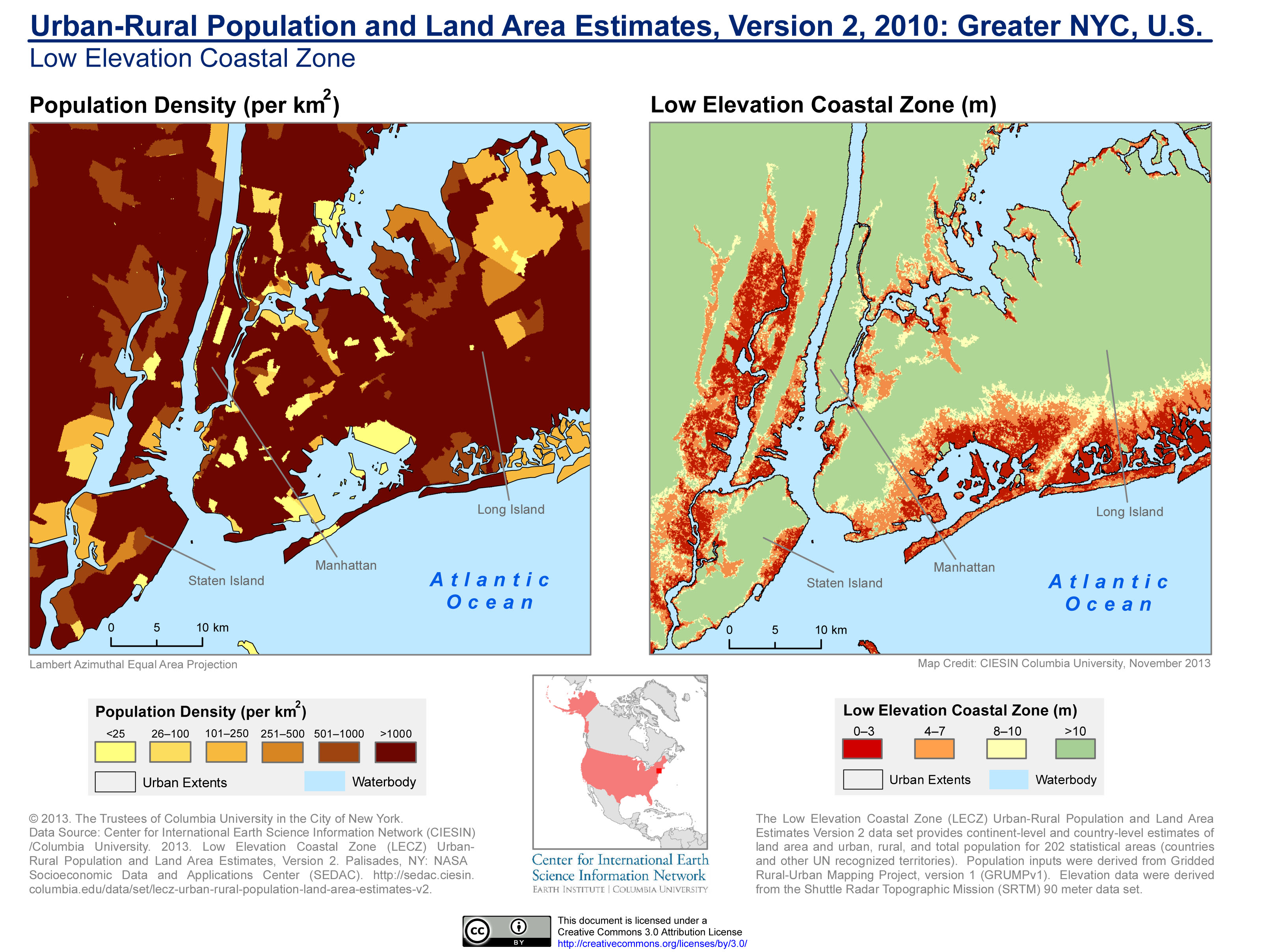
Population density and elevation above sea level in Greater NYC, U.S. (2010) New York City is especially vulnerable to sea level rise.

The Hudson River flows from the Hudson Valley into New York Bay, becoming a tidal estuary that separates the Bronx and Manhattan from Northern New Jersey. The Harlem River, another tidal strait between the East and Hudson Rivers, separates Manhattan from the Bronx.

The city's land has been altered considerably by human intervention, with substantial land reclamation along the waterfronts since Dutch colonial times. Reclamation is most notable in Lower Manhattan with modern developments like Battery Park City. Much of the natural variations in topography have been evened out, particularly in Manhattan. The West Side of Manhattan retains some hilliness, especially in Upper Manhattan, while the East Side has been considerably flattened. Duffy's Hill in East Harlem is one notable exception to the East Side's relatively level grade.

The city's land area is estimated to be 321 square miles (830 km^{2}). However, a more recent estimate calculates a total land area of 304.8 square miles (789.4 km^{2}). Icebergs are often compared in size to the area of Manhattan. New York City weighs about 1,680,000,000,000 pounds (7.6×10^{11} kg), this being the estimated cumulative mass of its buildings.

The highest natural point in the city is Todt Hill on Staten Island, which at 409.8 ft (124.9 m) above sea level is the highest hill on the Eastern Seaboard south of Maine. The summit of the ridge is largely covered in woodlands as part of the Staten Island Greenbelt. Many places have been identified as the geographic center of the city, including a plaque in the center of Queens Boulevard and 58th Street, in Woodside, Queens.

== Geology ==
The boroughs of New York City straddle the border between two geologic provinces of eastern North America. Brooklyn and Queens, located on Long Island, are part of the eastern coastal plain. Long Island is a massive moraine which formed at the southern fringe of the Laurentide Ice Sheet during the last ice age. The Bronx and Manhattan lie on the eastern edge of the Newark Basin, a block of the Earth's crust which sank downward during the disintegration of the supercontinent Pangaea during the Triassic period. The Palisades Sill on the New Jersey shore of the Hudson River exposes ancient, once-molten rock that filled the basin. The bedrock underlying much of Manhattan is a mica schist known as Manhattan schist of the Manhattan Prong physiographic region. It is a strong, competent metamorphic rock that was produced when Pangaea formed. It is well suited for the foundations of tall buildings. In Central Park, outcrops of Manhattan schist occur and Rat Rock is one rather large example.

Geologically, a predominant feature of the substrata of Manhattan is that the underlying bedrock base of the island rises considerably closer to the surface near Midtown Manhattan, dips down lower between 29th Street and Canal Street, then rises toward the surface again in Lower Manhattan. It has been widely believed that the depth to bedrock was the primary underlying reason for the clustering of skyscrapers in the Midtown and Financial District areas, and their absence over the intervening territory between these two areas. However, research has shown that economic factors played a bigger part in the locations of these skyscrapers.

According to the United States Geological Survey, an updated analysis of seismic hazard in July 2014 revealed a "slightly lower hazard for tall buildings" than previously assessed. Scientists estimated this lessened risk based upon a lower likelihood than previously thought of slow shaking near New York City, which would be more likely to cause damage to taller structures from an earthquake in the vicinity of the city.

== Adjacent counties ==
New York

- Westchester County
- Nassau County

New Jersey

- Monmouth County
- Middlesex County
- Union County
- Hudson County
- Bergen County

== Boroughs ==
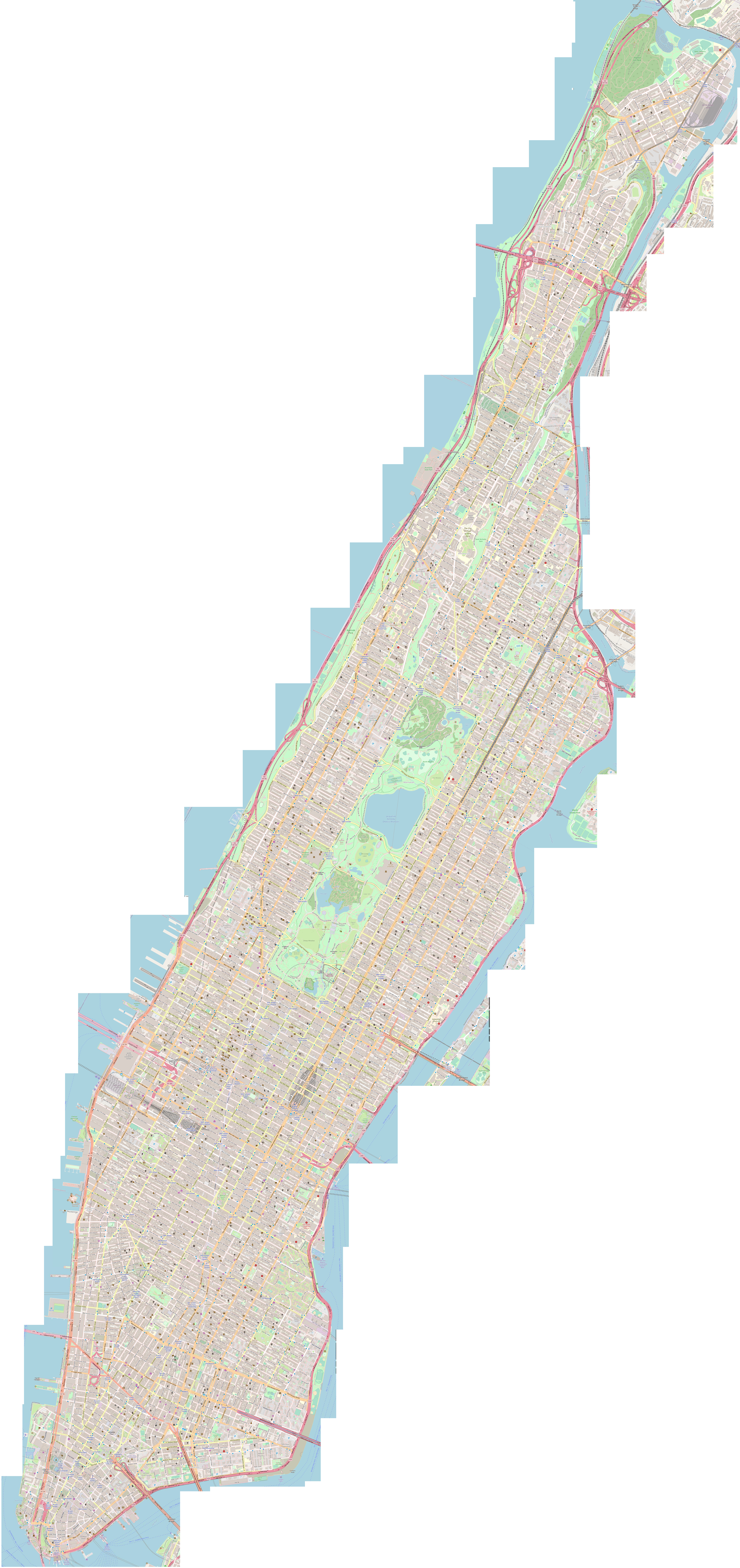
Map of Manhattan, the most densely populated borough of New York City, and the economic, cultural and administrative center of the city.

New York City comprises five boroughs, an unusual form of government used to administer the five constituent counties that make up the city. Throughout the boroughs there are hundreds of distinct neighborhoods, many with a definable history and character all their own. If the boroughs were each independent cities, four of the boroughs (Brooklyn, Queens, Manhattan, and the Bronx) would be among the ten most populous cities in the United States.

- The Bronx (Bronx County, pop. 1,364,566) is New York City's northernmost borough. It is the birthplace of rap and hip hop culture, the site of Yankee Stadium, and home to the largest cooperatively owned housing complex in the United States, Co-op City. Except for a small piece of Manhattan known as Marble Hill, the Bronx is the only section of the city that is part of the North American mainland.
- Brooklyn (Kings County, pop. 2,511,408) is the city's most populous borough and was an independent city until 1898. Brooklyn is known for its cultural diversity, an independent art scene, distinct neighborhoods and a unique architectural heritage. The borough also features a long beachfront and Coney Island, famous as one of the earliest amusement grounds in the country.
- Manhattan (New York County, pop. 1,606,275) is the most densely populated borough and home to most of the city's skyscrapers. The borough contains the major business centers of the city and many cultural attractions. Manhattan is loosely divided into downtown, midtown, and uptown regions.
- Queens (Queens County, pop. 2,256,576) is geographically the largest borough and the most ethnically diverse county in the United States. Historically a collection of small towns and villages founded by the Dutch, the borough today is mainly residential and middle class, with enclaves of above average income and wealth. It is the only large county in the United States where the median income among African-American households, about $52,000 a year, has surpassed that of Caucasian households. Queens is the site of Citi Field and its predecessor Shea Stadium, the home of the New York Mets, and annually hosts the US Tennis Open.
- Staten Island (Richmond County, pop. 475,014) is the most suburban in character of the five boroughs. It is connected to Brooklyn by the Verrazzano–Narrows Bridge and to Manhattan by the free Staten Island Ferry. Until 2001 the borough was home to the Fresh Kills Landfill, formerly the largest landfill in the world, which is now being reconstructed as Freshkills Park, one of the largest urban parks in the United States.

== Environmental issues ==
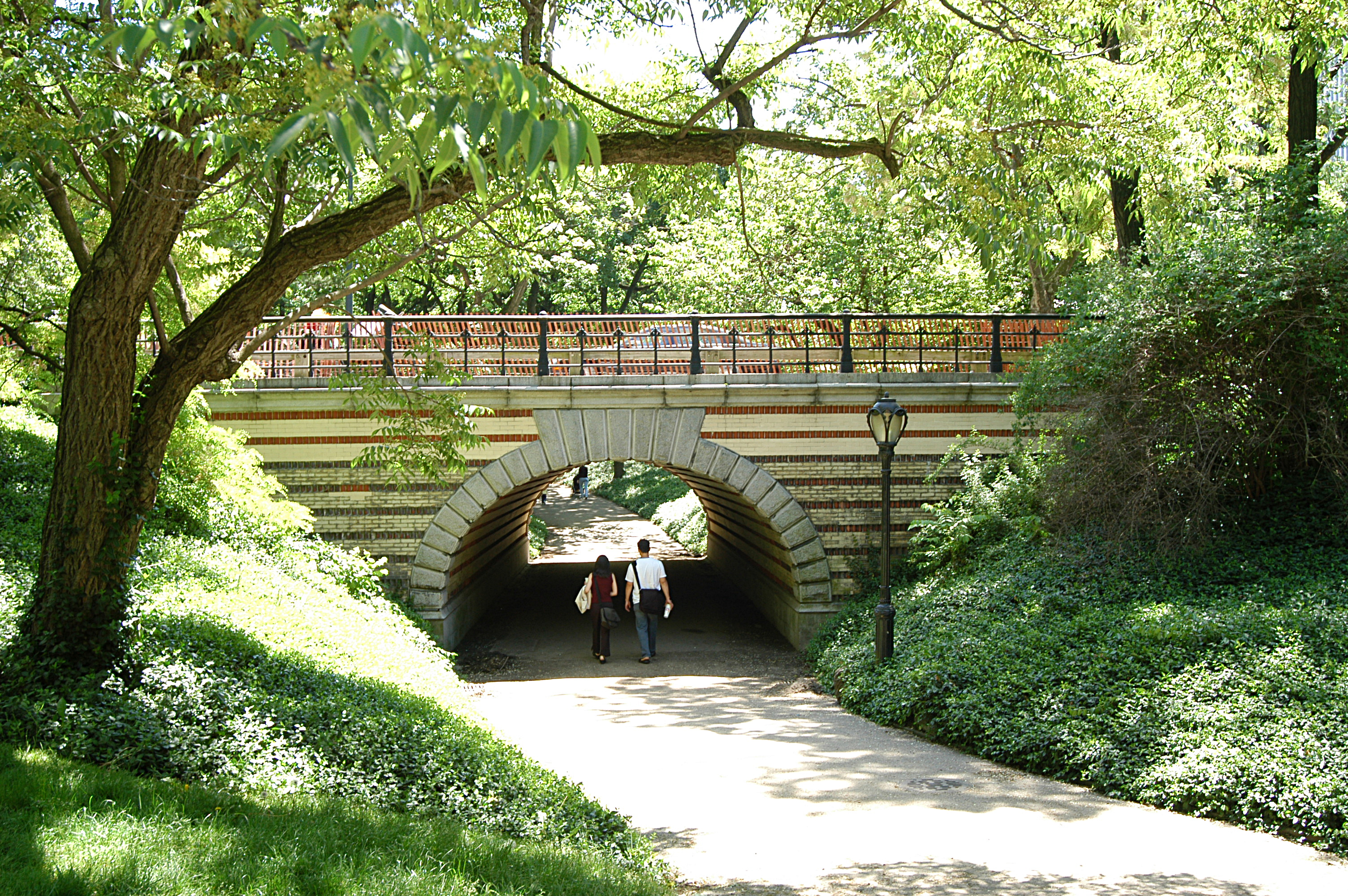
Central Park is nearly twice as big as the world's second-smallest country, Monaco. Historically its reservoirs were important components of the city's water supply.

New York City plays an important role in the green policy agenda because of its size. Environmental groups make large efforts to help shape legislation in New York because they see the strategy as an efficient way to influence national programs. The magnitude of New York City's economy gives the city potential to set new de facto standards.

Although cities like San Francisco or Portland, Oregon, are most commonly associated with urban environmentalism in the United States, New York City's unique urban footprint and extensive transportation systems make it more sustainable than most American cities.

== Maps and satellite images ==
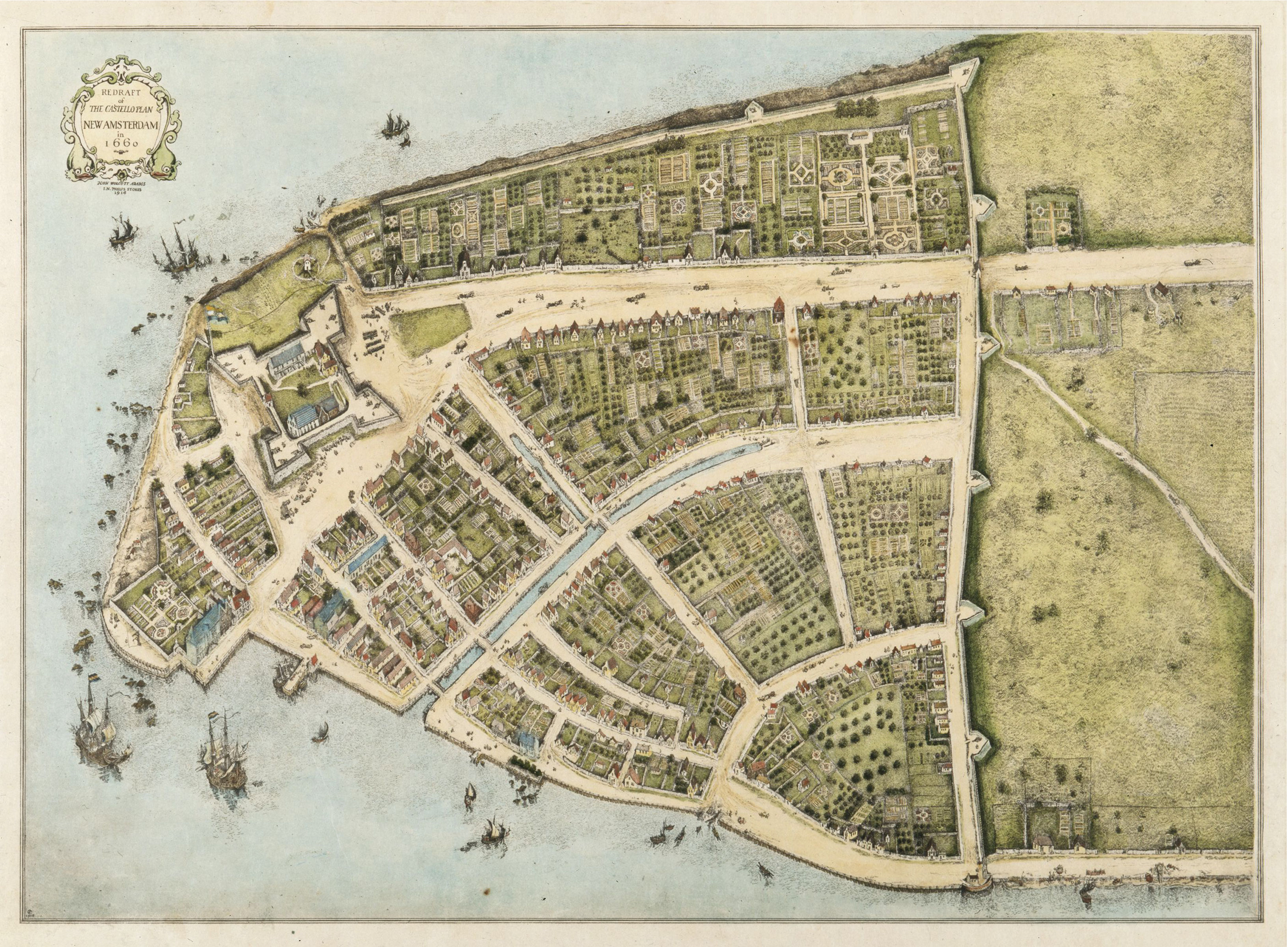
New Amsterdam in 1660

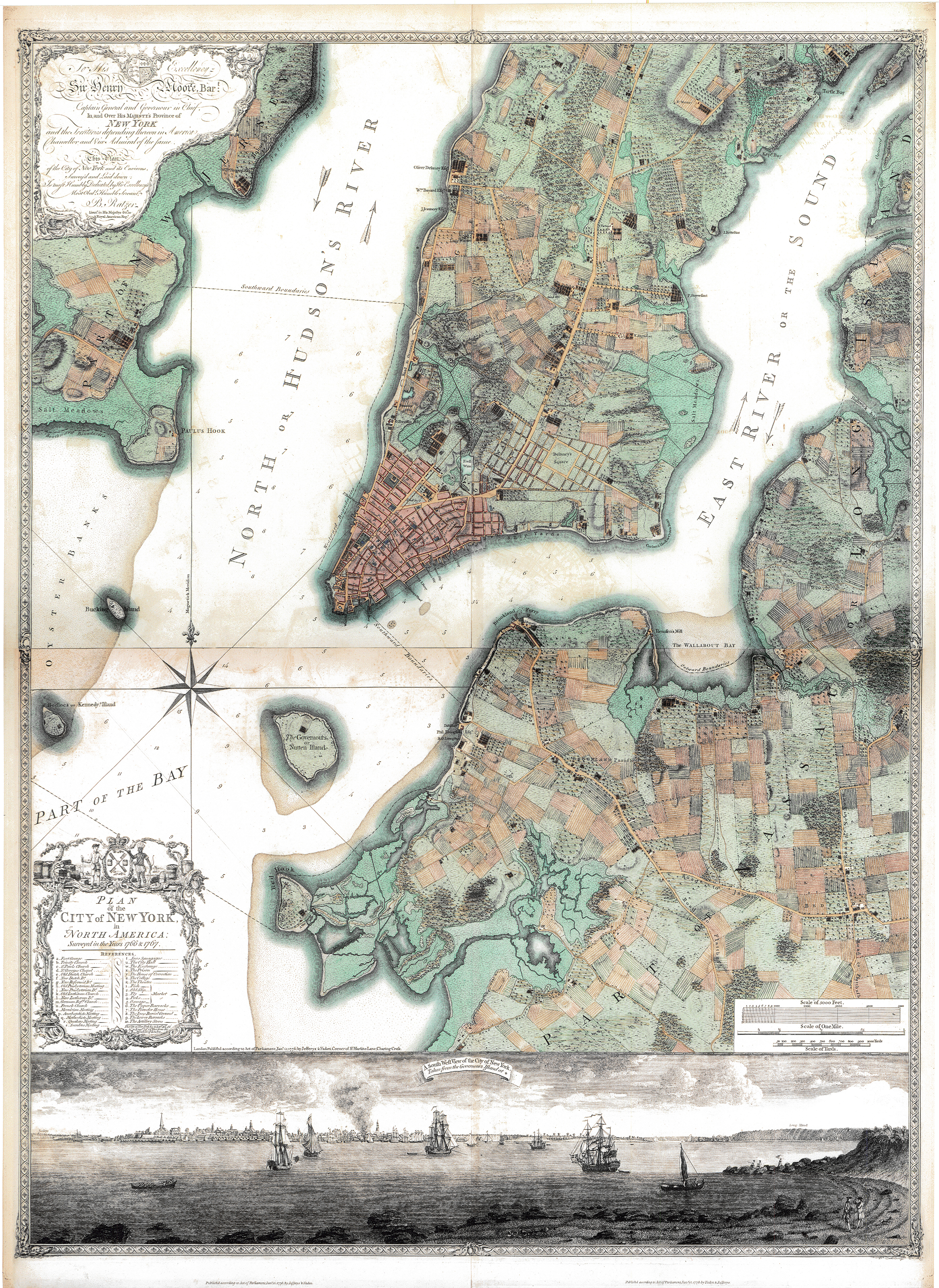
One of the 1770 Ratzer Maps

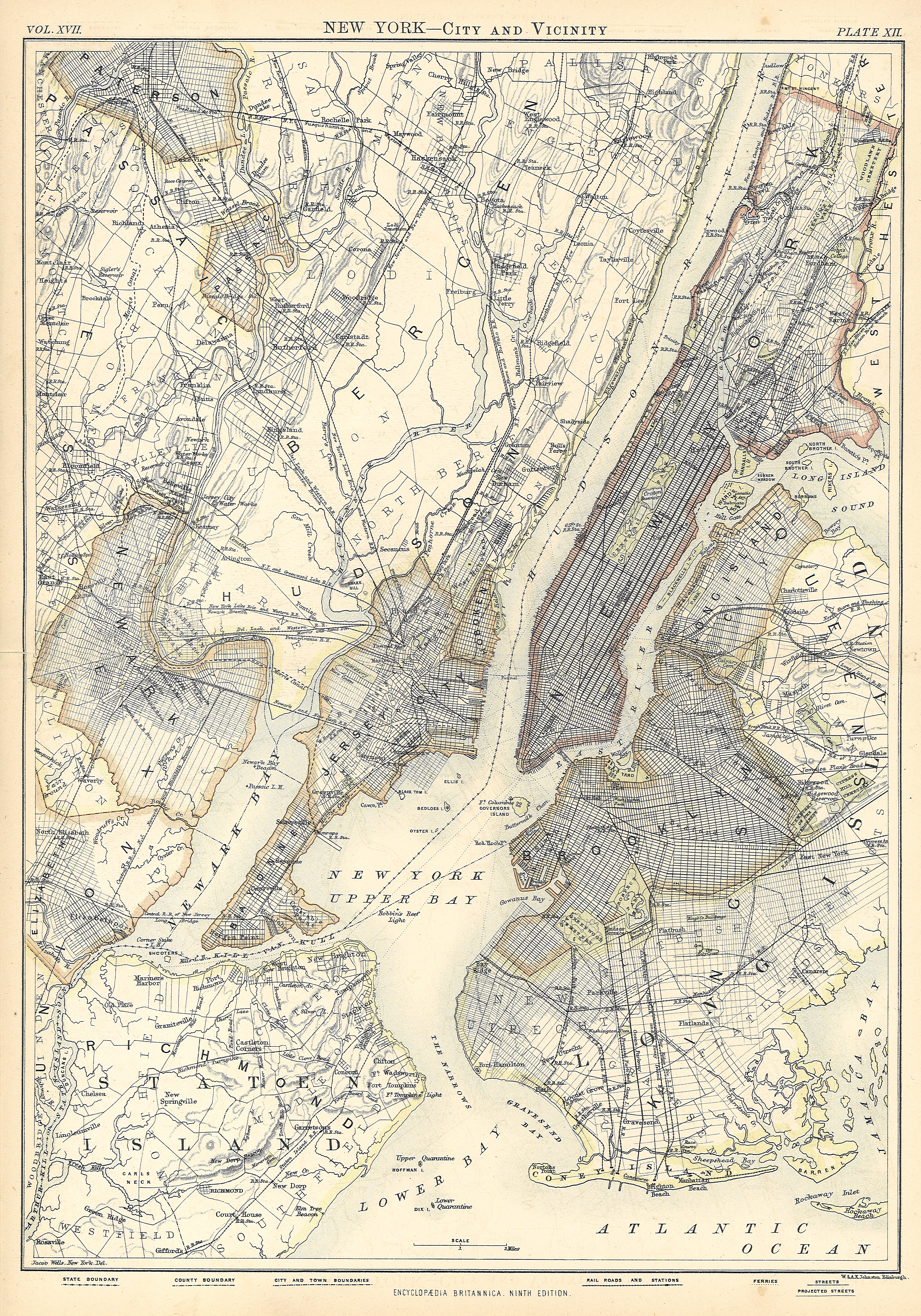
New York City and the city of Brooklyn, in 1885

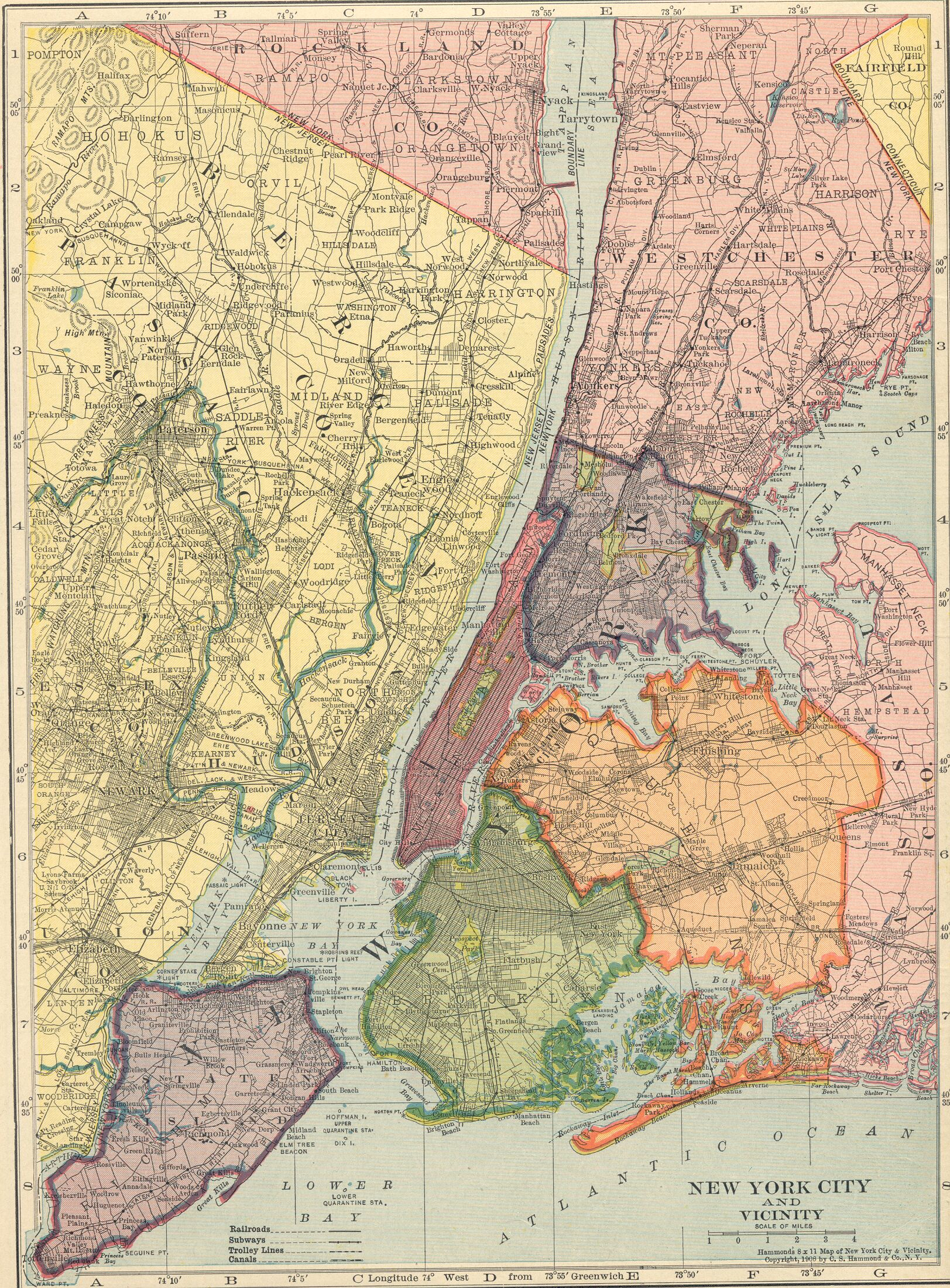
New York City area in 1906

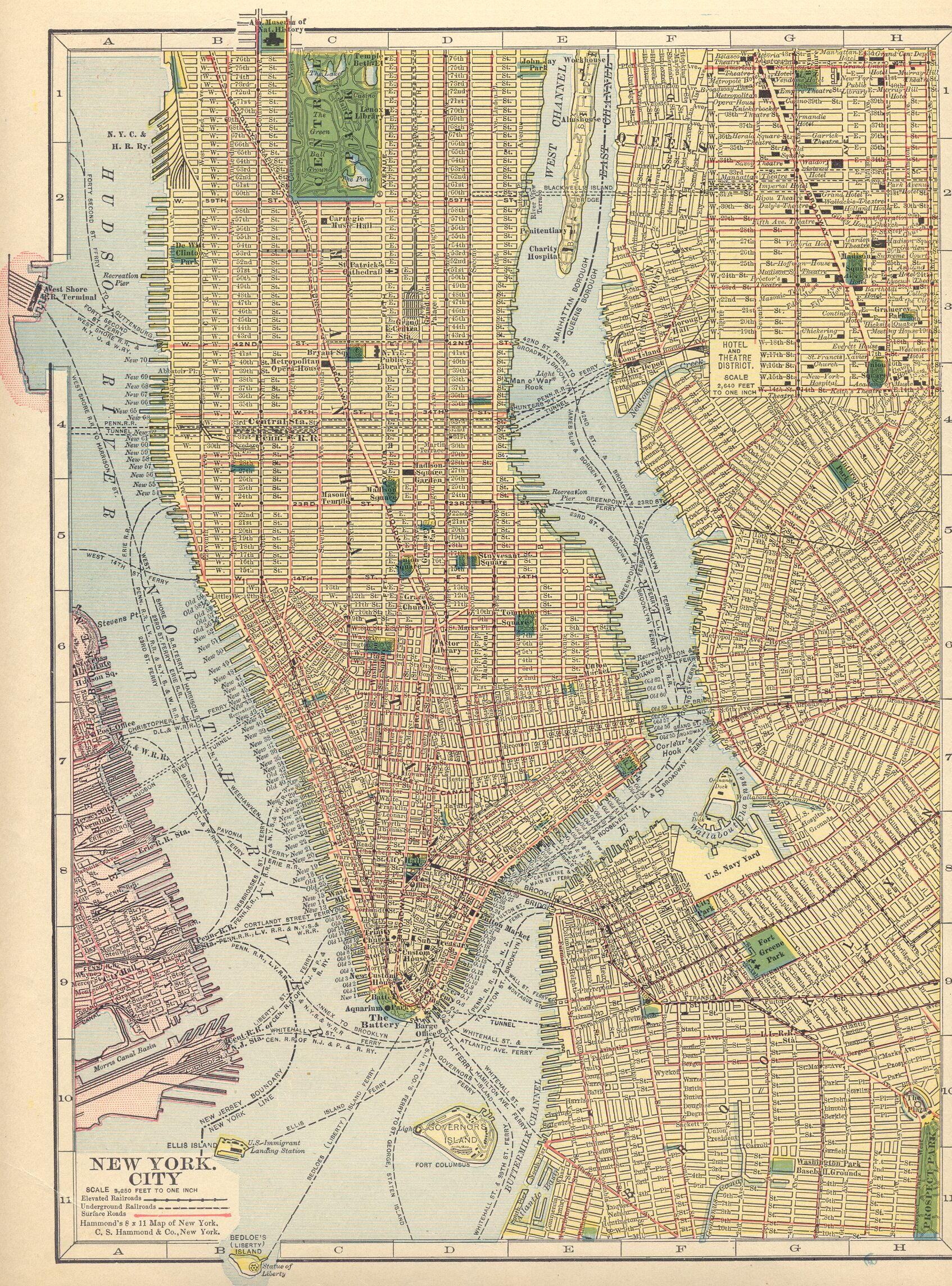
Downtown New York City in 1910

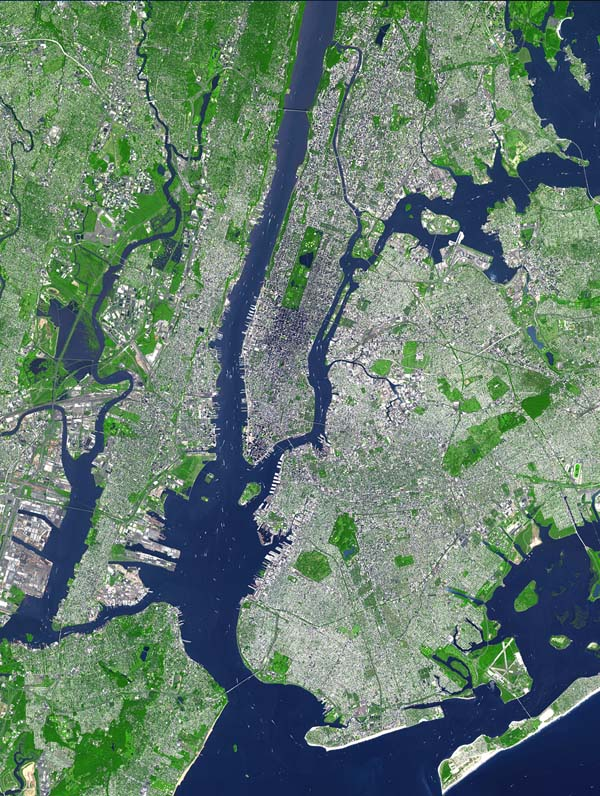
False-color satellite image

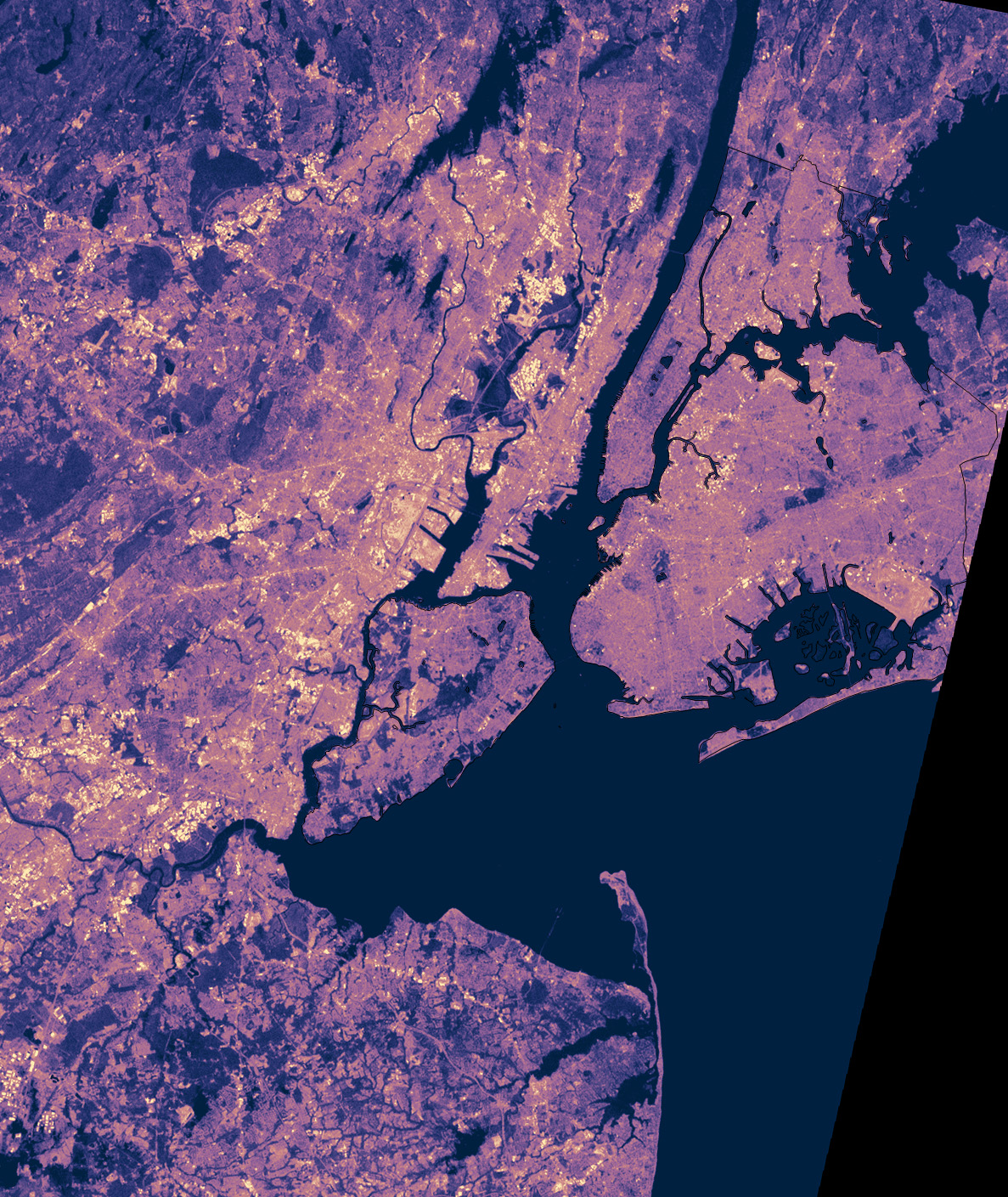
Thermal image (blue is warm, yellow is hot)

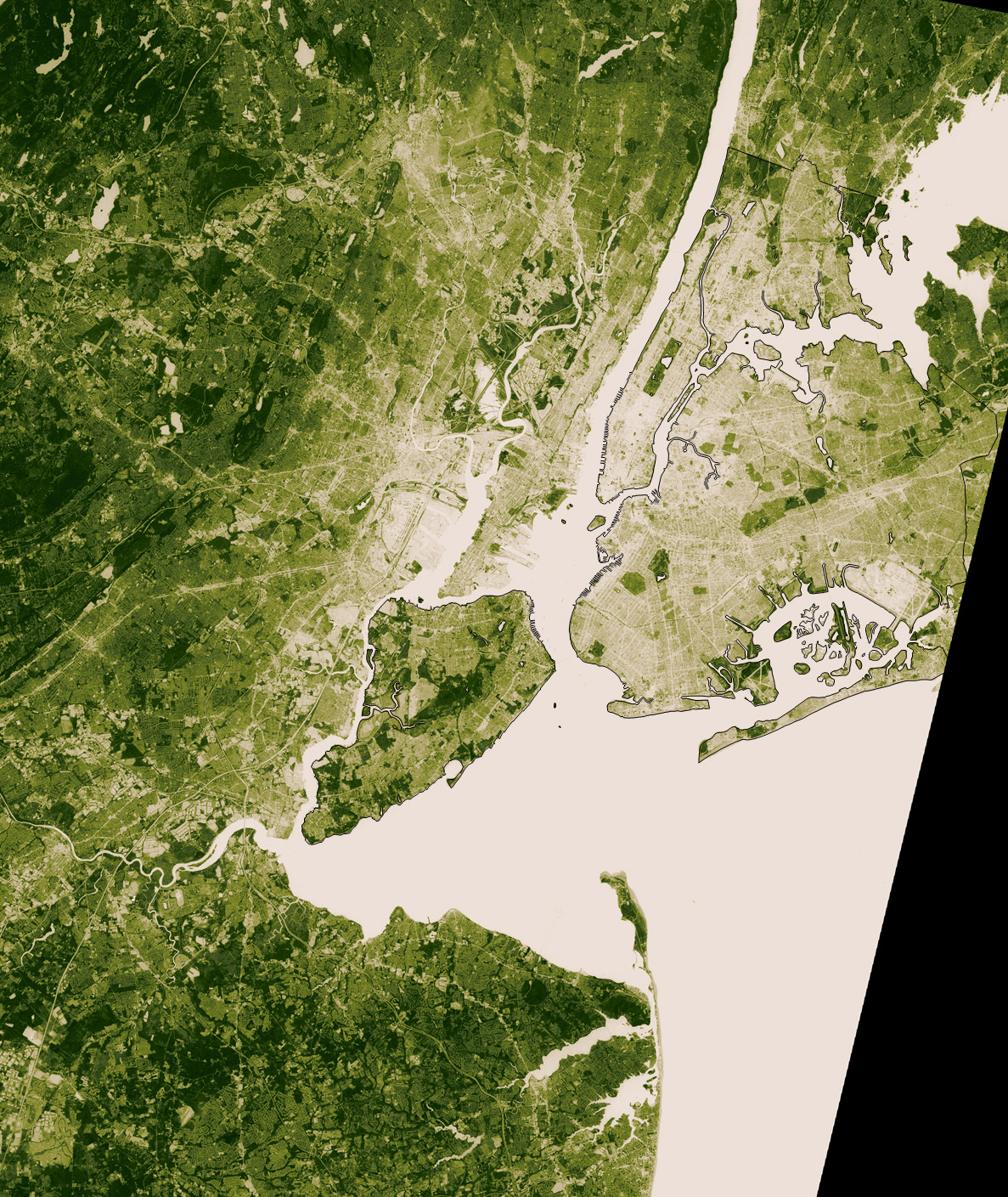
Vegetation is beige (sparse) and deep green (dense)

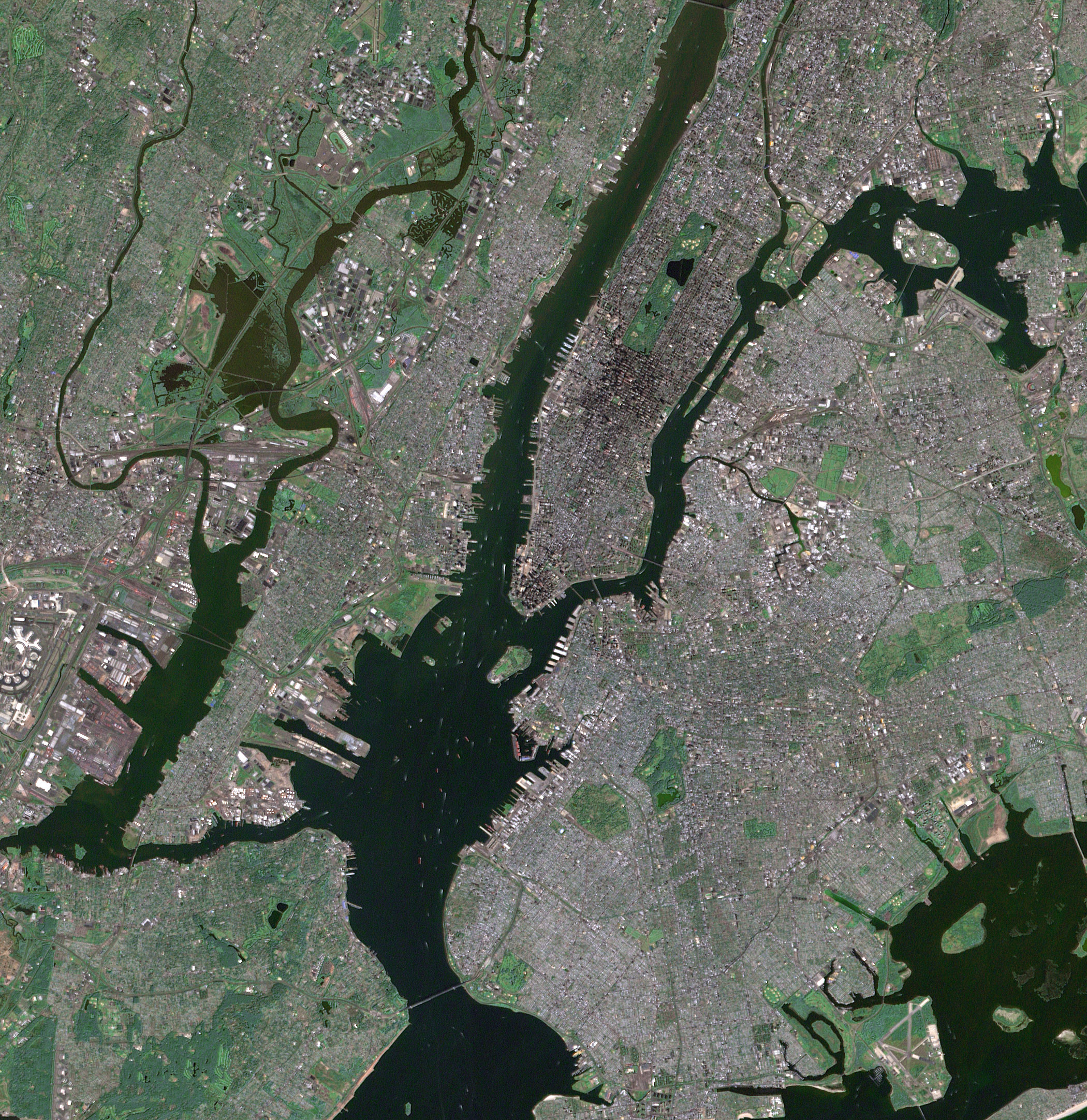
Satellite photograph of southern Manhattan taken in 2002

== See also ==
- Climate change in New York City
- Geography of New York–New Jersey Harbor Estuary
- New York metropolitan area
- Northeast megalopolis
- New York City Audubon
