= Pale Male =

Red-tailed hawk living in New York City (1990–2023)

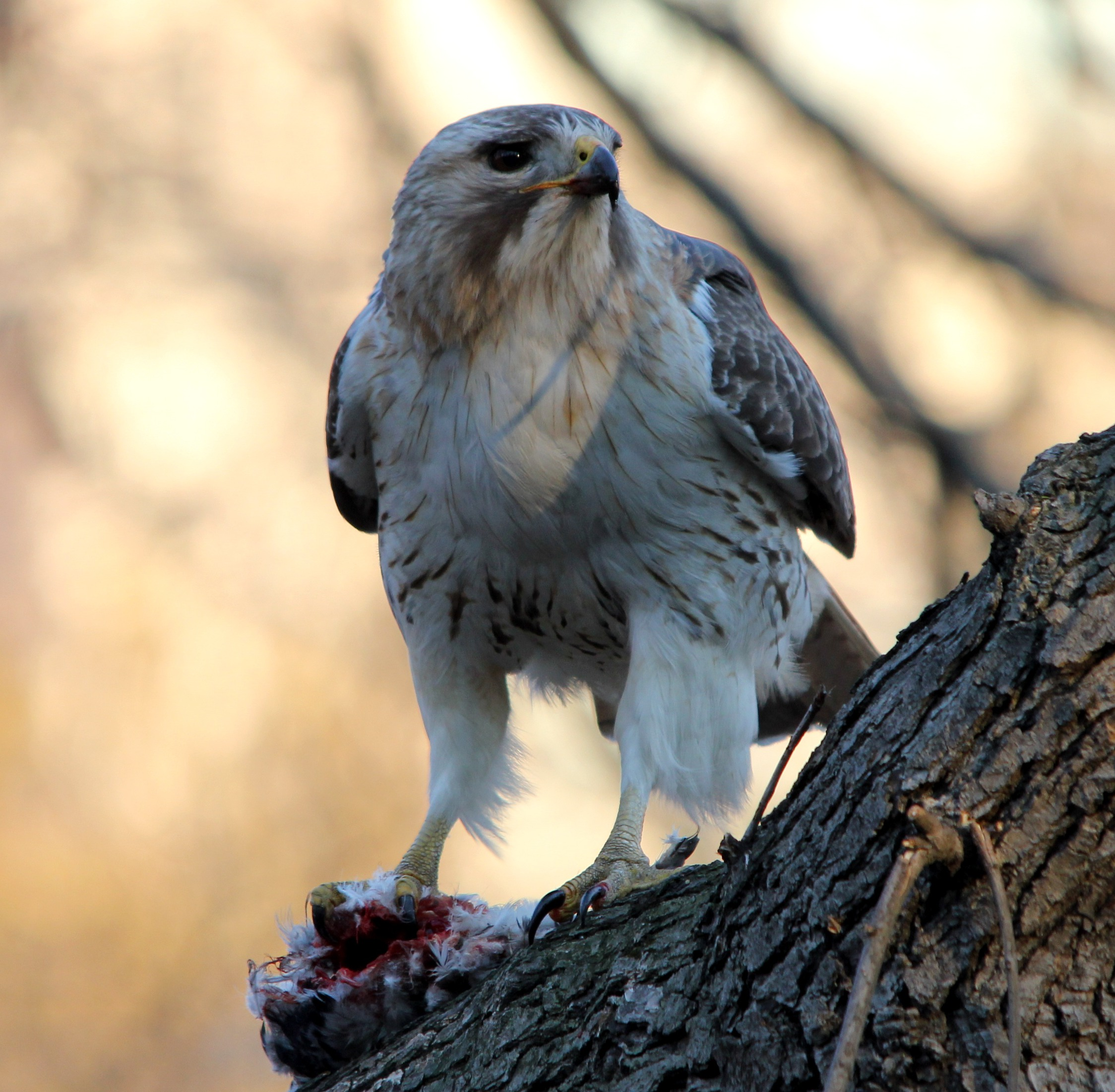
- Pale Male eating a pigeon in 2011
- Species: Buteo jamaicensis
- Sex: Male
- Hatched: 1990
- Died: May 16, 2023 (aged 32–33); Long Island, New York, U.S.
- Nationality: United States
- Known for: Nesting on 927 Fifth Avenue
- Mates: First Love (1992, c. 1995–1997); Chocolate (c. 1992–1995); Blue (1998 – c. September 11, 2001); Lola (2002 – December 2010); Lima (on-and-off; early 2011 – February 25, 2012); Paula (2011); Zena (2012); Octavia (2012–2023)

Pale Male (1990 – May 16, 2023), or Palemale, was a red-tailed hawk that resided in and near New York City's Central Park from the 1990s until 2023. Birdwatcher and author Marie Winn gave him his name because of the unusually light coloring of his head. He was one of the first red-tailed hawks known to have nested on a building rather than in a tree and is known for establishing a dynasty of urban-dwelling red-tailed hawks.

Each spring, bird watchers would set up telescopes alongside Central Park's Model Boat Pond to observe his nest and chicks at 927 Fifth Avenue. Although it was suggested over the years that Pale Male could have died and been replaced by a similarly colored bird without the change being observed, there was no strong evidence to confirm or deny this possibility.

== Life ==
When he arrived in Central Park in 1991, as a first-year immature hawk, Pale Male tried to nest in a tree, but he was driven off by crows. He later roosted on a building on Fifth Avenue across the street from the park. Around early 1992, he found a mate, dubbed "First Love". First Love was injured later that year and removed to the Raptor Trust in Morris County, New Jersey. During her absence, Pale Male took another mate. After several unsuccessful spring nesting attempts, Pale Male and a mate hatched three eyasses in 1995. The eyasses survived to young adulthood and took up residence in Central Park.

First Love returned to Central Park after being banded and released from the Raptor Trust. She and Pale Male reunited and raised several eyasses. Some birdwatchers waited several months to see the eyasses grow and then take their first flights. Pale Male brought food to his offspring about five times each day. In 1997, First Love died after eating a poisoned pigeon in Central Park.

Pale Male's mate from 1998 to 2001 was a hawk known as Blue. The pair were observed to hatch about 11 eyasses in that period. Blue disappeared about the time of the September 11 attacks in 2001. In early 2002, Pale Male was first observed with a new mate, Lola. They raised seven eyasses between 2002 and 2004, building a nest on ornamental stonework above a top-story window on a residential housing cooperative at 927 Fifth Avenue, near 74th Street on the Upper East Side of Manhattan. Although Pale Male and Lola collected sticks for a potential nest at a cooperative on the Upper West Side, the Beresford at 81st Street and Central Park West, in 2006, they never nested there. Lola disappeared in December 2010 and was presumed dead.

A new mate appeared in early January 2011. This new hawk, Lima, also called "Ginger", because of her dark feathers on her neck and chin, was only in her second year. She was a young adult, with still-yellow irises, indicating her exact age. Her first nesting attempt was in the winter and spring of 2011 using the existing nest. Ginger exhibited behavior consistent with incubation of eggs in mid-April 2011 and two eyasses emerged towards the end of May 2011, producing the first baby hawks in this nest since 2004. Lima died in late February 2012, presumably after eating a poisoned rat.

After Lima's death, Pale Male took a new mate, dubbed Zena. The two fledged three offspring, two of which were poisoned, rescued, rehabilitated, and then released back into Central Park. In September 2012, Zena disappeared and was presumed dead, and Pale Male took a new mate, called "Octavia" due to her status as Pale Male's eighth mate.

It was suggested in 2015 that Pale Male could have died sometime over the years and been replaced without birdwatchers' notice by another male hawk with similar coloring, but no substantive evidence has been provided for either fate.

== Death ==
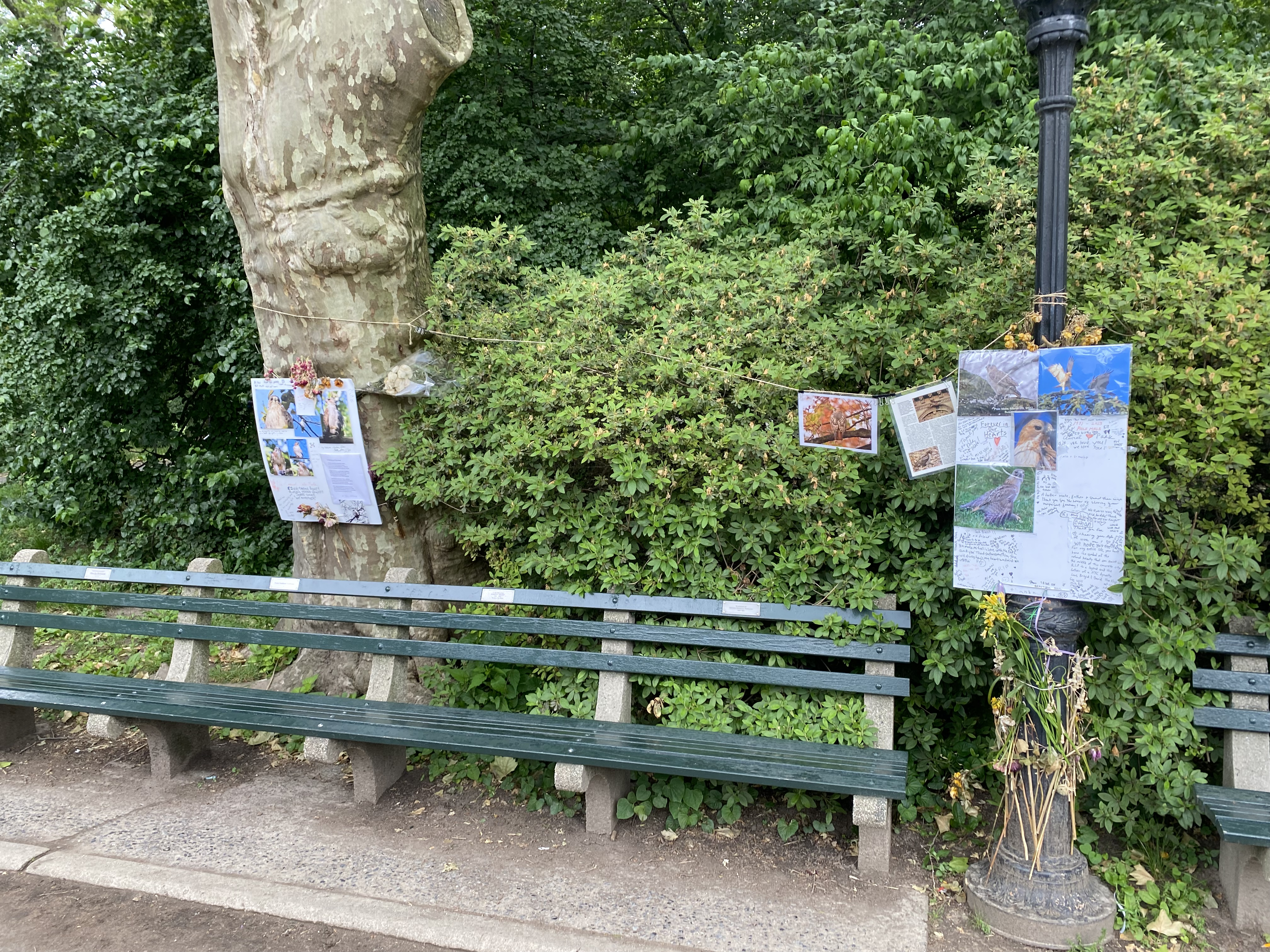
A makeshift memorial for Pale Male near Conservatory Water in Central Park in June 2023

On May 16, 2023, wildlife rehabilitator Bob Horvath reported that Pale Male had been found "sick and grounded in Central Park" by New York City Urban Park Ranger Nick Baisley the previous day, on May 15, 2023. Pale Male was transferred into Horvath's custody and he immediately took the hawk to the veterinary. Blood work and X-ray scans were done and Horvath then took him to WINORR to provide supportive care while they waited for the test results. Pale Male died on the evening of May 16, 2023, at age 33.

== Nest controversy ==
In early December 2004, the hawks' nest and the anti-pigeon spikes that had long anchored it were removed by the board of the co-op due to concerns about debris from the nest falling to the street below. The removal caused an international outcry and a series of impassioned protests organized by New York City Audubon Society and the Central Park birding community. Mary Tyler Moore, a resident of the building and animal rights advocate, also participated in the protests. By December 12, 2004, the building, various city agencies, and the Audubon Society agreed to seek a solution, and quickly came to an agreement to replace the spikes and to install a new "cradle" for the nest. By December 28, 2004, the scaffolding had been removed and the hawks started bringing twigs to the nest site.

However, eggs laid by Lola in March 2005 did not hatch, and in fact Pale Male and Lola did not hatch any new eyasses since the disturbance of their original nest. A panel of experts assembled by the Audubon Society reviewed the photos taken of the interior of the nest on January 4, 2008, and recommended the removal of stainless steel spikes seen protruding through the bowl of the nest. The spikes impeded the rolling of the eggs by the female during incubation. The Audubon Society obtained the support and approvals of municipal agencies and property owners to have the 92 spikes removed from the cradle supporting the nest.

== Other red-tailed hawks in the area ==
Since 2000, other adult hawk pairs have nested in or on the bounds of Central Park, with varying degrees of success.

At the south end of the park, a hawk couple dubbed Pale Male Junior (or simply "Junior") and Charlotte nested on the Trump Park Hotel on Central Park South in 2005.

Following reports of red-tails attempting to nest on or near the Plaza Hotel at the southeast corner of Central Park, a pair of red-tails built a nest in a tree on the edge of the park's Sheep Meadow in 2014 and raised two baby hawks.

Reports of further attempts to nest on buildings along or near Central Park South since 2016 have continued, e.g., at the Ritz-Carlton in 2022, but none have been reported successful.

A pair of red-tails known for several years of unsuccessful nesting attempts on buildings along Central Park West built a nest in Central Park's Pinetum in 2022 and successfully fledged two babies.

A hawk couple known as Tristan and Isolde claimed Central Park's Great Hill and North Wood as their territory in 2006, but their nest was located about four blocks from the park at the Cathedral of St. John the Divine, overlooking Morningside Park. Although both Tristan and Isolde have since died or disappeared, they and their successors at the cathedral nest had fledged 28 baby red-tails as of 2020.

Attempted red-tail nesting activity has been reported at other locations on the periphery of Central Park, including locations on Central Park West since 2013, but none were successful until 2021. In 2021 and 2022, a pair of red-tailed hawks nested on the Terence Cardinal Cooke Health Center, across Fifth Avenue from Central Park's Conservatory Garden, and hatches were reported there.

== New York City red-tail population ==
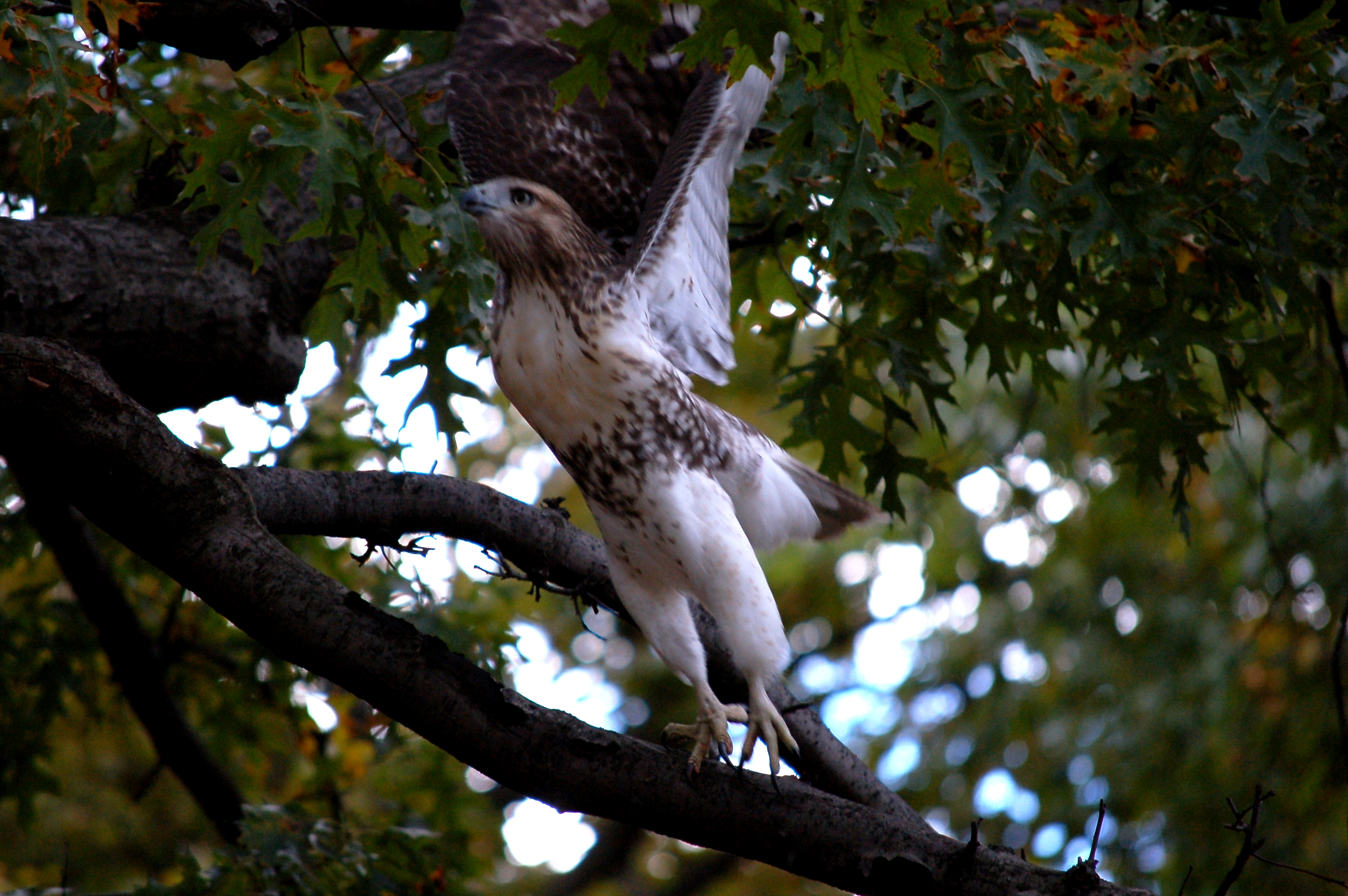
A red-tailed hawk in Riverside Park in Manhattan

A 2007 study commissioned by the Audubon Society reported that pairs of red-tails were spotted breeding in nests at 32 locations throughout the city, and hawk watchers say they have spotted dozens of unattached red-tails across the five boroughs. Since 2010, there have typically been about ten active red-tailed hawk nests in Manhattan per year. For example, in 2014, there were at least eleven red-tailed nests reported in Manhattan, of which ten were known to have fledged baby hawks. In 2021 there were ten nests reported, but only five were confirmed to fledge at least a young bird.

Relatively small green spaces about the city may see red-tailed hawk visitors, while slightly larger locations, such as Washington Square Park, Tompkins Square Park, the Fordham University Rose Hill campus, and the main Columbia University campus, may support nesting pairs.

== In popular culture ==
- Pale Male, a one-hour documentary by filmmaker Frederic Lilien, aired on WNET's Nature in 2004. A feature documentary called The Legend of Pale Male by Frederic Lilien was completed in April 2009.
- Alternative country singer Steve Earle references Pale Male in his song "Down Here Below", from the 2007 album Washington Square Serenade.
- A puppet of Pale Male made several appearances on Late Night with Conan O'Brien where he played various instruments with The Max Weinberg 7.
- At least three children's illustrated books about Pale Male have been published, including:
  - The Tale of Pale Male: A True Story, by Jeanette Winter (Harcourt, 2007)
  - City Hawk: The Story of Pale Male, by Meghan McCarthy (Simon & Schuster, 2007)
  - Pale Male: Citizen Hawk of New York City, by Janet Schulman (Knopf, 2008).
- Pale Male is the mascot of PS 6, an elementary school on the Upper East Side.

== See also ==
- List of individual birds
