= 927 Fifth Avenue =

Residential skyscraper in Manhattan, New York

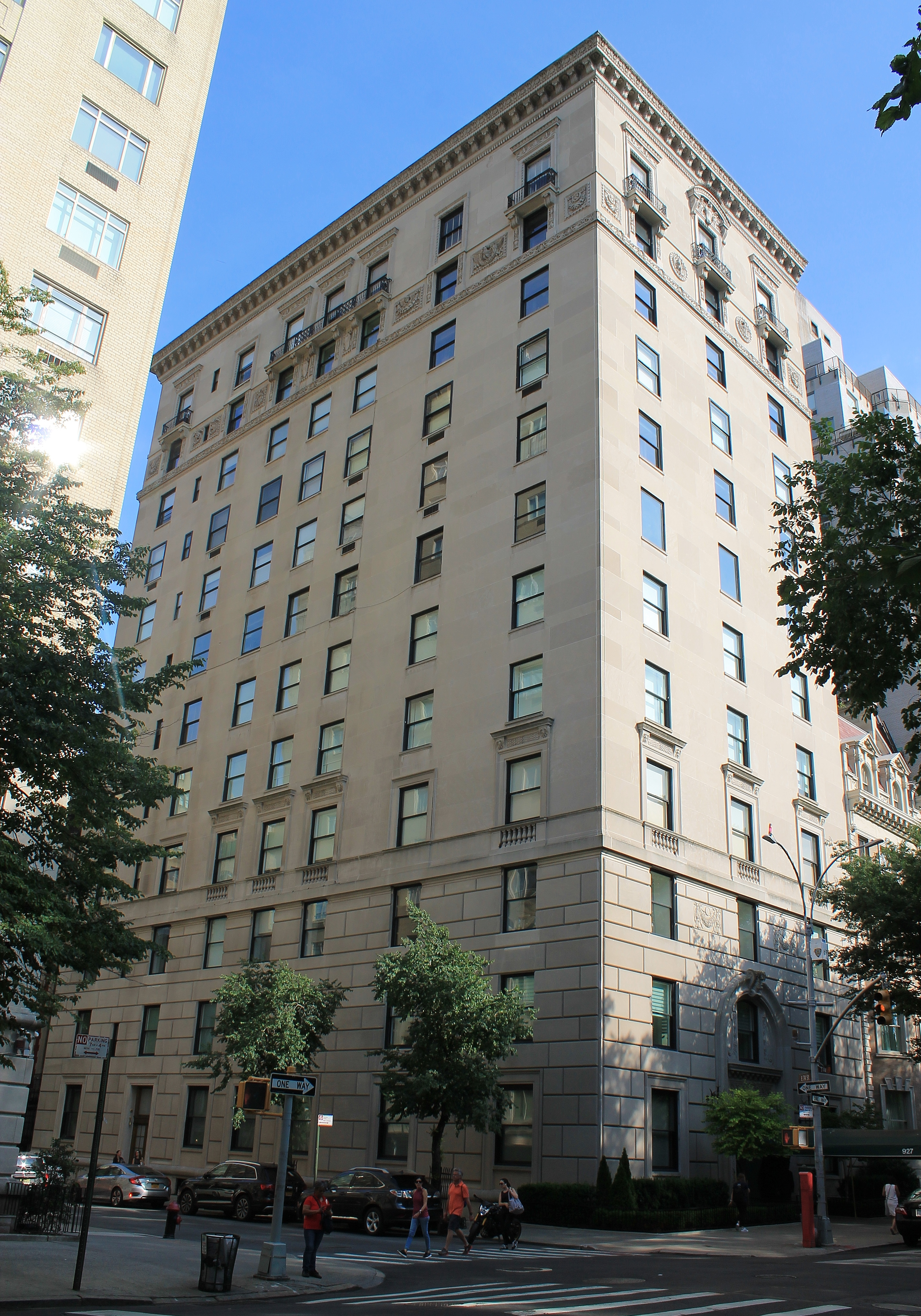
- Interactive map of the 927 Fifth Avenue area

General information
- Type: Condominium
- Architectural style: Renaissance Revival
- Location: 927 Fifth Avenue, Manhattan, New York, United States
- Coordinates: 40.7735°N 73.9660°W
- Current tenants: approx. 12–24 tenants
- Construction started: 1917
- Completed: 1917

Height
- Height: 132.91 feet (40.51 m)

Technical details
- Structural system: Skyscraper
- Floor count: 12 (12 apartments)

Design and construction
- Architecture firm: Warren & Wetmore

927 Fifth Avenue is an upscale residential apartment building in Manhattan, New York City, United States. It is located on Fifth Avenue at the corner of East 74th Street opposite the Conservatory Water in Central Park. The limestone-clad building was designed by Warren & Wetmore, also known for designing Grand Central Terminal, and completed in 1917 in the Renaissance Revival style.

The building is incorporated as a housing cooperative. It has 12 apartments on 12 floors. Former residents include Paula Zahn and Mary Tyler Moore who moved out in 2005.

The co-op became well-known when Pale Male, a red-tailed hawk that nests on ornamental stonework above a 12th-floor window, was featured in an episode of the PBS series Nature. It later gained international notoriety when the board of the cooperative decided to evict the hawks in December 2004. Protests and widespread negative news coverage led to the restoration of the nest three weeks later.
