= Neonyssus =

Invalid genus of mites

Neonyssus is a former genus of the mite family Rhinonyssidae that has been determined to be a taxonomic synonym of the genus Ptilonyssus.
