= Agapornyssus =

Invalid genus of mites

Agapornyssus is a former genus of the mite family Rhinonyssidae that has been determined to be a taxonomic synonym of the genus Sternostoma.
