= Ptilonyssus echinatus =

Scientific classification
- Kingdom: Animalia
- Phylum: Arthropoda
- Subphylum: Chelicerata
- Class: Arachnida
- Order: Mesostigmata
- Family: Rhinonyssidae
- Genus: Ptilonyssus
- Species: P. echinatus

Binomial name
- Ptilonyssus echinatus Berlese & Trouessart, 1889

Species of mite

Ptilonyssus echinatus is a nasal mite found in birds including the pale crag martin.
