= Save the Trafalgar Square Pigeons =

UK organization

- Founded: 2000, London, England, United Kingdom
- Purpose: Environmentalism
- Region served: Trafalgar Square, London
- Method: Lobbying, feeding pigeons

Save the Trafalgar Square Pigeons (also known as STTSP) is an organisation that claims to oppose cruelty to wild birds, especially feral pigeons, in Trafalgar Square, London, England since the organisation's creation in 2000.

== History ==
The group was formed in 2000 when Ken Livingstone, Mayor of London, tried to reduce the number of pigeons in Trafalgar Square. These reductions were to be made by a number of techniques, including the removal of the Trafalgar Square bird food seller's licence. While feeding was still legal, feeders alleged that they were subjected to a period of intimidatory harassment in late October–early December 2002, during the course of which a Harris's Hawk was also introduced.

== Argument ==
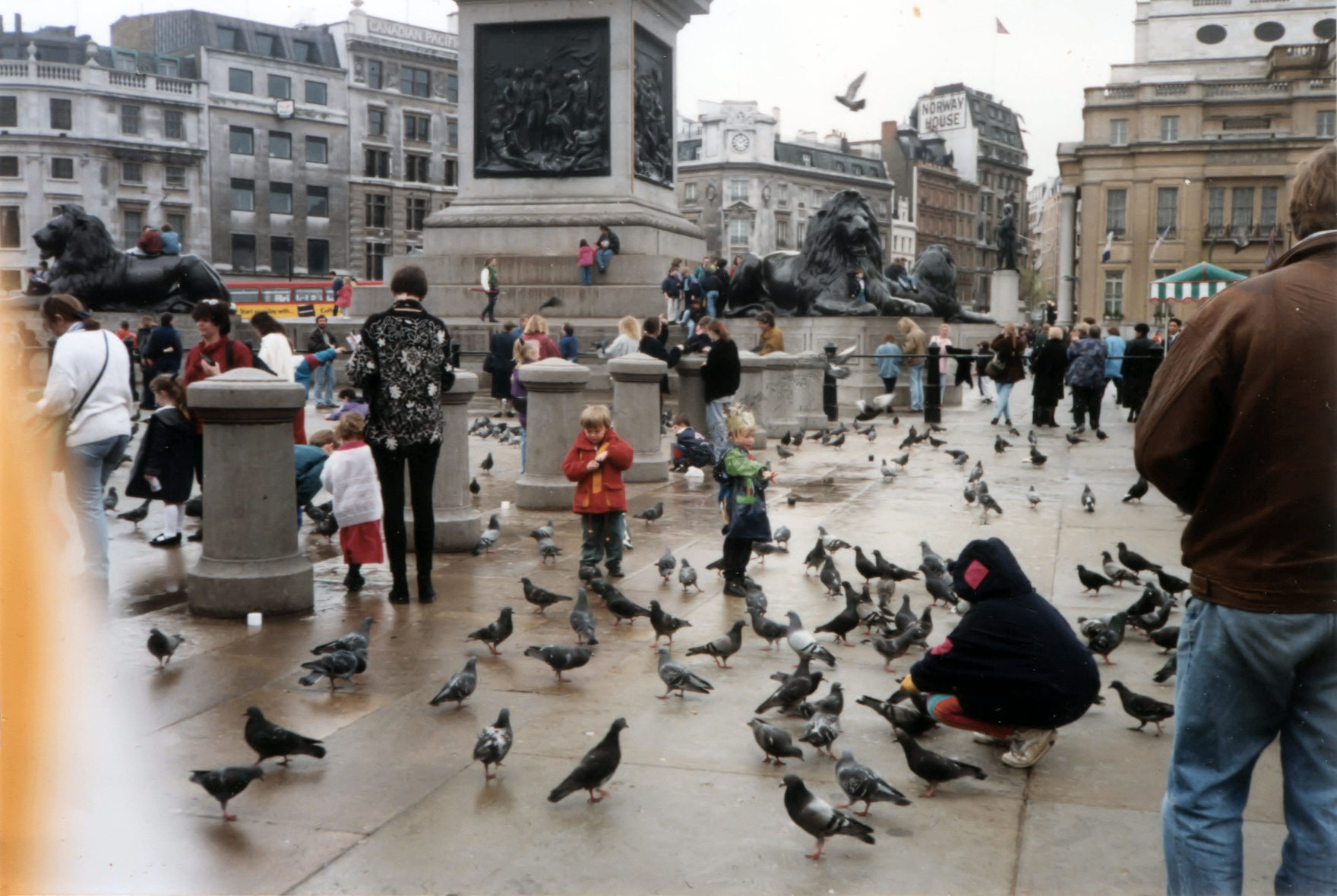
People feeding pigeons in Trafalgar Square c.1993

STTSP argued that completely removing the birds' food was cruel and would lead to a large number of them dying of starvation. They said that reducing the birds' food source over a longer time scale would result in the reduction of the population as they would have to find an alternative food source. Ken Livingstone claimed that the reduction in the number of birds in the Square was to create a "more pleasant environment." In the run up to the ban Trafalgar Square had undergone a £25 million renovation and £140,000 worth of damage had been caused to Nelson's Column as a result of bird droppings.

== Agreement ==
Following the alleged period of harassment STTSP eventually went into an agreement with the Greater London Authority in that there would be a reduction in bird numbers so long as this was carried out through non-cruel means, via food reduction instead of starvation. The group were then allowed to feed the birds at 7:30 a.m. once a day. This approach saw a reduction in bird numbers in Trafalgar Square from 4000 to around 200. This restriction was to last until October 2008.

=== Agreement rescinded ===
In 2003 Ken Livingstone and the GLA rescinded their agreement with STTSP and made it illegal for anyone to feed the birds in Trafalgar Square; the penalty for doing so was set at £50. On 10 September 2007 by-laws were secured that ensured bird feeding was banned throughout the entire square and surrounding areas, with a higher fine of £500 if this law was broken.
