= Ptilonyssus calvaria =

Scientific classification
- Kingdom: Animalia
- Phylum: Arthropoda
- Subphylum: Chelicerata
- Class: Arachnida
- Order: Mesostigmata
- Family: Rhinonyssidae
- Genus: Ptilonyssus
- Species: P. calvaria

Binomial name
- Ptilonyssus calvaria Knee, 2008

Species of mite

Ptilonyssus calvaria is a mite that is parasitic in the nasal passages of some birds found in Alberta and Manitoba, Canada.
