= Sternostoma setifer =

Scientific classification
- Kingdom: Animalia
- Phylum: Arthropoda
- Subphylum: Chelicerata
- Class: Arachnida
- Order: Mesostigmata
- Family: Rhinonyssidae
- Genus: Sternostoma
- Species: S. setifer

Binomial name
- Sternostoma setifer Knee, 2008

Species of mite

Sternostoma setifer is a mite that is parasitic in the nasal passages of some North American birds, including bluebirds and martins.
