= Ruandanyssus =

Scientific classification
- Domain: Eukaryota
- Kingdom: Animalia
- Phylum: Arthropoda
- Subphylum: Chelicerata
- Class: Arachnida
- Order: Mesostigmata
- Family: Rhinonyssidae
- Genus: Ruandanyssus; Fain, 1957

Genus of mites

Ruandanyssus is a genus of mites in the family Rhinonyssidae. There are at least three described species in Ruandanyssus.

== Species ==
These three species belong to the genus Ruandanyssus:

- Ruandanyssus artami Domrow, 1967
- Ruandanyssus strandmanni Sakakibara, 1968
- Ruandanyssus terpsiphonei Fain, 1957
