= Trochilonyssus =

Scientific classification
- Domain: Eukaryota
- Kingdom: Animalia
- Phylum: Arthropoda
- Subphylum: Chelicerata
- Class: Arachnida
- Order: Mesostigmata
- Family: Rhinonyssidae
- Genus: Trochilonyssus; Fain & Aitken, 1967
- Species: T. trinitatis

Binomial name
- Trochilonyssus trinitatis Fain & Aitken, 1967

Genus of mites

Trochilonyssus is a genus of mites in the family Rhinonyssidae. This genus has a single species, Trochilonyssus trinitatis.
