= Rallinyssus =

Scientific classification
- Domain: Eukaryota
- Kingdom: Animalia
- Phylum: Arthropoda
- Subphylum: Chelicerata
- Class: Arachnida
- Order: Mesostigmata
- Family: Rhinonyssidae
- Genus: Rallinyssus; Strandtmann, 1948

Genus of mites

Rallinyssus is a genus of mites in the family Rhinonyssidae. There are about 12 described species in Rallinyssus.

== Species ==
These 12 species belong to the genus Rallinyssus:

- Rallinyssus amaurornis Wilson, 1965
- Rallinyssus caudistigmus Strandtmann, 1948
- Rallinyssus congolensis Fain, 1956
- Rallinyssus cychramus Wilson, 1965
- Rallinyssus gallinulae Fain, 1960
- Rallinyssus limnocoracis Fain, 1956
- Rallinyssus porzanae Wilson, 1967
- Rallinyssus rallinae Wilson, 1966
- Rallinyssus sorae Pence & Young, 1979
- Rallinyssus strandtmanni Gretillat, 1961
- Rallinyssus trappi (Amaral, 1962)
- Rallinyssus verheyeni Fain, 1963
