= Rhinoecius =

Scientific classification
- Kingdom: Animalia
- Phylum: Arthropoda
- Subphylum: Chelicerata
- Class: Arachnida
- Order: Mesostigmata
- Family: Rhinonyssidae
- Genus: Rhinoecius; Cooreman, 1946

Genus of mites

Rhinoecius is a genus of mites in the family Rhinonyssidae. There are about 12 described species in Rhinoecius.

== Species ==
These 12 species belong to the genus Rhinoecius:

- Rhinoecius aegolii Butenko, 1971
- Rhinoecius africanus (Zumpt & Patterson, 1951)
- Rhinoecius alifanovi Butenko, 1976
- Rhinoecius bisetosus Strandtmann, 1952
- Rhinoecius brikinboricus Butenko, 1976
- Rhinoecius cavannus Wilson, 1968
- Rhinoecius cooremani Strandtmann, 1952
- Rhinoecius grandis Strandtmann, 1952
- Rhinoecius nycteae Butenko, 1976
- Rhinoecius oti Cooreman, 1946
- Rhinoecius subbisetosus Bregetova, 1965
- Rhinoecius tytonis Fain, 1956
