= Locustellonyssus =

Scientific classification
- Domain: Eukaryota
- Kingdom: Animalia
- Phylum: Arthropoda
- Subphylum: Chelicerata
- Class: Arachnida
- Order: Mesostigmata
- Family: Rhinonyssidae
- Genus: Locustellonyssus; Bregetova, 1965

Genus of mites

Locustellonyssus is a genus of mites in the family Rhinonyssidae. There are at least two described species in Locustellonyssus.

== Species ==
These two species belong to the genus Locustellonyssus:

- Locustellonyssus amurensis Bregetova, 1965
- Locustellonyssus sibiricus Butenko & Stanyukovich, 2001
