= Tyranninyssus =

Scientific classification
- Domain: Eukaryota
- Kingdom: Animalia
- Phylum: Arthropoda
- Subphylum: Chelicerata
- Class: Arachnida
- Order: Mesostigmata
- Family: Rhinonyssidae
- Genus: Tyranninyssus; Brooks & Strandtmann, 1960

Genus of mites

Tyranninyssus is a genus of mites in the family Rhinonyssidae. There are at least four described species in Tyranninyssus.

== Species ==
These four species belong to the genus Tyranninyssus:

- Tyranninyssus attilae Fain & Aitken, 1970
- Tyranninyssus myiarchi Cruz, 1971
- Tyranninyssus myiophobi Fain & Aitken, 1967
- Tyranninyssus tyrannus Brooks & Strandtmann, 1960
