= Larinyssus =

Scientific classification
- Domain: Eukaryota
- Kingdom: Animalia
- Phylum: Arthropoda
- Subphylum: Chelicerata
- Class: Arachnida
- Order: Mesostigmata
- Family: Rhinonyssidae
- Genus: Larinyssus; Strandtmann, 1948

Genus of mites

Larinyssus is a genus of mites in the family Rhinonyssidae. There are about five described species in Larinyssus.

== Species ==
These five species belong to the genus Larinyssus:

- Larinyssus benoiti Fain, 1961
- Larinyssus iohanssenae Dimov, 2013
- Larinyssus orbicularis Strandtmann, 1948
- Larinyssus sterna Fain & Holland, 1972
- Larinyssus substerna Butenko, 1975
