= Vitznyssus =

Scientific classification
- Kingdom: Animalia
- Phylum: Arthropoda
- Subphylum: Chelicerata
- Class: Arachnida
- Order: Mesostigmata
- Family: Rhinonyssidae
- Subfamily: Ptilonyssinae
- Genus: Vitznyssus; Castro, 1948

Synonyms
- Astridiella (Fain, 1957)

Genus of arachnids

Vitznyssus is a genus of mites in the family Rhinonyssidae. There are about eight described species in Vitznyssus.

== Species ==
These eight species belong to the genus Vitznyssus:

- Vitznyssus afrotis (Fain, 1966)
- Vitznyssus caprimulgi (Fain, 1957)
- Vitznyssus erici Knee, 2018
- Vitznyssus neotis (Fain, 1957)
- Vitznyssus scotornis (Fain, 1956)
- Vitznyssus tetragis Butenko, 1969
- Vitznyssus tsachevi Dimov & Rojas, 2012
- Vitznyssus vitzthumi (Fain, 1957)
