= Passeronyssus =

Scientific classification
- Domain: Eukaryota
- Kingdom: Animalia
- Phylum: Arthropoda
- Subphylum: Chelicerata
- Class: Arachnida
- Order: Mesostigmata
- Family: Rhinonyssidae
- Genus: Passeronyssus; Fain, 1960

Genus of mites

Passeronyssus is a genus of mites in the family Rhinonyssidae. There are about five described species in Passeronyssus.

== Species ==
These five species belong to the genus Passeronyssus:

- Passeronyssus kittacinclae Fain, 1964
- Passeronyssus megaluri Sakakibara, 1968
- Passeronyssus urieli do Amaral, 1973
- Passeronyssus viduae (Fain, 1956)
- Passeronyssus zeferinoi Amaral, 1973
