= Zumptnyssus =

Scientific classification
- Domain: Eukaryota
- Kingdom: Animalia
- Phylum: Arthropoda
- Subphylum: Chelicerata
- Class: Arachnida
- Order: Mesostigmata
- Family: Rhinonyssidae
- Genus: Zumptnyssus; Fain, 1959
- Species: Z. buboensis

Binomial name
- Zumptnyssus buboensis (Fain, 1958)

Genus of mites

Zumptnyssus is a genus of mites in the family Rhinonyssidae. This genus has a single species, Zumptnyssus buboensis.
