= Rhinonyssus =

Scientific classification
- Domain: Eukaryota
- Kingdom: Animalia
- Phylum: Arthropoda
- Subphylum: Chelicerata
- Class: Arachnida
- Order: Mesostigmata
- Family: Rhinonyssidae
- Genus: Rhinonyssus; Trouessart, 1894

Genus of mites

Rhinonyssus is a genus of mites in the family Rhinonyssidae. There are more than 30 described species in Rhinonyssus.

== Species ==
These 36 species belong to the genus Rhinonyssus:

- Rhinonyssus afribyx Fain, 1956
- Rhinonyssus alberti Strandtmann, 1956
- Rhinonyssus apus Fain, 1957
- Rhinonyssus belenopteri Fain, 1964
- Rhinonyssus bregetovae Butenko, 1974
- Rhinonyssus caledonicus Hirst, 1921
- Rhinonyssus chettusiae Butenko, 1973
- Rhinonyssus clangulae Butenko & Stanyukovich, 2001
- Rhinonyssus colymbicola Fain & Bafort, 1963
- Rhinonyssus coniventris Trouessart, 1894
- Rhinonyssus derojasi Dimov, 2020
- Rhinonyssus dobromiri Dimov & Spicer, 2013
- Rhinonyssus echinipes Hirst, 1921
- Rhinonyssus himantopus Strandtmann, 1951
- Rhinonyssus kadrae Dimov, 2013
- Rhinonyssus karelinae Dimov, 2020
- Rhinonyssus levinseni (Tragardh, 1904)
- Rhinonyssus marilae Butenko & Stanyukovich, 2001
- Rhinonyssus mileni Dimov, 2020
- Rhinonyssus minutus Fain, 1972
- Rhinonyssus neglectus Hirst, 1921
- Rhinonyssus pluvialis Fain & Johnston, 1966
- Rhinonyssus podicipedus Feider & Mironescu, 1972
- Rhinonyssus podilymbi Pence, 1972
- Rhinonyssus poliocephali Fain, 1956
- Rhinonyssus polystictae Butenko, 1984
- Rhinonyssus rhinolethrum (Trouessart, 1895)
- Rhinonyssus shcherbininae Butenko, 1984
- Rhinonyssus sixli Dimov, 2020
- Rhinonyssus sphenisci Fain & Hyland, 1963
- Rhinonyssus spinactitis Dusbabek, 1969
- Rhinonyssus strandtmanni Fain & Johnston, 1966
- Rhinonyssus tringae Fain, 1963
- Rhinonyssus vanellochettusiae Butenko, 1984
- Rhinonyssus vanellus Fain, 1972
- Rhinonyssus waterstoni Hirst, 1921
