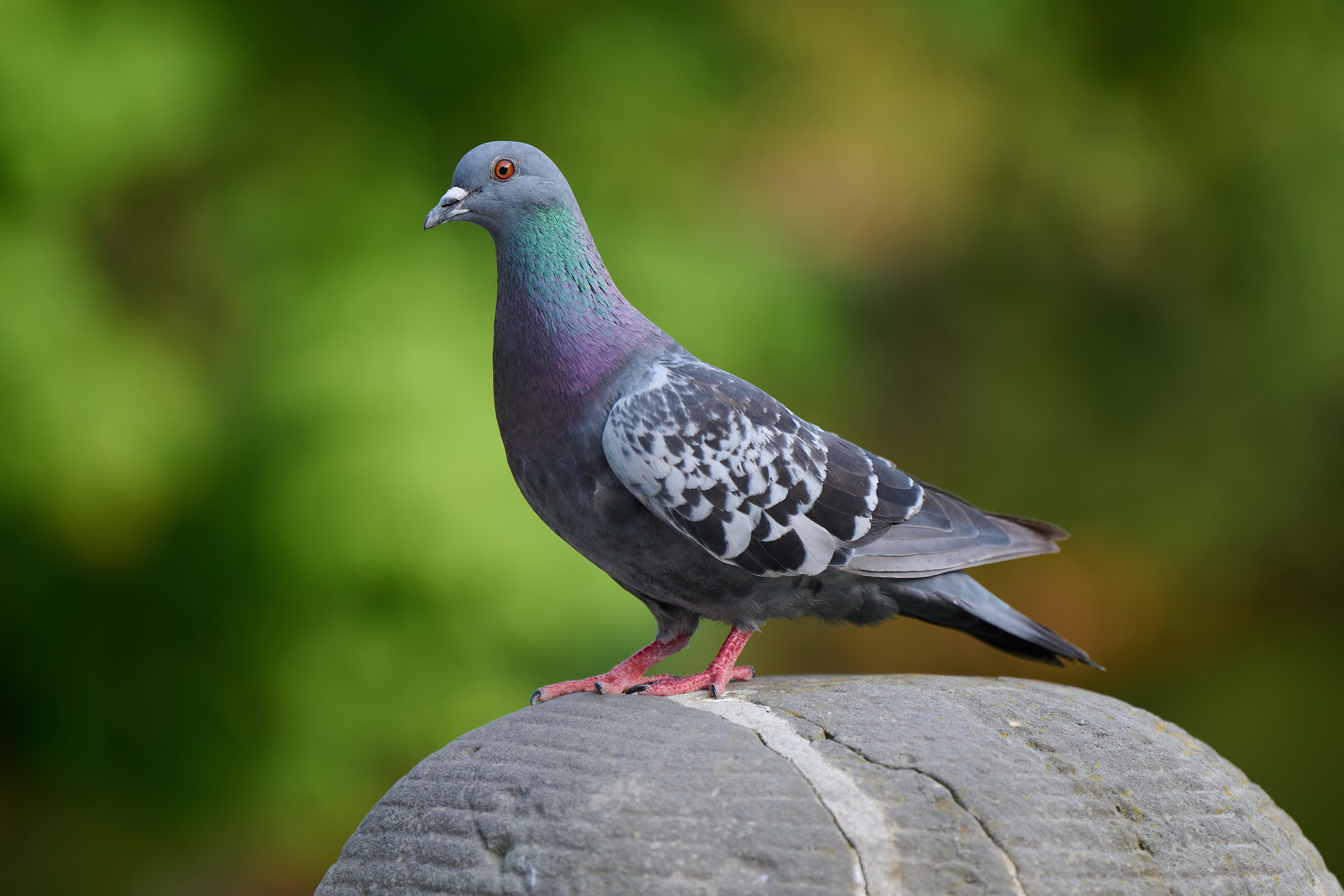
- In Warsaw, Poland

Conservation status
- Least Concern (IUCN 3.1)

Scientific classification
- Kingdom: Animalia
- Phylum: Chordata
- Class: Aves
- Order: Columbiformes
- Family: Columbidae
- Genus: Columba
- Species: C. livia
- Population: Feral pigeon
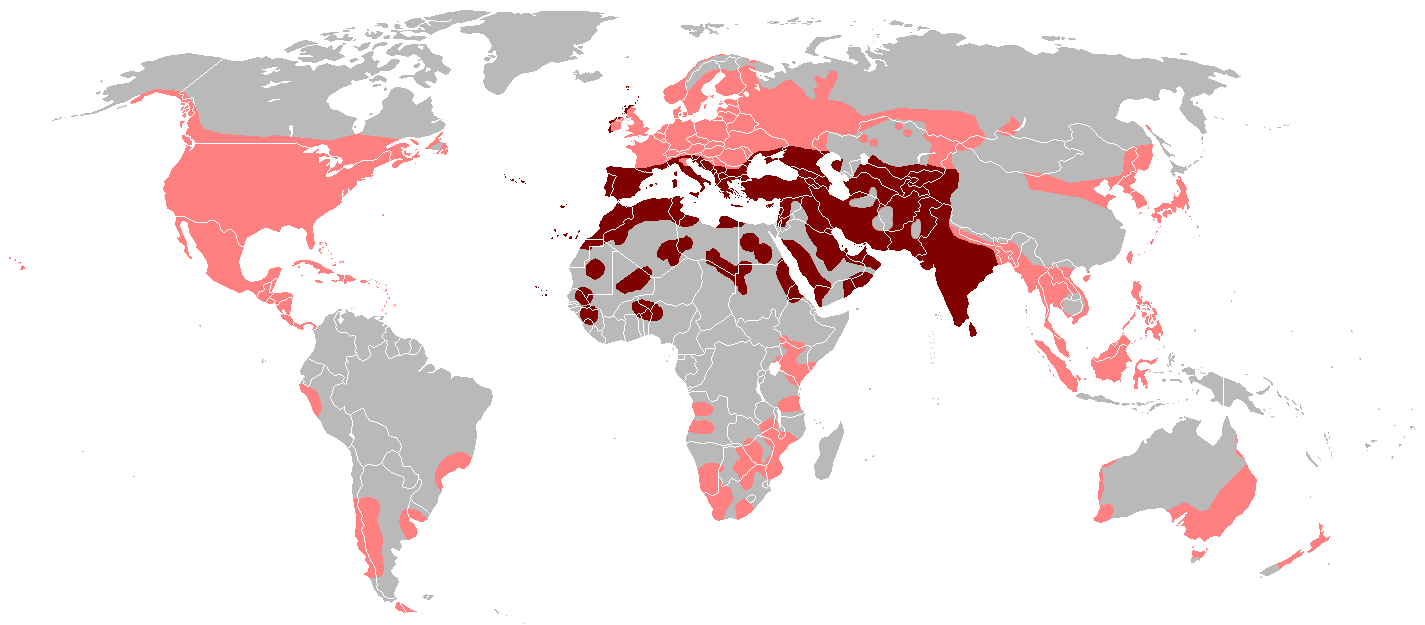
- approximate native range introduced non-native populations

= Feral pigeon =

Domestic pigeons living outside human care

Feral pigeons are birds derived from domesticated populations of the rock dove (Columba livia), descendants that have escaped and are living independently from (and often unwanted by) humans. They are sometimes given the scientific names "Columba livia domestica" or "C. l. urbana", but neither of these subspecific names is accepted by any of the ornithological authorities like the IOC World Bird List or BirdLife International. They are also called city doves, city pigeons, or street pigeons, and (locally, in Britain) skemmies (sing. skemmy). Wild rock doves, domestic pigeons, and feral pigeons are all the same species and will readily interbreed. Many domestic birds have been lost, escaped or been released over the years, and these gave rise to populations of feral pigeons.

Feral pigeons inhabit man-made structures such as buildings as a substitute for cliffs and other rock formations. Their domestic ancestry predisposed them to living near humans, and they subsequently became adapted to urban life, being abundant in towns and cities throughout much of the world. They are often described as a public nuisance, being a potential reservoir of disease and cause of property damage, through their habits and numbers. Many authorities and citizens consider them to be pests and an invasive species, often disparagingly referred to as "rats with wings". Actions are taken in many municipalities to lower their numbers or completely eradicate them.

== Description ==
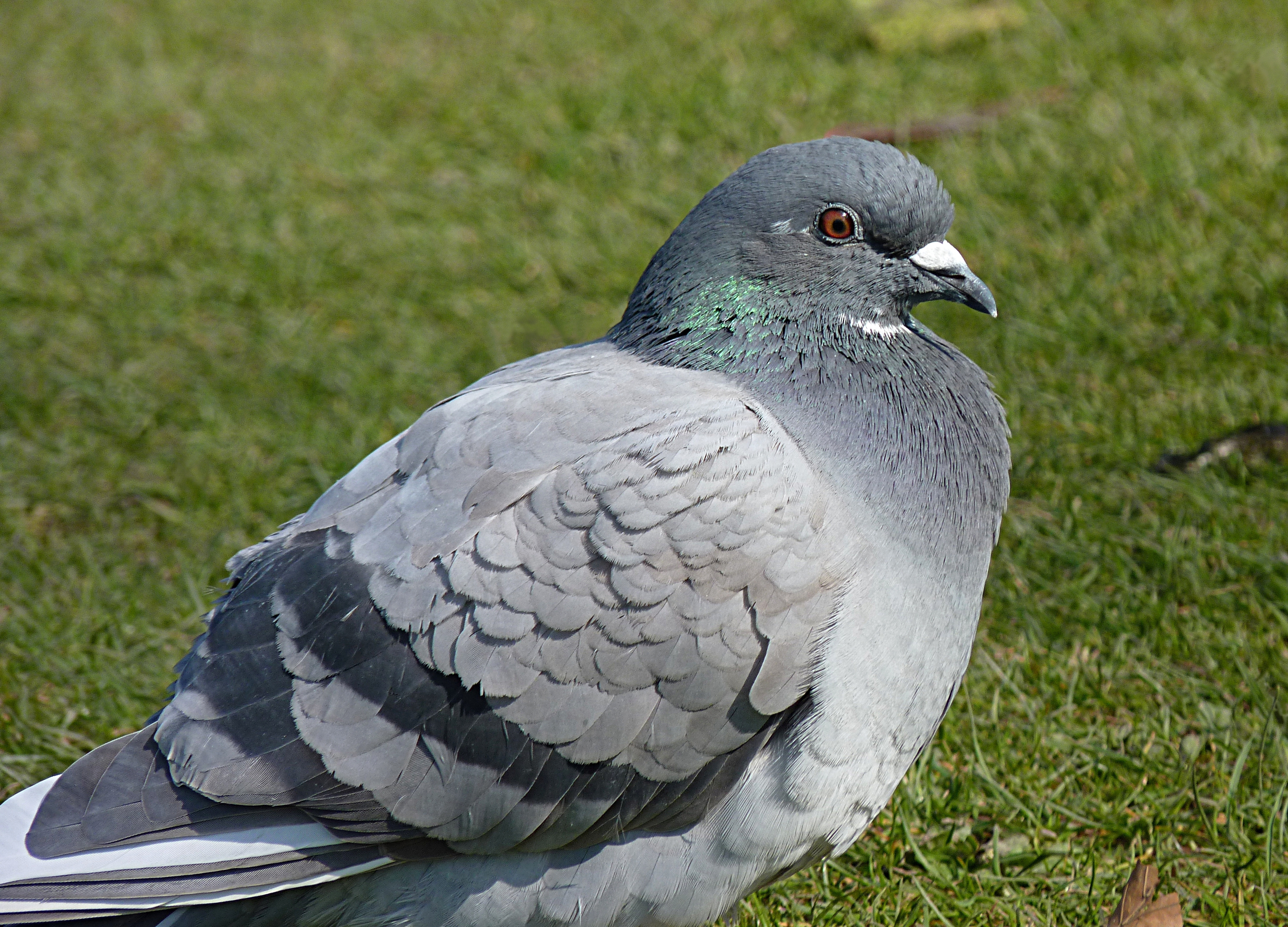
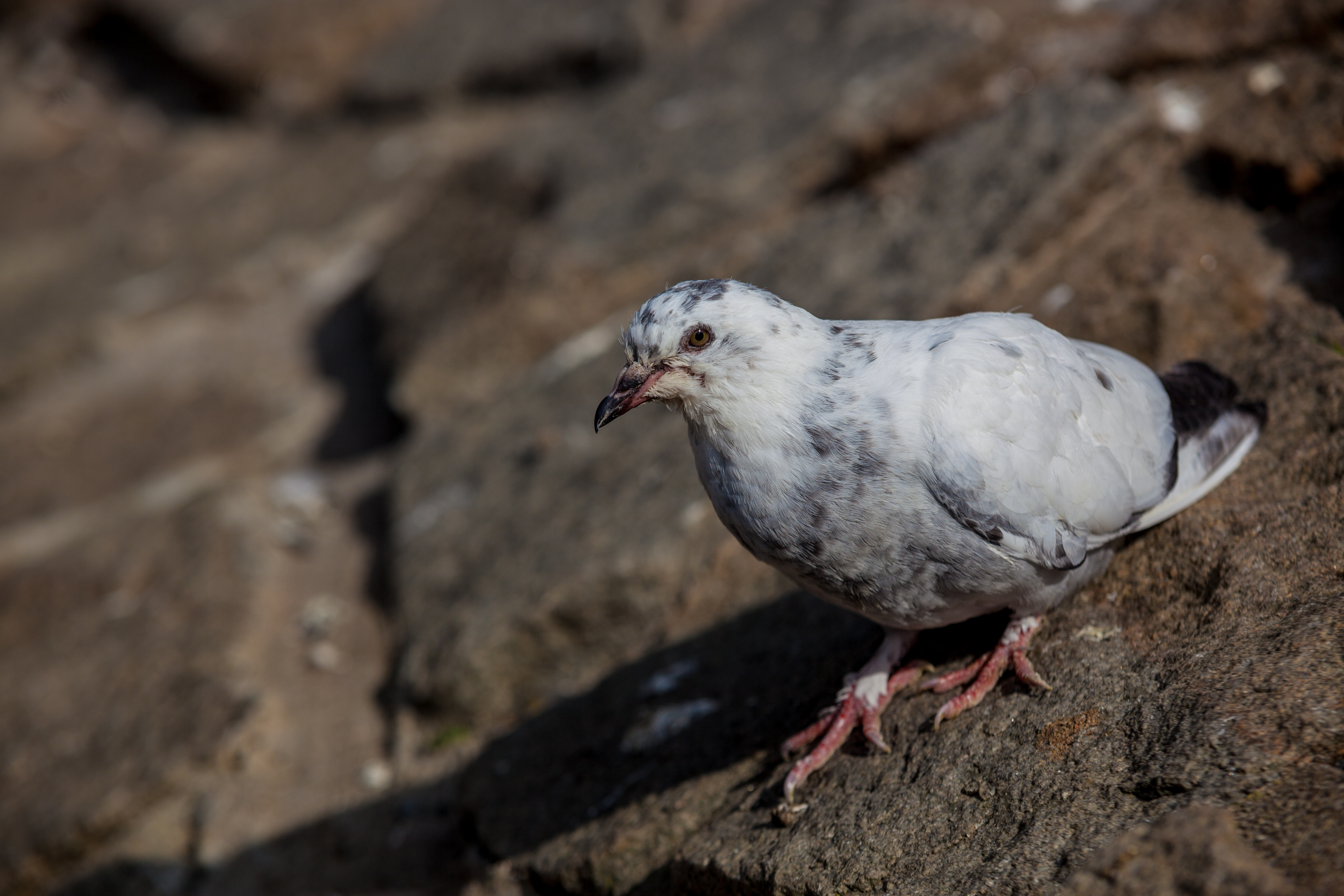
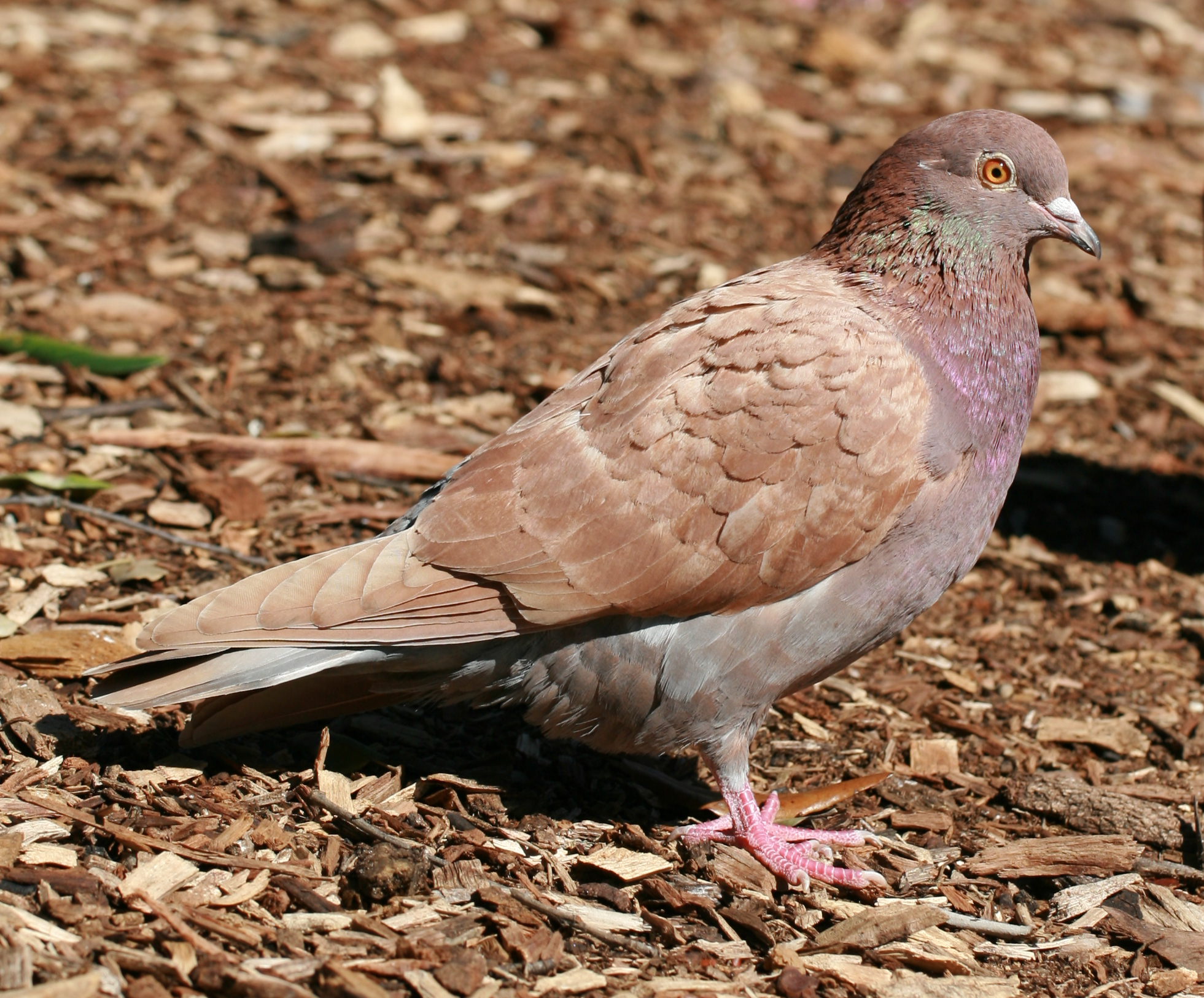
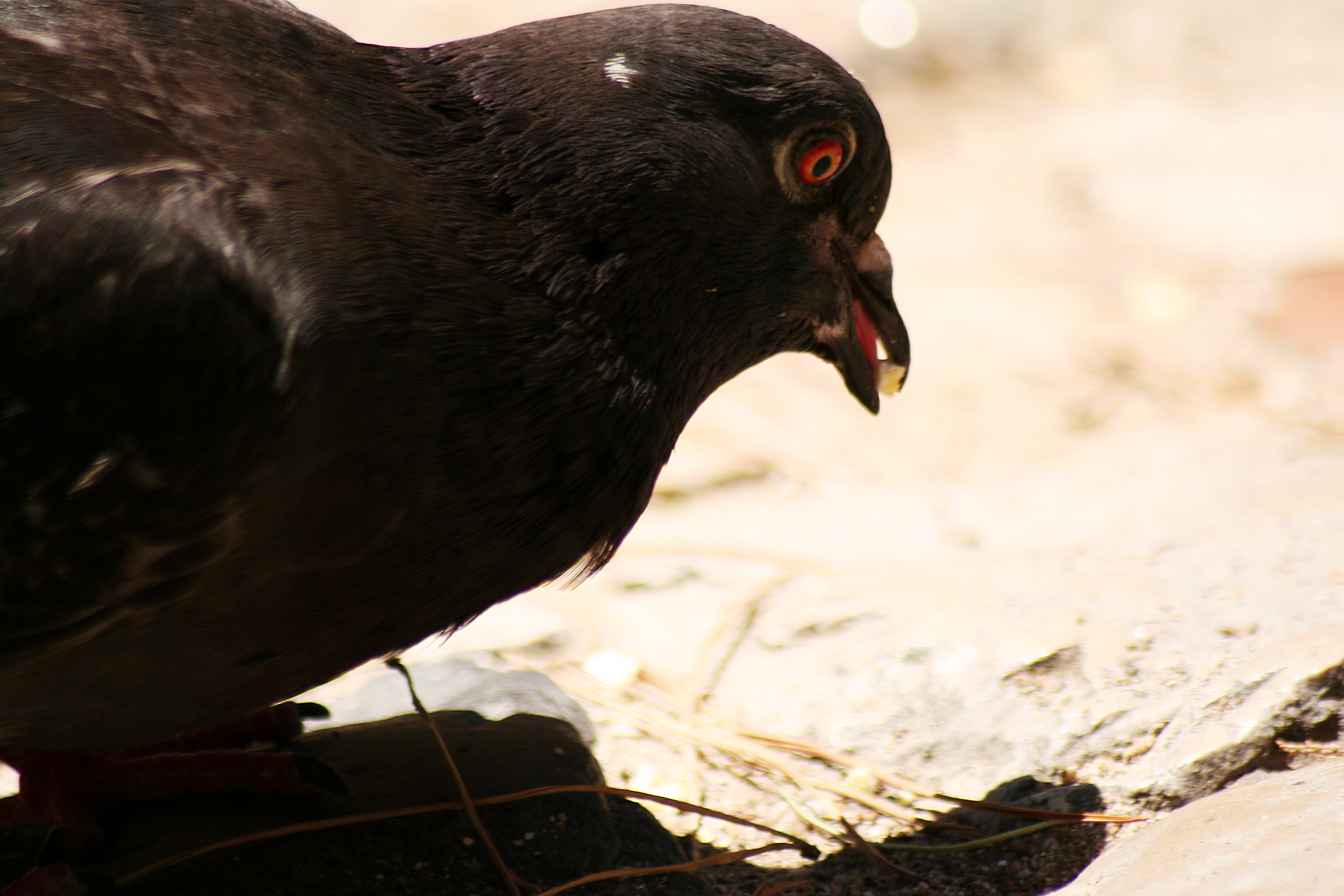
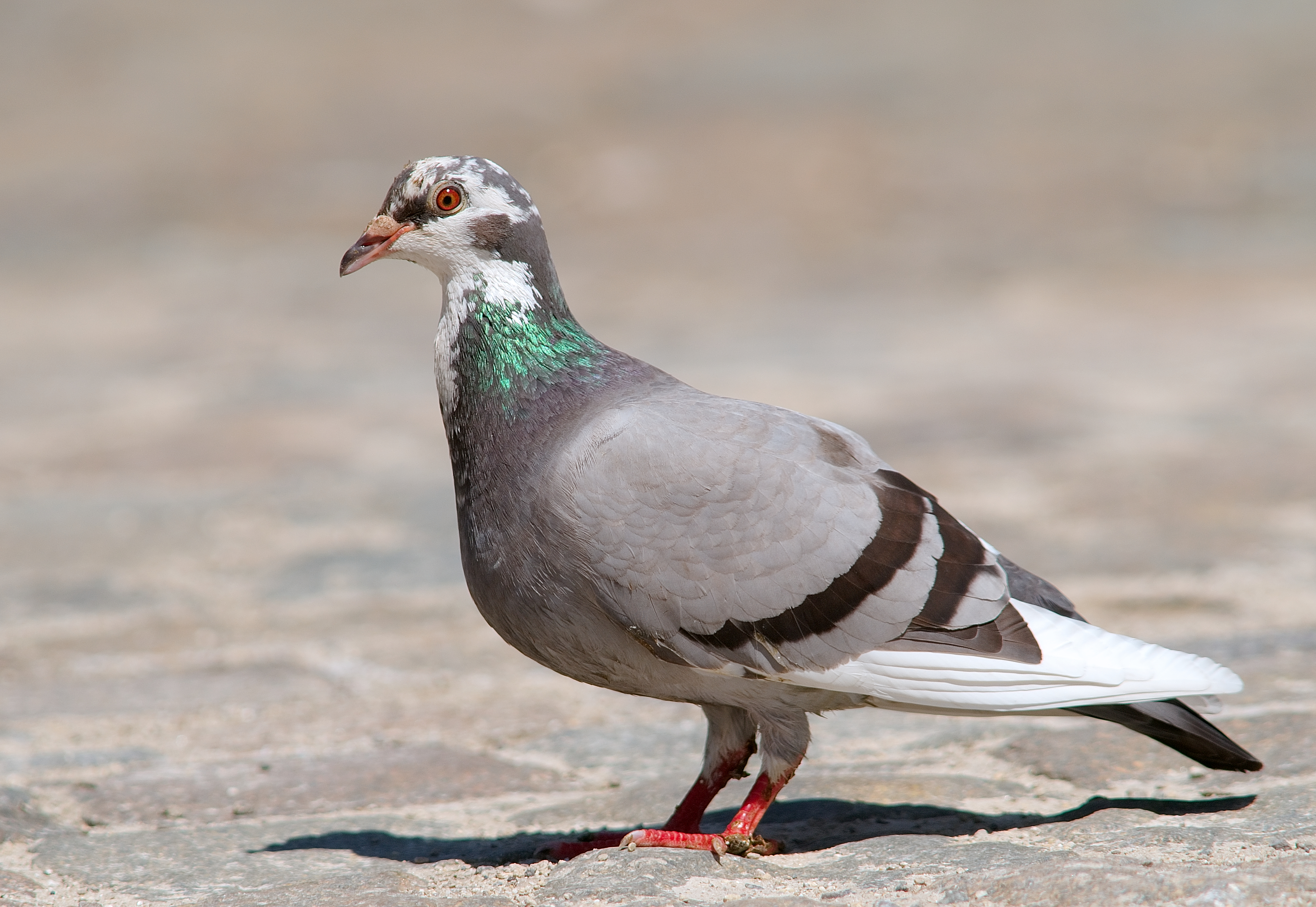
Different feather colourations commonly found in feral pigeons. From the top left, clockwise: blue, white, pied, black, brown.

Feral pigeons are essentially the same size and shape as the original, wild rock dove, but often display far greater variation in colour and pattern than their wild ancestors owing to domestic ancestors. Their conformity to the wild phenotype's shape and size is considered to be the result of natural selection acting upon the population of now free-living birds, shifting the population closer to the form of their distant, wild ancestor. Local selective pressures have been suggested to explain the geographical variation across feral pigeons in the United States.

The blue-barred pattern which the original wild rock dove displays is generally less common in more urban areas. Pigeons feathers have two types of melanin (pigment) – eumelanin and pheomelanin. A study of melanin in the feathers of both wild rock and domestic pigeons, of different colouration types and known genetic background, measured the concentration, distribution and proportions of eumelanin and pheomelanin and found that gene mutations affecting the distribution, amounts and proportions of pigments accounted for the greater variation of colouration in domesticated birds than in their wild relations. Eumelanin generally causes grey or black colours, while pheomelanin results in a reddish-brown colour. Other shades of brown may be produced through different combinations and concentrations of the two colours. Urban pigeons tend to have darker plumage than those in more rural areas. Darker birds may be better able to store trace metals in their feathers due to their higher concentrations of melanin, which may help mitigate the negative effects of the metals, the concentrations of which are typically higher in urban areas.

Compared to their wild relatives, feral pigeons are unafraid of humans due to their long history of domestication, and are extremely trusting and tolerant of people.

The avoidance of mating between related individuals is ordinarily regarded as adaptive since it decreases the likelihood of inbreeding depression in progeny that can be caused by the expression of deleterious recessive alleles. However in feral pigeons it was found that despite detectable inbreeding depression, pairwise relatedness between mates was significantly greater than it was between nonmates. This suggests that mating with close kin provides inclusive fitness benefits that outweigh the costs of inbreeding depression.

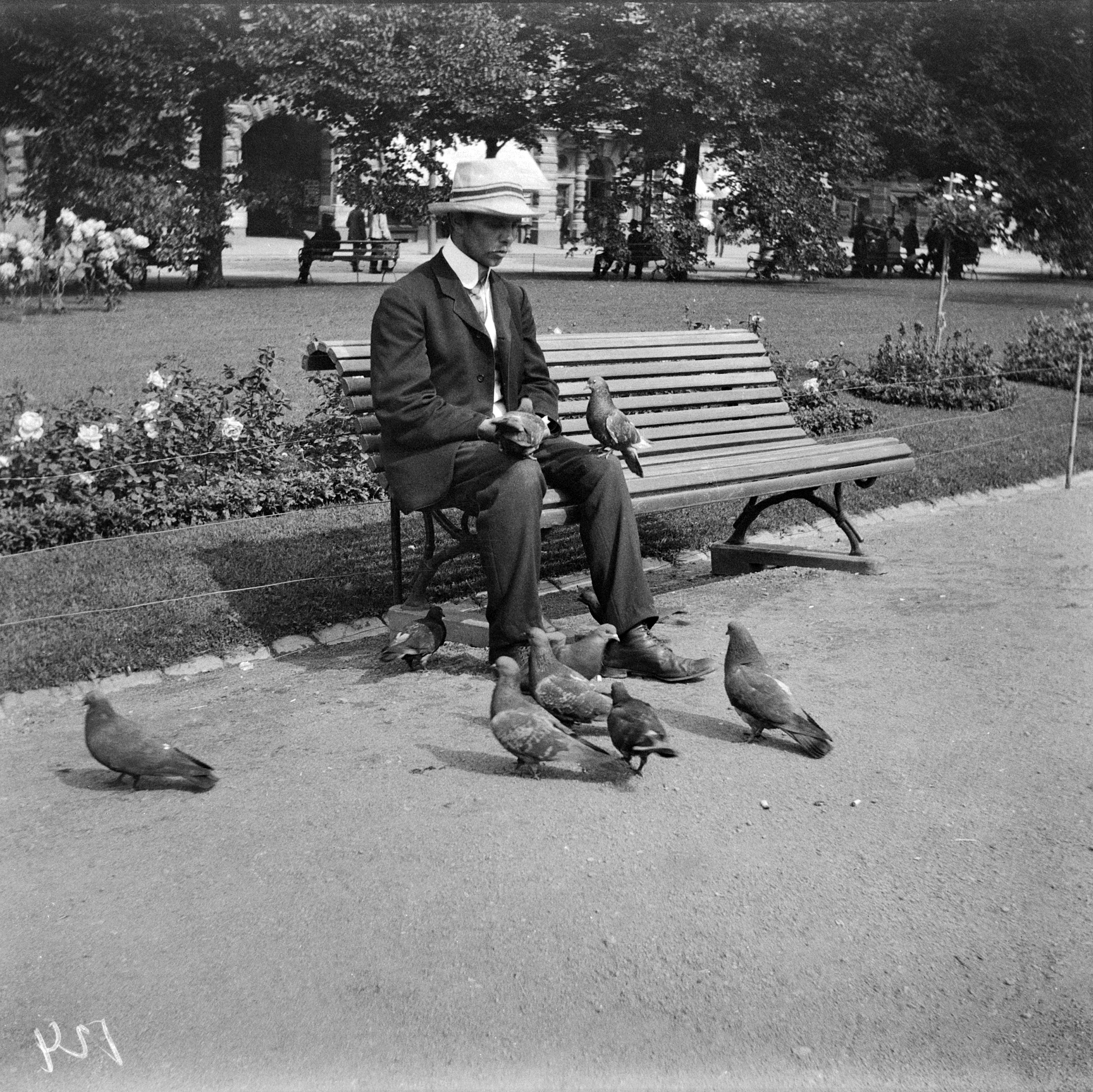
A man feeding feral pigeons at Esplanadi, Helsinki, in 1921

Studies of feral pigeons in a semi-rural part of Kansas found that their diet includes the following: 92% maize, 3.2% oats, 3.7% cherry, along with small amounts of knotweed, elm, poison ivy and barley. They have been observed to eat insects and spiders. Pigeons tend to congregate in large, dense flocks when feeding on discarded food. In cities they typically resort to scavenging human garbage, as unprocessed grain may be impossible to find. Pigeon groups typically consist of producers, which locate and obtain food, and scroungers, which feed on food obtained by the producers. Generally, groups of pigeons contain a greater proportion of scroungers than producers. Feral pigeons can be seen eating grass seeds and berries in parks and gardens in the spring, but plentiful sources exist throughout the year from scavenging (e.g., food remnants left inside of dropped fast food cartons, in the form of popcorn, cake, peanuts, bread and currants) Food is also procured from waste bins. Bird feeders, often tourists or residents who feed pigeons, do so for reasons such as empathy, fun, tradition and as a means for social interaction.

=== Diseases ===
Feral pigeons can be reservoirs and vectors of some human and livestock diseases, such as salmonellosis and tuberculosis. However, it is rare that a pigeon will transmit a disease to humans due to their immune system. Although feral pigeons pose sporadic health risks to humans, the risk is low, even for humans involved in occupations that bring them into close contact with nesting sites. Analysis revealed that feral pigeons harbored a total of 60 different human pathogenic organisms. Five pathogens were viruses, nine were bacteria, 45 were fungi, and one was a protozoan. However, only five pathogens were routinely transmitted to humans.

Pigeons often suffer injuries to their legs and feet due to contact with foreign objects in their environment, particularly hair or string, which gets wrapped around their legs and cuts off the blood supply, in some cases resulting in autoamputation.

==== Parasites ====
Pigeons may harbour a diverse parasite fauna. They often host the intestinal helminths (parasitic worms) Capillaria columbae and Ascaridia columbae. Their ectoparasites include the ischnoceran lice Columbicola columbae, Campanulotes bidentatus compar, the amblyceran lice Bonomiella columbae, Hohorstiella lata, Colpocephalum turbinatum, the mites Tinaminyssus melloi, Dermanyssus gallinae, Dermoglyphus columbae, Falculifer rostratus and Diplaegidia columbae. The hippoboscid fly Pseudolynchia canariensis is a typical blood-sucking ectoparasite of pigeons in tropical and subtropical regions. The avian mites can infest human habitation and bite humans, a condition known as gamasoidosis. However, cases of them infesting mammals is relatively rare.

==== Pathogens ====
Avian influenza (bird flu) has been extensively studied in pigeons. Studies have shown that adult pigeons are not clinically susceptible to nor carry H5N1, and that they do not transmit the virus to poultry. Other studies have presented evidence of clinical signs and neurological lesions resulting from infection but found that the pigeons did not transmit the disease to poultry reared in direct contact with them. Pigeons were found to be "resistant or minimally susceptible" to other strains of avian influenza, such as the H7N7. Three studies since the late 1990s were performed by the US Agriculture Department's Southeast Poultry Research Laboratory in Athens, Georgia, according to the center's director, David Swayne. The lab has been working on bird flu since the 1970s. In one experiment, researchers squirted into pigeons' mouths liquid drops that contained the highly pathogenic H5N1 virus from a Hong Kong sample. The birds received 100 to 1,000 times the concentration that wild birds would encounter in nature. "We couldn't infect the pigeons", Swayne said. "So that's good news."

Chlamydophila psittaci is endemic among pigeons and causes psittacosis in humans. It is generally transmitted from handling pigeons or their droppings (more commonly the latter). Psittacosis is a serious disease but rarely fatal (less than 1%).

Pigeons are also important vectors for various species of the bacteria Salmonella, which causes diseases such as salmonellosis and paratyphoid fever. There were single case incidences for transmission of Salmonella enterica.

Pigeons are not a major concern in the spread of West Nile virus: though they can contract it, they apparently do not transmit it to humans.

Avian paramyxovirus (PMV) is carried by pigeons and is a serious affliction in birds.

== Impact ==
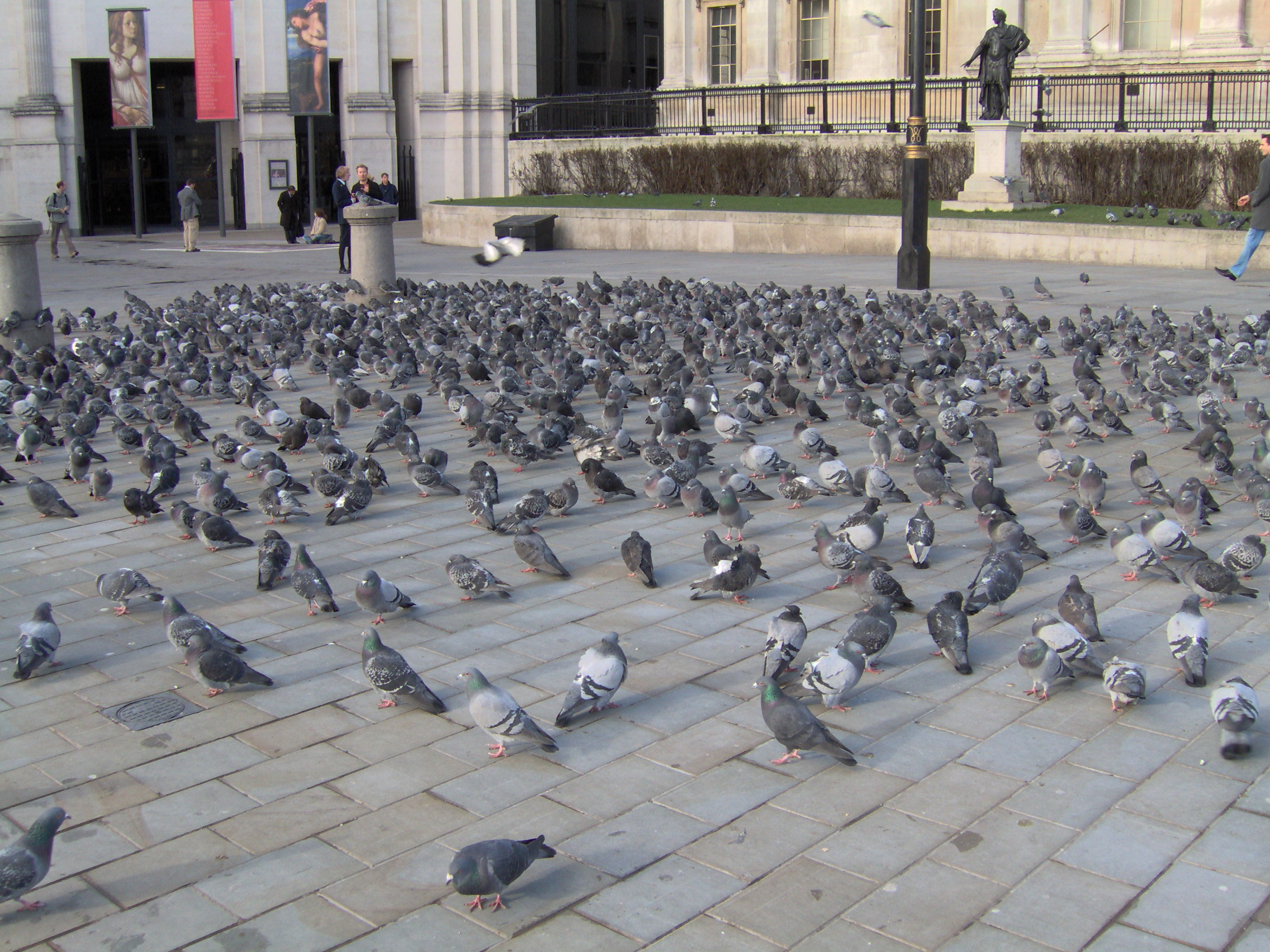
A flock of feral pigeons at rest in Trafalgar Square, London

Feral pigeons often only have small populations within cities relative to the number of humans. For example, the breeding population of feral pigeons in Sheffield, England, in summer 2005 was estimated at 12,130 individuals (95% confidence interval 7,757–18,970), in a city with a human population of about 500,000. Despite this, feral pigeons usually reach their highest densities in the central portions of cities, so they are frequently encountered by people, which may lead to conflict.

Pigeons can compete with native birds for nest sites, which could become a conservation issue for seabirds.

The scarcity of the wild rock dove is largely due to interbreeding with feral birds.

=== Faeces ===
Healthy, well-fed pigeons excrete faeces that are composed largely of a brown to greenish-brown mass with a white cap; the white cap is composed of uric acid crystals, with some of the uric acid dissolved within urea that comprises the liquid urine, which is transparent and often absorbed by the mass of solid waste of the faeces, which maintains its shape when the bird is in good health. The colour of the resultant faecal matter is helpful in diagnosing the condition of the bird; droppings which appear dull yellow are indicative of starvation, especially if watery; green may be a sign of liver disease due to an abundance of excreted biliverdin, bright green being an abundance of passed bile implying bowel problems or not having eaten recently; and red-brown showing kidney disease.

Contact with pigeon droppings poses a minor risk of contracting histoplasmosis, cryptococcosis and psittacosis. Pigeon faeces has been implicated as a "contributing factor" of a cryptococcus infection leading to the death of a child.

Feral pigeon faeces cause substantial economic losses from property damage, often considered to be from their corrosive droppings damaging stone edifices and metal structures.

== Protection status ==
In the United Kingdom, pigeons are covered under the "General Licences" and can be humanely culled by the land owner or their agent for a variety of reasons including spread of human disease. It is illegal to kill/destroy nests for any reason other than those listed under the general licences.

In the U.S., the Migratory Bird Treaty Act of 1918, which protects native birds, does not apply to feral pigeons, common starlings or house sparrows, because they are introduced species. It is usually legal to kill feral pigeons in the United States; methods such as poisons may be regulated, however. Pigeons are labeled an invasive species in North America by the USDA.

In India, pigeons are protected under Section 428 and Section 429 of the Indian Penal Code. Wild pigeons are further protected under the Wildlife Protection Act, 1972.

== Control methods ==
=== Predators ===
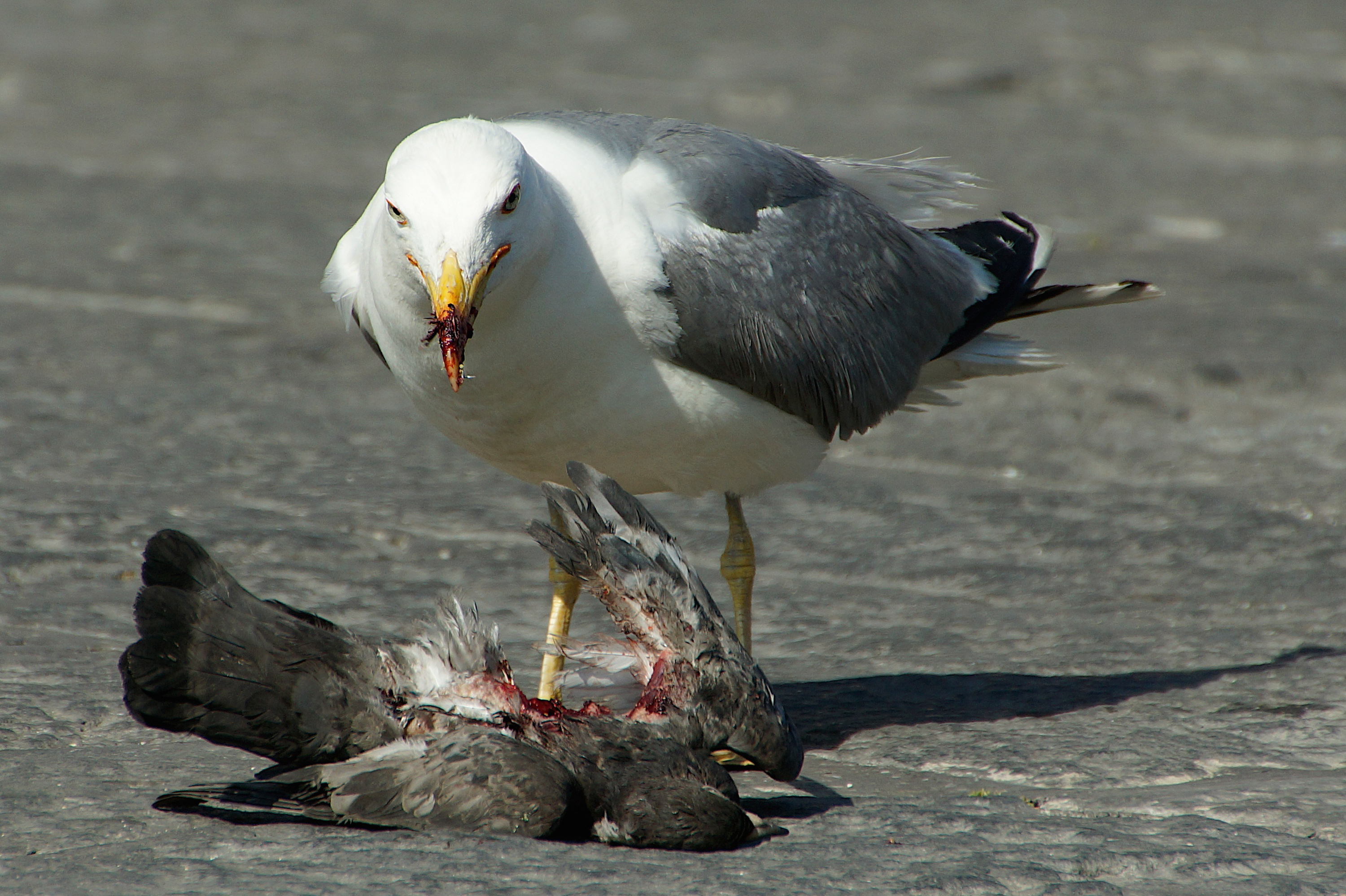
A yellow-legged gull (Larus michahellis) eating a feral pigeon it has killed in Naples, Italy

Peregrine falcons Falco peregrinus, which are also originally cliff dwellers, have also adapted to the skyscrapers of large cities and often feed exclusively on feral pigeons. Some cities actively encourage this through falcon breeding programs. Projects include the Unibase Falcon Project and the Victorian Peregrine Project. Other species of falcons have also been observed to hunt down ferals.

Other predators of the pigeon have been recorded, including Eurasian sparrowhawks (Accipiter nisus), crows (Corvus spp.), and large gulls (Larus spp.). Larger birds of prey occasionally take advantage of these pigeons as well. Goshawks have been known to specialize on feral pigeons even outside of urban settings. In New York City, the abundance of feral pigeons (and other small animals) has created such a conducive environment for predators that the red-tailed hawk has begun to return in very small numbers, including the notable Pale Male.

Other common predators of feral pigeons in North America are raccoons, opossums, great horned owls, and eastern screech owls. The birds that prey on pigeons in North America can range in size from American kestrels to golden eagles.

In London, the population of great white pelicans at St. James's Park has also been recorded killing and consuming pigeons even when alternative food sources are available. In cities in Western Europe, European herring gulls may occasionally hunt and consume feral pigeons in addition to other birds and small mammals.

Despite their importance in the diet of urban predatory birds, feral pigeons are known to transmit several diseases to their consumers, as they may be reservoirs of several avian diseases, often subclinically. Raptors may contract West Nile Virus through consumption of infected bird species, such as crows, house sparrows, and pigeons. Trichomoniasis, frounce, or canker is a significant disease in raptors both captive and wild-living. Symptoms include caseous plaques in and around the oropharynx, and lesions may be found in the lungs, air sacs, sinuses, ear canal and kidneys. The lesions may progress into severe necroses, at least of the upper digestive tract. Trich has been found to be resistant to several drug treatments, and it is thought that "preventive treatments" that use insufficient dosages may be one of the causes. These diseases may prove to be fatal to the raptors; Columbid Herpesvirus-1 has a near 100% mortality rate in raptors.

=== Artificial control ===
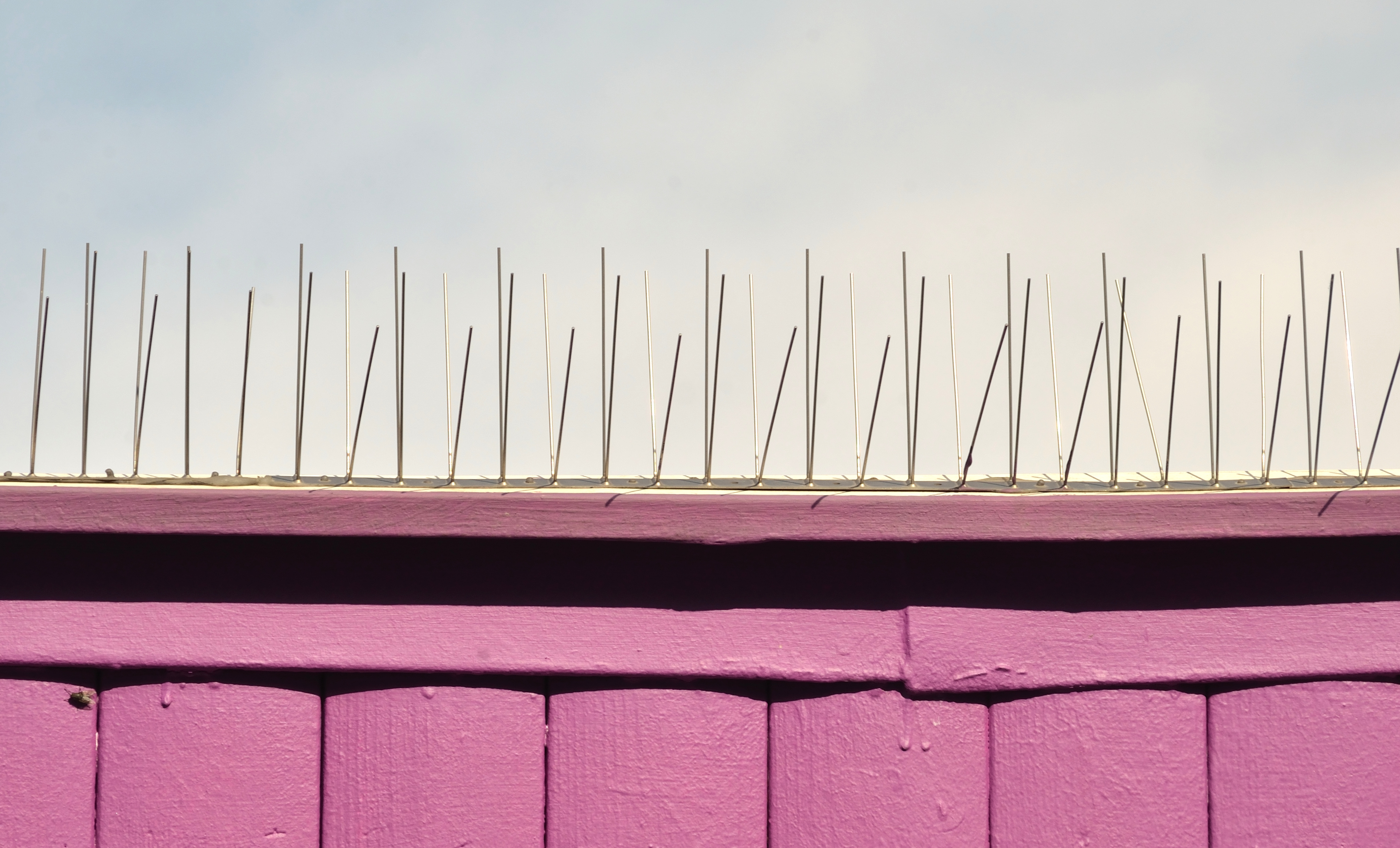
Many places where feral pigeons could land are covered with spikes.

Deterrence methods include bird spikes and the recently introduced optical gel deterrent.

==== Food supply reduction ====
A more effective tactic to reduce the number of feral pigeons is deprivation. Cities around the world have discovered that not feeding their local birds results in a steady population decrease in only a few years. As scavengers, pigeons will still pick at garbage bags containing discarded food or at leftovers carelessly dropped on the ground, but securely disposing of foodstuffs will greatly reduce scavenger populations. Feeding of pigeons is banned in parts of Venice, Italy.

Long-term reduction of feral pigeon populations can be achieved by restricting food supply, which in turn involves legislation and litter (garbage) control. Some cities have deliberately established favourable nesting places for pigeons, nesting places that can easily be reached by city workers who regularly remove eggs, thereby limiting their reproductive success. In addition, pigeon populations may be reduced by bird control systems that successfully reduce nesting sites.

==== Avian contraceptives ====
In 1998, in response to conservation groups and the public interest, the National Wildlife Research Center (NWRC), a USDA/APHIS laboratory in Fort Collins, Colorado, started work on nicarbazin, a promising compound for avian contraception. Originally developed for use in resident Canada geese, nicarbazin was introduced for use as a contraceptive for feral pigeons in 2007.

The active ingredient, nicarbazin, interferes with the viability of eggs by binding the ZP-3 sperm receptor site in the egg. This unique contraceptive action is non-hormonal and fully reversible.

Registered by the EPA as a pesticide (EPA Reg. No. 80224-1), "OvoControl P", brand of nicarbazin, is increasingly used in urban areas and industrial sites to control pigeon populations. Declared safe and humane, the new technology is environmentally benign and does not represent a secondary toxicity hazard to raptors or scavengers.

Avian contraception has the support of a range of animal welfare groups including the Humane Society of the United States, the American Society for the Prevention of Cruelty to Animals and People for the Ethical Treatment of Animals. Avian contraceptives are also perceived by some civilians as an acceptable method for population control, over other methods such as prohibition to feeding or extermination.

==== Dummy egg nesting ====
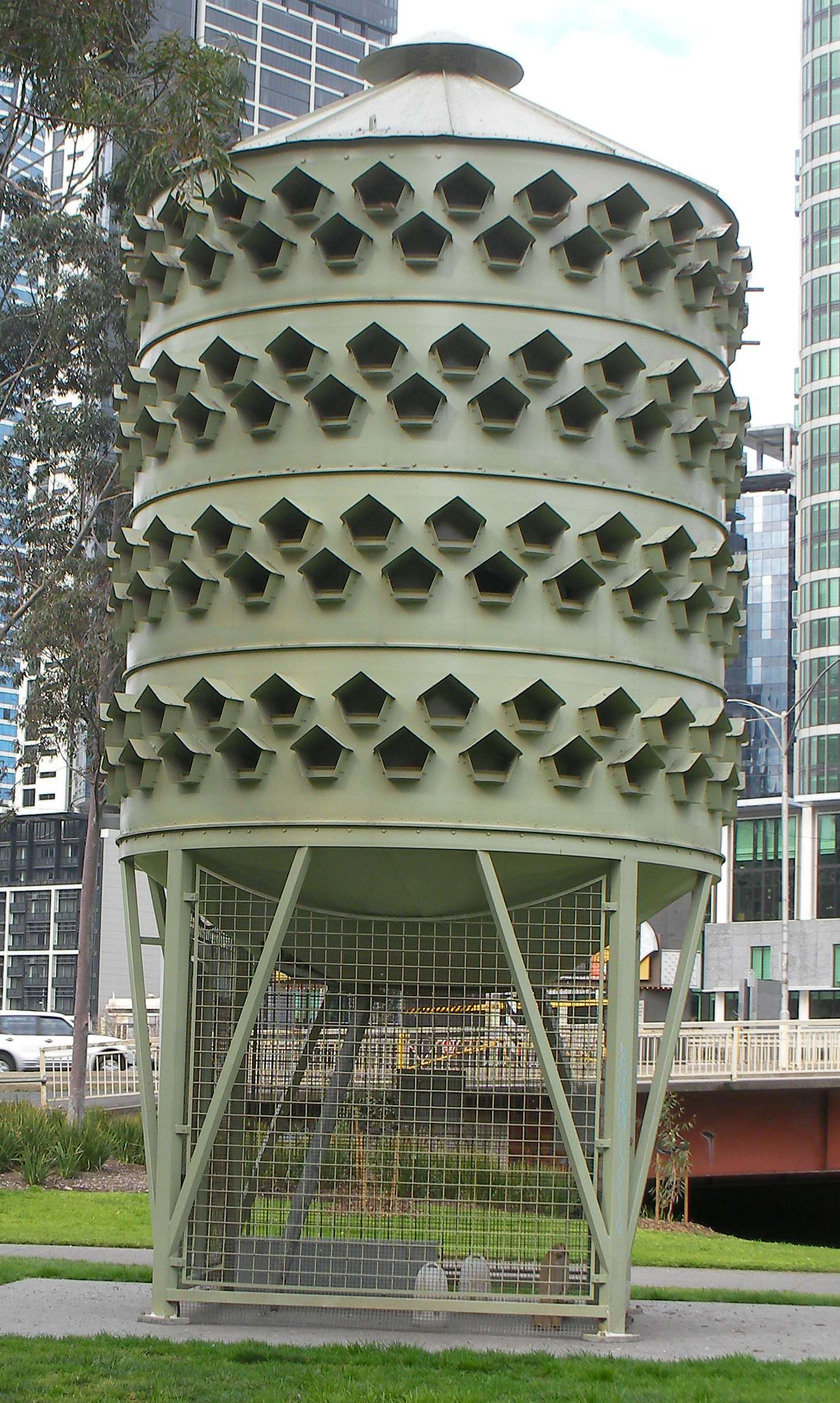
Large pigeon trap at Batman Park, Melbourne. Designed specifically to encourage nesting and allow removal of fertilised eggs to prevent population growth, it was a landmark in its own right before its removal, for lack of success, around 2015.

When eggs are removed in artificial pigeon houses, the interval between reproductive attempts is strongly reduced, which reduces the efficiency of the method. Dummy egg nesting programs have therefore been tested in some cities with mixed results. There, the eggs are removed and replaced with dummy eggs. The real eggs are then destroyed. One such structure, in Batman Park in Melbourne, Australia, was unsuccessful in attracting pigeons and has since been removed. The loft used in Melbourne was on stilts, with a cage door allowing access from beneath for accessing the structure at night when the pigeons are asleep.

==== Poison ====
Due to their non-selective nature, most avian poisons have been banned. In the United States market, only 4-aminopyridine (Avitrol) and DRC-1339 remain registered by EPA. DRC-1339 is limited to USDA use only, while 4-AP is a restricted-use pesticide, for use only by licensed applicators.

The use of poisons has been proven to be fairly ineffective, however, as pigeons can breed very quickly, and their numbers are determined by how much food is available; that is, they breed more often when more food is provided to them. When pigeons are poisoned, surviving birds do not leave the area. On the contrary, they are left with more food per bird than before. This attracts pigeons from outside areas as well as encouraging more breeding, and populations are re-established quickly. An additional problem with poisoning is that it also kills pigeon predators. Due to this, in cities with peregrine falcon programs it is typically illegal to poison pigeons.

== Monitoring pigeon population ==
Estimating the population size of pigeons is necessary for monitoring and control programs of pigeons in parks and other urban areas. The methods used for estimating populations sizes are:

- Stratified grids: This method consists in dividing the area where pigeons occur in 500x500m squares. 34% of the squares are selected randomly and pigeons are counted in a 5 meters radius for 5 minutes.
- Point-counts: standing in the center of a park, the observer makes a 360 degree turn while counting individuals with a manual mechanical counter in a radius of approximately 50m, limited by the streets and buildings that surround the park.
- Panoramas: taking 360 panoramic photographs, while standing at the center of the park, and using software to place a number above the counted pigeon in the panoramic photograph. This method has been proven the most effective of all.

== City squares famous for pigeons ==
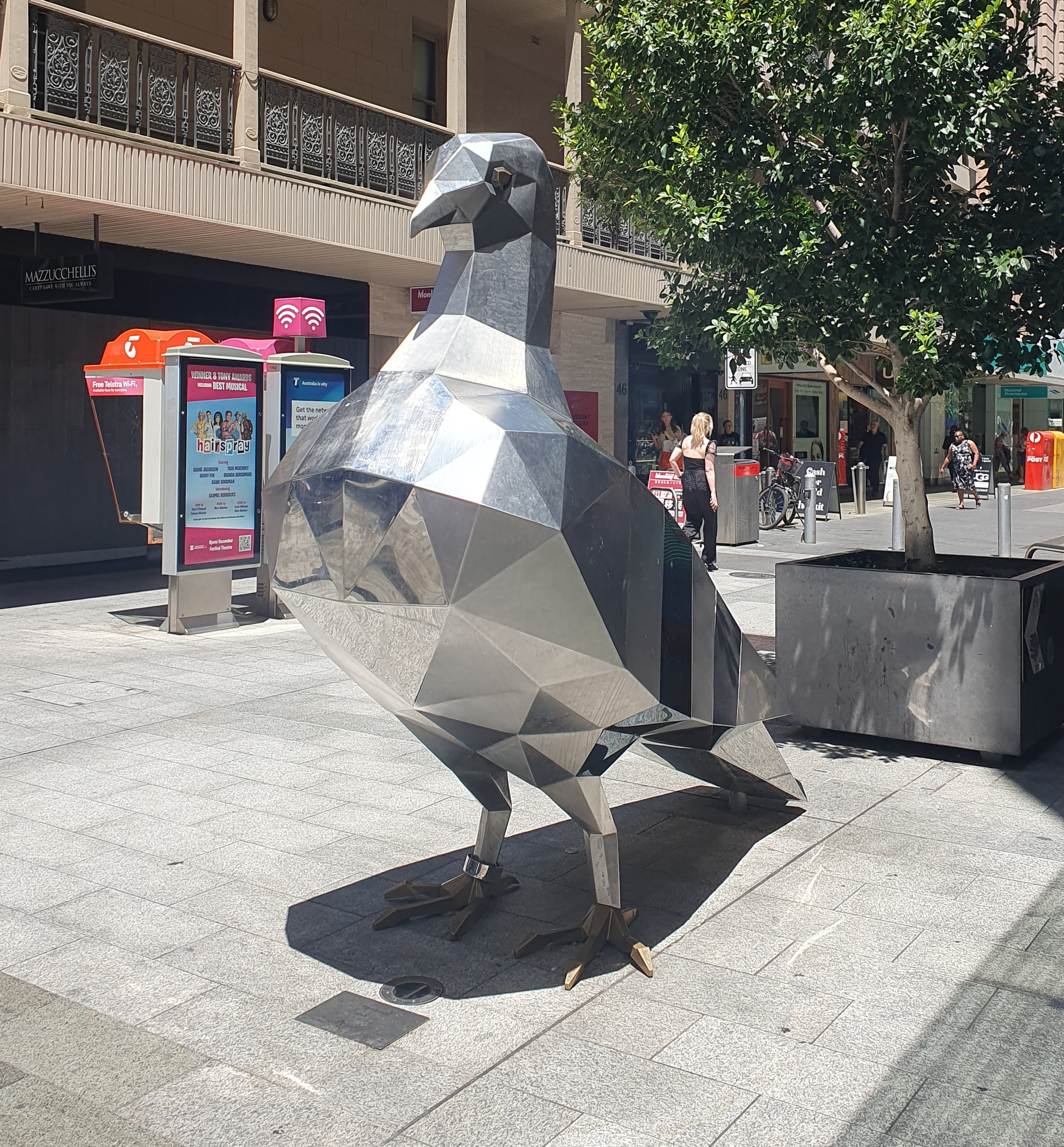
Pigeon by artist Paul Sloan at Rundle Mall, Adelaide

Many city squares have large pigeon populations, such as Washington Square Park in New York City, George Square in Glasgow, the Piazza San Marco in Venice, Dam Square in Amsterdam, The Gateway of India and Kabutarkhana in Mumbai and (prior to 2000) Trafalgar Square in London.

A 2-metre-tall (6.6 ft) statue of a pigeon by artist Paul Sloan was installed at the Rundle Mall, Adelaide, South Australia, adding to their collection of art installations, including statues of pigs. Sloan intended to "elevate the humble pigeon" with his work titled Pigeon. The mirrored stainless steel statue cost A$174,000. While the installation has been talked up by City of Adelaide Lord Mayor Sandy Verschoor, some locals have responded negatively.

== See also ==
- Bird feeding
- Doves as symbols
- Squab – a young pigeon, typically under four weeks old, or its meat
- Feral chicken
- Feral parrot

== Bibliography ==
- Levi, Wendell (1977). The Pigeon. Sumter, S.C.: Levi Publishing Co, Inc. ISBN 978-0-85390-013-9.
- Johnston, Richard F.; Janiga, Marián (1995). Feral Pigeons. Oxford University Press. ISBN 978-0-19-508409-2.
