= Charadrinyssus =

Scientific classification
- Domain: Eukaryota
- Kingdom: Animalia
- Phylum: Arthropoda
- Subphylum: Chelicerata
- Class: Arachnida
- Order: Mesostigmata
- Family: Rhinonyssidae
- Genus: Charadrinyssus; Butenko, 1984
- Species: C. charadrius

Binomial name
- Charadrinyssus charadrius (Butenko, 1975)

Genus of mites

Charadrinyssus is a genus of mites in the family Rhinonyssidae. This genus has a single species, Charadrinyssus charadrius.
