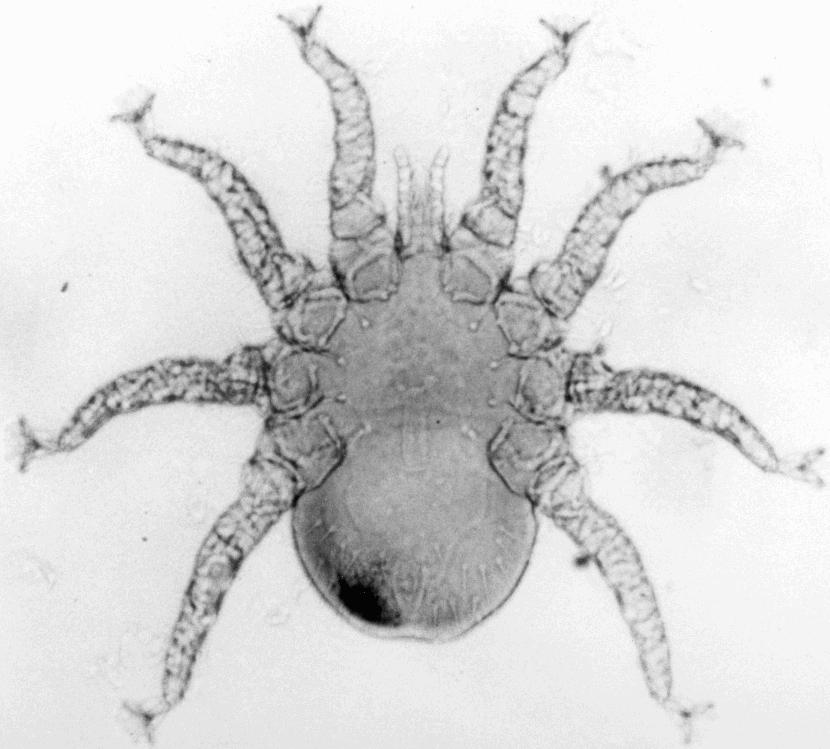
- Adult female Tinaminyssus melloi collected from the nasal cavity of a feral pigeon in Budapest, Hungary

Scientific classification
- Kingdom: Animalia
- Phylum: Arthropoda
- Subphylum: Chelicerata
- Class: Arachnida
- Order: Mesostigmata
- Family: Rhinonyssidae
- Genus: Tinaminyssus; Strandtmann & Wharton, 1958

Synonyms
- Mesonyssus Fain, 1960; Mesonyssoides Fain & Nadchatram, 1962; Mesonyssoides Strandtmann & Clifford, 1962; Psittonyssus Fain, 1963; Falconyssus Fain, 1966

= Tinaminyssus =

Genus of mites

Tinaminyssus is a genus of mites in the family Rhinonyssidae. There are more than 60 described species in Tinaminyssus.

== Species ==
These 68 species belong to the genus Tinaminyssus:

- Tinaminyssus alexfaini (Amaral, 1967)
- Tinaminyssus alisteri (Wilson, 1964)
- Tinaminyssus angustus (Wilson, 1966)
- Tinaminyssus aprosmicti (Domrow, 1964)
- Tinaminyssus baforti (Fain, 1963)
- Tinaminyssus belopolskii (Bregetova, 1950)
- Tinaminyssus bubulci (Zumpt & Till, 1955)
- Tinaminyssus buteonis (Fain, 1956)
- Tinaminyssus camargoi (Amaral, 1962)
- Tinaminyssus carapachibeyus Dusbábek, 1969
- Tinaminyssus castroae (Amaral, 1963)
- Tinaminyssus chiarellii Amaral & Baquer, 1963
- Tinaminyssus columbae (Crossley, 1950)
- Tinaminyssus crypturelli Fain, 1967
- Tinaminyssus cunhai (Amaral, 1963)
- Tinaminyssus daceloae (Domrow, 1965)
- Tinaminyssus egrettae (Butenko, 1984)
- Tinaminyssus elani (Fain, 1966)
- Tinaminyssus epileus (Wilson, 1964)
- Tinaminyssus geopeliae (Fain, 1964)
- Tinaminyssus geotrygoni (Dusbábek, 1969)
- Tinaminyssus gerschi (Feider & Mironescu, 1974)
- Tinaminyssus gourae (Wilson, 1964)
- Tinaminyssus halcyonus (Domrow, 1965)
- Tinaminyssus hirtus (Wilson, 1966)
- Tinaminyssus ixobrychi (Fain, 1956)
- Tinaminyssus ixoreus (Strandtmann & Clifford, 1962)
- Tinaminyssus juxtamelloi Pence & Canaris, 1976
- Tinaminyssus kakatuae (Domrow, 1964)
- Tinaminyssus macropygiae (Wilson, 1966)
- Tinaminyssus malayi (Fain & Nadchatram, 1962)
- Tinaminyssus marciae (Amaral, 1966)
- Tinaminyssus megaloprepiae Domrow, 1969
- Tinaminyssus melloi (Castro, 1948)
- Tinaminyssus metropeliae (Fain, 1972)
- Tinaminyssus milvi (Fain, 1962)
- Tinaminyssus minisetosum (Butenko, 1984)
- Tinaminyssus myristicivorae Domrow, 1967
- Tinaminyssus navajasi (Pereira & Castro, 1949)
- Tinaminyssus neoixobrychi Pence, 1972
- Tinaminyssus ocyphabus (Domrow, 1965)
- Tinaminyssus oenae (Fain, 1963)
- Tinaminyssus peleiae (Wilson, 1966)
- Tinaminyssus phabus (Domrow, 1965)
- Tinaminyssus phalliger (Fain, 1965)
- Tinaminyssus phassae (Wilson, 1966)
- Tinaminyssus prionituri (Wilson, 1966)
- Tinaminyssus pteroclesi (Fain, 1963)
- Tinaminyssus ptilinopi (Wilson, 1964)
- Tinaminyssus sartbaevi (Butenko, 1984)
- Tinaminyssus saucerottiae (Fain & Aitken, 1967)
- Tinaminyssus schoutedeni (Fain, 1956)
- Tinaminyssus senotrusovae (Butenko, 1984)
- Tinaminyssus serraoi (Castro, 1948)
- Tinaminyssus squamosus (Vitzthum, 1935)
- Tinaminyssus streptopeliae (Fain, 1962)
- Tinaminyssus streptopelioides (Butenko, 1984)
- Tinaminyssus tanysipterae (Wilson, 1966)
- Tinaminyssus tetae (Wilson, 1964)
- Tinaminyssus tinamicola (Fain, 1963)
- Tinaminyssus trappi (Pereira & Castro, 1949)
- Tinaminyssus treronis (Fain, 1956)
- Tinaminyssus triangulus (Strandtmann, 1961)
- Tinaminyssus trichoglossi (Domrow, 1964)
- Tinaminyssus turturi (Fain, 1962)
- Tinaminyssus welchi Domrow, 1967
- Tinaminyssus zenaidurae (Crossley, 1952)
- Tinaminyssus zumpti (Fain, 1960)
