= Sternostoma =

Scientific classification
- Kingdom: Animalia
- Phylum: Arthropoda
- Subphylum: Chelicerata
- Class: Arachnida
- Order: Mesostigmata
- Family: Rhinonyssidae
- Genus: Sternostoma; Berlese & Trouessart, 1889

Synonyms
- Sternoecius Fain & Aitken, 1967; Sternostomum Vitzthum, 1935; Rhinosterna Fain, 1964

Genus of mites

Sternostoma is a genus of mites in the family Rhinonyssidae. There are more than 70 described species in Sternostoma.

== Species ==
These 79 species belong to the genus Sternostoma:

- Sternostoma alexfaini Feider & Mironescu, 1969
- Sternostoma alexmironi Dimov, 2020
- Sternostoma antoni Dimov, 2020
- Sternostoma artami Feider & Mironescu, 1982
- Sternostoma augei Amaral, 1962
- Sternostoma aymarae (Fain, 1964)
- Sternostoma batis Fain, 1957
- Sternostoma boydae Strandtmann, 1951
- Sternostoma bruxellarum Fain, 1961
- Sternostoma chakarovae Dimov, 2020
- Sternostoma christinae Guevara-Benitez, Lopez-Roman & Ubeda-Ontiveros, 1974
- Sternostoma cisticolae Fain, 1957
- Sternostoma clementei Amaral, 1968
- Sternostoma colii Fain, 1956
- Sternostoma constricta Feider & Mironescu, 1982
- Sternostoma cooremani halcyoni Fain & Nadchatram, 1962
- Sternostoma cordiscutata Feider & Mironescu, 1982
- Sternostoma crotophagae Pence & Casto, 1975
- Sternostoma cryptorhynchum Berlese & Trouessart, 1889
- Sternostoma cuculorum korolevae Bregetova & Slavoshevskaya, 1983
- Sternostoma darlingi Spicer, 1984
- Sternostoma delianovae Dimov, 2020
- Sternostoma dumetellae Pence, 1972
- Sternostoma dureni Fain, 1956
- Sternostoma enevi Dimov, 2020
- Sternostoma epistomata Feider & Mironescu, 1973
- Sternostoma eurocephali Fain, 1960
- Sternostoma ficedulae Fain & Sixl, 1971
- Sternostoma francolini Fain, 1960
- Sternostoma fulicae Fain & Bafort, 1963
- Sternostoma furmani Strandtmann, 1960
- Sternostoma gallowayi Knee, 2018
- Sternostoma giganteum Fain, 1962
- Sternostoma gliciphilae Domrow, 1966
- Sternostoma graculi (Butenko, 1999)
- Sternostoma guevarai Guevara-Benitez, Ubeda-Ontiveros & Cutillas-Barrios, 1979
- Sternostoma hedonophilum Fain & Aitken, 1970
- Sternostoma hirundinis Fain, 1956
- Sternostoma hirundo Fain, Herin & Puylaert, 1977
- Sternostoma hutsoni Furman, 1957
- Sternostoma hylandi Fain & Johnston, 1966
- Sternostoma inflatum Fain, 1963
- Sternostoma isabelae Ubuda-Ontiveros & Guevara-Benitez, 1980
- Sternostoma kelloggi Hyland & Clark, 1959
- Sternostoma kodrensis Shumilo & Lunkashu, 1970
- Sternostoma lagonostictae Fain, 1956
- Sternostoma longisetosae Hyland, 1961
- Sternostoma loxiae Fain, 1965
- Sternostoma marchae Dimov, 2012
- Sternostoma mortelmansi Fain & Bastin, 1959
- Sternostoma nectarinia Fain, 1956
- Sternostoma neosittae Domrow, 1967
- Sternostoma numerovi (Butenko, 1999)
- Sternostoma opistaspis Feider & Mironescu, 1982
- Sternostoma paddae Fain, 1958
- Sternostoma pastor Fain, 1967
- Sternostoma pencei Spicer, 1984
- Sternostoma piprae (Fain & Aitken, 1967)
- Sternostoma pirangae Pence, 1973
- Sternostoma porteri Hyland, 1963
- Sternostoma quiscali Fain & Aitken, 1967
- Sternostoma sayornis Pence & Casto, 1975
- Sternostoma schiffornis Fain & Aitken, 1970
- Sternostoma setifer Knee, 2008
- Sternostoma sialiphilus Hyland & Ford, 1960
- Sternostoma sinense Fain & Bafort, 1963
- Sternostoma sternahirundo Butenko, 1974
- Sternostoma straeleni Fain, 1958
- Sternostoma strandtmanni Furman, 1957
- Sternostoma strigitis Butenko, 1976
- Sternostoma sturnicola Fain, 1956
- Sternostoma tangarae Fain & Aitken, 1967
- Sternostoma technaui (Vitzthum, 1935)
- Sternostoma thienponti Fain, 1956
- Sternostoma tracheacolum Lawrence, 1948
- Sternostoma tyrannus Brooks & Strandtmann, 1960
- Sternostoma ubedai Ubeda-Ontiveros & Guevara-Benitez, 1981
- Sternostoma ziegleri Feider & Mironescu, 1982
- Sternostoma zini Dimov & Knee, 2012
