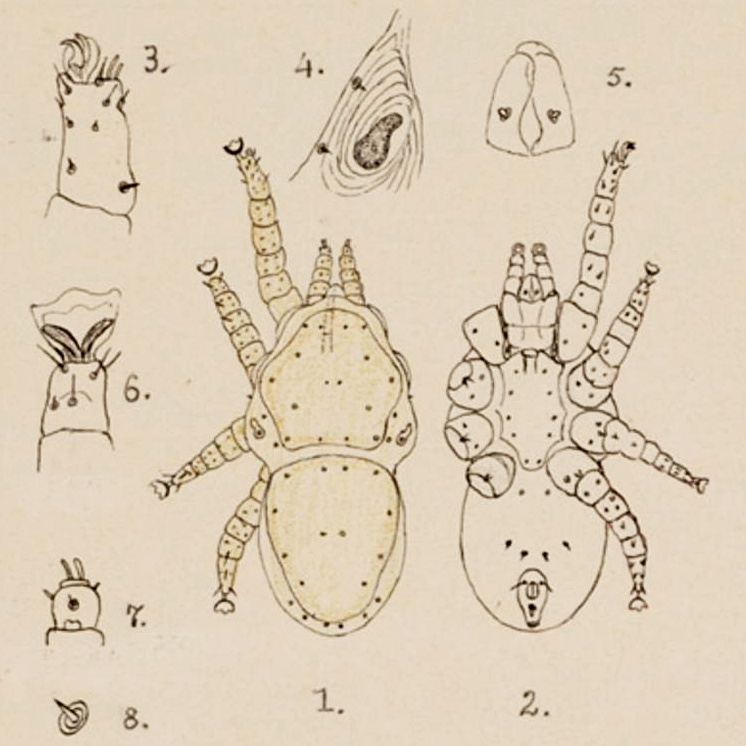

Scientific classification
- Kingdom: Animalia
- Phylum: Arthropoda
- Subphylum: Chelicerata
- Class: Arachnida
- Order: Mesostigmata
- Family: Rhinonyssidae
- Genus: Ptilonyssus; Berlese & Trouessart, 1889

Diversity
- at least 230 species

Synonyms
- Hapalognatha

= Ptilonyssus =

Genus of mites

Ptilonyssus is a genus of mites in the family Rhinonyssidae. There are at least 230 described species in Ptilonyssus.

== Species ==
These 230 species belong to Ptilonyssus, a genus of mites in the family Rhinonyssidae.

== Ptilonyssus species ==
- Ptilonyssus acanthopneustes Stanyukovich & Butenko, 2003
- Ptilonyssus acrocephali Fain, 1964
- Ptilonyssus afroturdi Fain, 1962
- Ptilonyssus agelaii Fain & Aitken, 1967
- Ptilonyssus ailuroedi Domrow, 1964
- Ptilonyssus alaudae (Butenko & Stanyukovich, 2001)
- Ptilonyssus amarali Fain, 1964
- Ptilonyssus amazonicus Fain, 1972
- Ptilonyssus ammomani Stanyukovich & Butenko, 2003
- Ptilonyssus andropadi Fain, 1956
- Ptilonyssus angrensis (Castro, 1948)
- Ptilonyssus angustirostris Fain & Aitken, 1968
- Ptilonyssus anthi Stanyukovich & Butenko, 2003
- Ptilonyssus astridae Fain, 1956
- Ptilonyssus aureliani Fain, 1956
- Ptilonyssus balimoensis Sakakibara, 1968
- Ptilonyssus belemensis Fain & Aitken, 1968
- Ptilonyssus bombycillae Fain, 1972
- Ptilonyssus bradypteri (Fain, 1962)
- Ptilonyssus buloloensis Sakakibara, 1968
- Ptilonyssus cacici Fain, 1964
- Ptilonyssus calamocichlae Fain, 1963
- Ptilonyssus calandrellae (Bregetova, 1967)
- Ptilonyssus callinectoides (Brooks & Strandtmann, 1960)
- Ptilonyssus calvaria Knee, 2008
- Ptilonyssus camptostoma Hyland & Moorhouse, 1970
- Ptilonyssus capensis Zumpt & Till, 1955
- Ptilonyssus capitatus (Strandtmann, 1956)
- Ptilonyssus carduelis Fain, 1962
- Ptilonyssus cerchneis Fain, 1957
- Ptilonyssus cercomacrae Fain & Aitken, 1970
- Ptilonyssus certhiae Fain & Bafort, 1963
- Ptilonyssus certhiaxicola Fain, 1964
- Ptilonyssus certhilaudae Fain, 1972
- Ptilonyssus chalybaedomesticae Amaral, 1967
- Ptilonyssus chiroxiphiae Fain & Aitken, 1970
- Ptilonyssus chloris Fain, 1962
- Ptilonyssus chlorocichlae Fain, 1956
- Ptilonyssus chloropsicola Fain, 1966
- Ptilonyssus cinnyricincli Fain, 1962
- Ptilonyssus cinnyris Zumpt & Till, 1955
- Ptilonyssus cisticolarum Fain, 1959
- Ptilonyssus coccothraustis Fain & Bafort, 1963
- Ptilonyssus colluricinclae Domrow, 1964
- Ptilonyssus colopteryx Fain & Aitken, 1971
- Ptilonyssus condylocoxa Fain & Lukoschus, 1979
- Ptilonyssus conopophagae Fain & Aitken, 1970
- Ptilonyssus conopophilae Fain & Lukoschus, 1979
- Ptilonyssus corcoracis Domrow, 1969
- Ptilonyssus corvi Pence, 1972
- Ptilonyssus corythopicola Fain & Aitken, 1970
- Ptilonyssus cractici Domrow, 1964
- Ptilonyssus cyanosylviae Butenko & Lavrovskaya, 1980
- Ptilonyssus daptrii Fain, 1966
- Ptilonyssus degtiarevae Dimov & Mironov, 2012
- Ptilonyssus dendrocittae (Sakakibara & Strandtmann, 1968)
- Ptilonyssus dendrocolapticola Fain & Aitken, 1968
- Ptilonyssus desfontainei Zumpt & Till, 1955
- Ptilonyssus diadori Butenko & Lavrovskaya, 1980
- Ptilonyssus dicaei Domrow, 1966
- Ptilonyssus dicruri Fain, 1956
- Ptilonyssus dimi Dimov, 2020
- Ptilonyssus dioptrornis Fain, 1956
- Ptilonyssus dolicaspis Feider & Mironescu, 1980
- Ptilonyssus domrowi Feider & Mironescu, 1980
- Ptilonyssus donatoi Pereira & Castro, 1949
- Ptilonyssus dryoscopi Zumpt & Till, 1955
- Ptilonyssus echinatus Berlese & Trouessart, 1889
- Ptilonyssus elaeniae Fain & Aitken, 1967
- Ptilonyssus elbeli (Strandtmann, 1960)
- Ptilonyssus elongatus Fain, 1964
- Ptilonyssus emberizae Fain, 1956
- Ptilonyssus enicuri Fain & Nadchatram, 1962
- Ptilonyssus enriettii Castro, 1948
- Ptilonyssus eremophilae Butenko & Lavrovskaya, 1980
- Ptilonyssus estrildicola Fain, 1959
- Ptilonyssus euroturdi Fain & Hyland, 1963
- Ptilonyssus faini (Strandtmann, 1960)
- Ptilonyssus fluvicolae (Fain & Aitken, 1967)
- Ptilonyssus formicarii Fain & Aitken, 1970
- Ptilonyssus fringillae Fain & Sixl, 1971
- Ptilonyssus fringillicola Fain, 1959
- Ptilonyssus gerygonae Domrow, 1967
- Ptilonyssus gilcolladoi Ubeda, Rodriguez, Guevara & Rojas, 1989
- Ptilonyssus gliciphilae Domrow, 1966
- Ptilonyssus grallinae Domrow, 1964
- Ptilonyssus gressitti (Baker & Delfinado, 1964)
- Ptilonyssus harko Dimov, 2020
- Ptilonyssus hirsti (de Castro & Pereira, 1947)
- Ptilonyssus hiyodori Kadosaka, Kaneko & Asanuma, 1987
- Ptilonyssus hoffmannae Luz-Zamudio, 1984
- Ptilonyssus hoseini (Fain & Aitken, 1967)
- Ptilonyssus hylophylax Fain & Aitken, 1970
- Ptilonyssus hypocnemoides Fain & Aitken, 1970
- Ptilonyssus icteridius Strandtmann & Furman, 1956
- Ptilonyssus indicatoris Fain, 1957
- Ptilonyssus inflatipalpus Fain & Aitken, 1970
- Ptilonyssus inornatus Fain & Aitken, 1968
- Ptilonyssus insularis Cerny, 1969
- Ptilonyssus intermedius (Hirst, 1922)
- Ptilonyssus isakovae Butenko & Lavrovskaya, 1983
- Ptilonyssus japuibensis Fain & Aitken, 1970
- Ptilonyssus langei Butenko, 1972
- Ptilonyssus lanii Zumpt & Till, 1955
- Ptilonyssus lobatus Strandtmann, 1960
- Ptilonyssus lovottiae Dimov & Mironov, 2012
- Ptilonyssus ludovicianus Cerny, 1969
- Ptilonyssus lusciniae (Fain, 1962)
- Ptilonyssus lymozemae Domrow, 1965
- Ptilonyssus macclurei Fain, 1963
- Ptilonyssus madagascariensis Gretillat, Capron & Brygoo, 1959
- Ptilonyssus malacoptilae (Fain & Aitken, 1971)
- Ptilonyssus malaysiae Fain, 1964
- Ptilonyssus maluri Domrow, 1965
- Ptilonyssus mariacastroae Fain, 1961
- Ptilonyssus melanocoryphae (Bregetova, 1967)
- Ptilonyssus meliphagae Domrow, 1964
- Ptilonyssus melissae Spicer, 1977
- Ptilonyssus melittophagi Fain, 1956
- Ptilonyssus microecae Domrow, 1966
- Ptilonyssus mimi George, 1961
- Ptilonyssus mironovi Dimov, 2012
- Ptilonyssus missimensis Sakakibara, 1968
- Ptilonyssus monarchae Domrow, 1969
- Ptilonyssus montifringillae Butenko & Lavrovskaya, 1983
- Ptilonyssus morofskyi Hyland, 1963
- Ptilonyssus motacillae Fain, 1966
- Ptilonyssus muscicapae Bregetova, 1970
- Ptilonyssus muscicapoides Butenko & Lavrovskaya, 1980
- Ptilonyssus myiobii Fain & Aitken, 1970
- Ptilonyssus myrmotherulae Fain & Aitken, 1968
- Ptilonyssus myzanthae Domrow, 1964
- Ptilonyssus myzomelae Domrow, 1965
- Ptilonyssus nadchatrami Fain, 1964
- Ptilonyssus neochmiae Domrow, 1969
- Ptilonyssus nicatoris Fain, 1958
- Ptilonyssus nivalis Knee, 2008
- Ptilonyssus novaeguineae (Hirst, 1921)
- Ptilonyssus nucifragae (Hirst, 1923)
- Ptilonyssus nudus Berlese & Trouessart, 1889
- Ptilonyssus ohioensis Fain & Johnston, 1966
- Ptilonyssus olaoi Pereira & Castro, 1949
- Ptilonyssus orientalis (Ewing, 1933)
- Ptilonyssus orioli Fain, 1956
- Ptilonyssus orthonychus Domrow, 1969
- Ptilonyssus paradisaeus (Sakakibara, 1968)
- Ptilonyssus paranensis (Castro, 1948)
- Ptilonyssus pari Fain & Hyland, 1963
- Ptilonyssus pastoris Butenko, 1972
- Ptilonyssus pericrocoti (Sakakibara, 1967)
- Ptilonyssus perisorei George, 1961
- Ptilonyssus phainopeplae George, 1961
- Ptilonyssus philemoni Domrow, 1964
- Ptilonyssus phyllastrephi Zumpt & Till, 1955
- Ptilonyssus phylloscopi Fain, 1962
- Ptilonyssus pinicola Knee, 2008
- Ptilonyssus pipromorphae Fain & Aitken, 1967
- Ptilonyssus pirangae (Cerny, 1969)
- Ptilonyssus pittae Domrow, 1964
- Ptilonyssus platypsaris Fain & Aitken, 1971
- Ptilonyssus platyrhinchus Fain & Aitken, 1970
- Ptilonyssus plesiotypicus Knee, 2008
- Ptilonyssus ploceanus Fain, 1956
- Ptilonyssus poriazovi Dimov, 2020
- Ptilonyssus prunellae Fain & Bafort, 1963
- Ptilonyssus psalidoprocnei Fain, 1956
- Ptilonyssus psaltriparus Spicer, 1978
- Ptilonyssus pseudothymanzae Fain & Lukoschus, 1979
- Ptilonyssus psophodae Domrow, 1964
- Ptilonyssus ptyonoprognes Butenko & Lavrovskaya, 1983
- Ptilonyssus pycnonoti Fain, 1963
- Ptilonyssus pygiptilae Fain & Aiken, 1971
- Ptilonyssus pygmaeus (Bregetova, 1967)
- Ptilonyssus pyriglenae Fain & Aitken, 1968
- Ptilonyssus pyrrhulinus Stanyukovich & Butenko, 2003
- Ptilonyssus rabelloi (Castro, 1948)
- Ptilonyssus radovskyi Feider & Mironescu, 1980
- Ptilonyssus reguli Fain & Sixl, 1969
- Ptilonyssus rhipidurae Domrow, 1966
- Ptilonyssus richmondenae George, 1961
- Ptilonyssus ripariae Stanyukovich & Butenko, 2003
- Ptilonyssus ruandae Fain, 1963
- Ptilonyssus sairae Castro, 1948
- Ptilonyssus salpinctis George, 1961
- Ptilonyssus saltator Fain & Aitken, 1971
- Ptilonyssus schoenobaeni Fain, Sixl & Moritsch, 1974
- Ptilonyssus schumili Butenko & Lavrovskaya, 1980
- Ptilonyssus sclateriae Fain & Aitken, 1970
- Ptilonyssus sclerurus Fain & Aitken, 1970
- Ptilonyssus serini Fain, 1956
- Ptilonyssus setosae Domrow, 1969
- Ptilonyssus sialiae George, 1961
- Ptilonyssus sittae Fain, 1965
- Ptilonyssus souzai Pereira & Castro, 1949
- Ptilonyssus sphecotheris Domrow, 1964
- Ptilonyssus spini Stanyukovich & Butenko, 2003
- Ptilonyssus spinosus (Brooks & Strandtmann, 1960)
- Ptilonyssus steganurae Fain, 1967
- Ptilonyssus sternostomicus Fain & Aitken, 1968
- Ptilonyssus stomioperae Domrow, 1966
- Ptilonyssus strandtmanni Fain, 1956
- Ptilonyssus stresemanni Vitzthum, 1935
- Ptilonyssus struthideae Domrow, 1969
- Ptilonyssus sturnopastoris Fain, 1963
- Ptilonyssus sylviicola Stanyukovich & Butenko, 2003
- Ptilonyssus tachycinetae George, 1961
- Ptilonyssus terenotricci Fain & Aitken, 1970
- Ptilonyssus teretristis Cerny, 1969
- Ptilonyssus terpsiphonei Fain, 1956
- Ptilonyssus thamnomanes Fain & Aitken, 1970
- Ptilonyssus thamnophili Fain & Aitken, 1967
- Ptilonyssus thryothori Pence, 1972
- Ptilonyssus thymanzae Domrow, 1964
- Ptilonyssus tillae Fain, 1959
- Ptilonyssus toxostomae Pence, 1972
- Ptilonyssus traubi Strandtmann, 1960
- Ptilonyssus travassosfilhoi (Castro, 1948)
- Ptilonyssus triscutatus (Vitzthum, 1935)
- Ptilonyssus troglodytis Fain, 1964
- Ptilonyssus trouessarti pseudotrouessarti Sakakibara, 1968
- Ptilonyssus viduicola Fain, 1962
- Ptilonyssus vireonis (Dusbabek, 1969)
- Ptilonyssus vossi Spicer, 1977
- Ptilonyssus walterberghi Fain, 1958
- Ptilonyssus werneri (Castro, 1948)
- Ptilonyssus wilsoni Sakakibara, 1967
- Ptilonyssus xenops Fain & Aitken, 1968
- Ptilonyssus xyphorhynchus Fain & Aitken, 1970
- Ptilonyssus zeferinoi Amaral, 1968
- Ptilonyssus zumpti Fain, 1956
