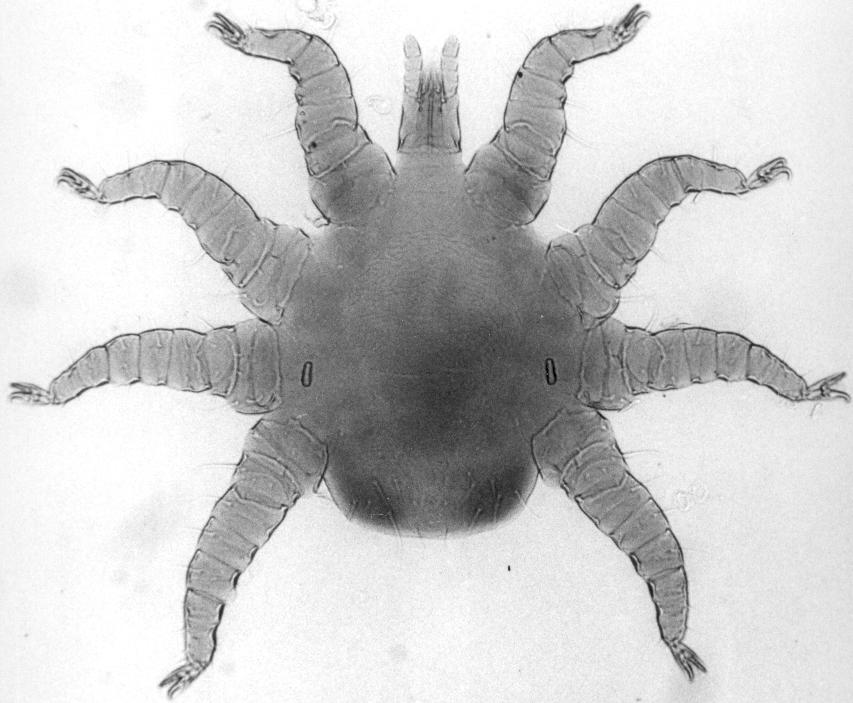
- Tinaminyssus melloi, nymph, Hungary

Scientific classification
- Kingdom: Animalia
- Phylum: Arthropoda
- Subphylum: Chelicerata
- Class: Arachnida
- Order: Mesostigmata
- Suborder: Monogynaspida
- Infraorder: Gamasina
- Superfamily: Dermanyssoidea
- Family: Rhinonyssidae; Trouessart, 1895

Subfamilies
- Ptilonyssinae Fain, 1957; Rhinoeciinae Fain, 1957; Rhinonyssinae Trouessart, 1895

= Rhinonyssidae =

Family of mites

Rhinonyssidae is a family of mites in the order Mesostigmata. There are about 16 genera and at least 460 described species in Rhinonyssidae.

The mites of this family are obligate parasites of avian respiratory systems, living in nasal passageways. They are endoparasites, typically living their entire life in within the respiratory systems of birds.

Rhinonyssid mites are widespread, and have been observed on every continent including Antarctica (Rhinonyssus sphenisci, first observed in 1963).

== Genera ==
These 16 genera belong to the family Rhinonyssidae:

- Charadrinyssus Butenko, 1984
- Larinyssus Strandtmann, 1948
- Locustellonyssus Bregetova, 1965
- Passeronyssus Fain, 1960
- Pipronyssus Fain & Aitken, 1967
- Ptilonyssus Berlese & Trouessart, 1889
- Rallinyssus Strandtmann, 1948
- Rhinoecius Cooreman, 1946
- Rhinonyssus Trouessart, 1894
- Ruandanyssus Fain, 1957
- Sternostoma Berlese & Trouessart, 1889
- Tinaminyssus Strandtmann & Wharton, 1958
- Trochilonyssus Fain & Aitken, 1967
- Tyranninyssus Brooks & Strandtmann, 1960
- Vitznyssus Castro, 1948
- Zumptnyssus Fain, 1959

Agapornyssus was considered a genus of Rhinonyssidae, but has since been determined to be a taxonomic synonym of the genus Sternostoma.
