= Repellent =

Repellent can refer to:

- Insect repellent
- Animal repellent
- Water repellent
