= Radio-activated guard box =

Pest control device

Radio activated guard (RAG) boxes are experimental pest control devices intended to deter wolves from preying on livestock. Specifically, they are designed to work against wolves which have been fitted with radio tracking collars prior to being re-released into the wild (and, by extension, the packs of which they are members). The device was conceived by Edward Cummings, a rancher from Montana, who suggested that a hazing device could be tuned to a radio collar's frequency; after discussions with ranchers, the specifications of the device were designed and prototyped by Dr. John Shivik, then with the United States Department of Agriculture Wildlife Services, National Wildlife Research Center. Very few of the devices have been produced for commercial sale.

The RAG box is a "disruptive stimulus device." It uses a strobe light and two loudspeakers which emit an annoying noise; these are activated when the box detects the signal from a radio collar at short range, and scare off the wolf pack.

The boxes were subjected to limited testing on wolves in Idaho and researchers concluded that they are effective for protecting livestock in small pastures; the technology is thought to be limited, however, because of the complexity of the device and its price.

== See also ==
- Electronic pest control
