= Repeller =

Repeller may refer to:

- The opposite of an attractor, in dynamical systems' theory (more frequently than "repellor")
- An electrode at a voltage to repel charge carriers (in vacuum or in a plasma)
- Animal repeller
- A device or plant that repels vermin, in horticulture or gardening
- Reppeller, in religion, fantasy, science fiction, etc., a god, a magic item, or technical device with the power to protect against offenders
- Turbine rotor in a free flow, e.g. a wind turbine (the term is rarely used in English)
- A fictional villain in the Batman Beyond animated television series season 3 episode "Untouchable"

== See also ==
- Rapeller
