= Bird control =

Methods to eliminate or deter pest birds from landing, roosting and nesting

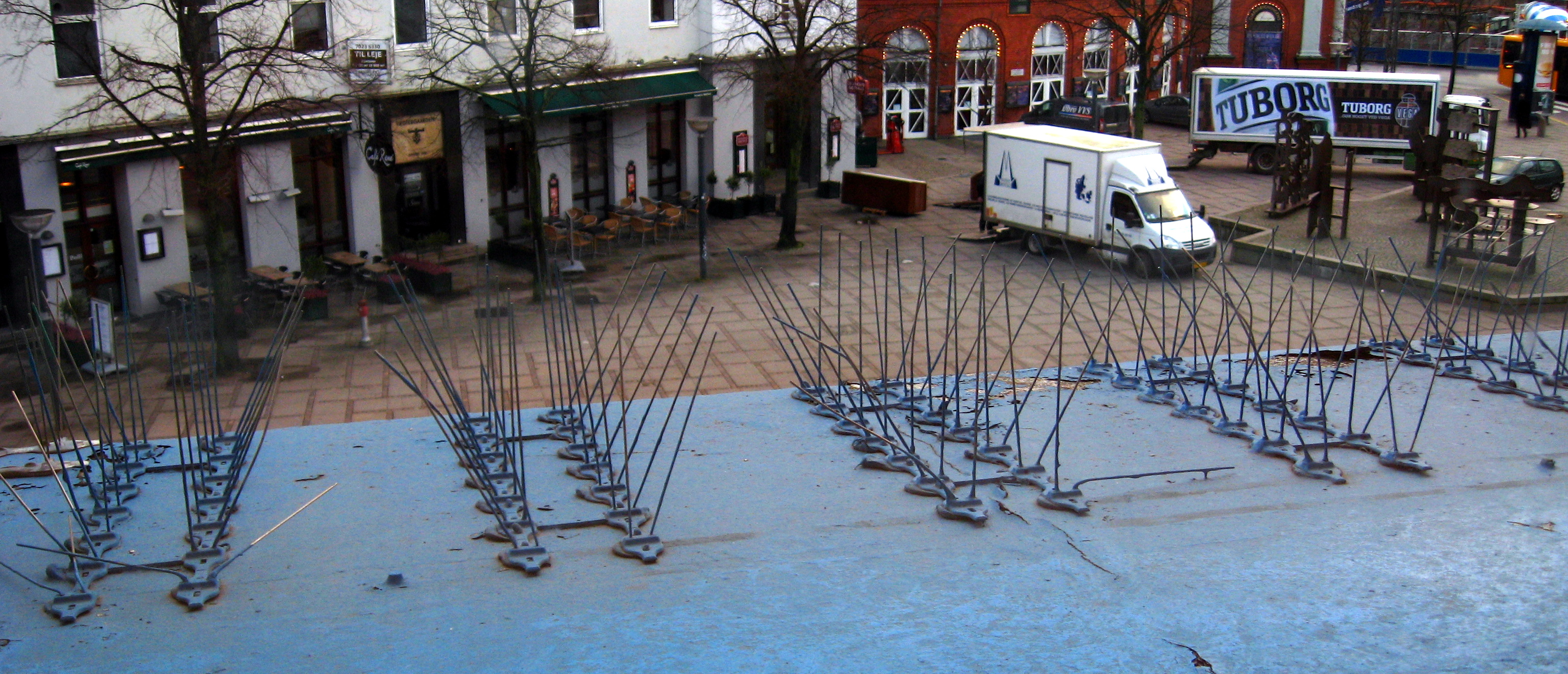
Bird control spikes on a rooftop in Denmark

Bird control or bird abatement involves the methods to eliminate or deter birds from landing, roosting and nesting.

Methods of bird control (often called deterrence, dispersal, or hazing) include physical exclusion, visual, auditory, and multi-sensory deterrents, trained dogs or birds of prey (falconry), chemicals, and lethal control. Bird control is frequently used for birds like feral pigeons, blackbirds, geese, and gulls, depending on the area.

The most commonly-observed form of bird control may be the bird spikes employed to deter roosting in cities. However, bird control may be desired in several different contexts unrelated to cosmetic concerns in urban areas. Birds are regularly removed or dispersed from airfields to mitigate bird strikes. Avian deterrence is also frequently employed due to crop loss on agricultural fields. In a similar vein, piscivorous birds are frequently controlled on or near aquaculture facilities to mitigate losses. In other contexts, bird control may be used to promote safety for birds, such as deterring them from entering windfarms or from roosting in electrical equipment.

== Contexts for Bird Control ==
=== Urban Environments ===
Bird control is frequently desired in urban areas for sanitary or aesthetic reasons; common birds such as feral pigeons are often cited as a health risk, and their droppings can cover statues, buildings, and sidewalks in areas where they roost in large numbers.

For some species, deterrence may be accomplished by reducing incentives; the Humane Society of the United States recommends for feral pigeons to reduce feeding gradually over several weeks, after which the flock will disperse, and to clean food attractants regularly to avoid unintentional feeding. The Humane Society continues, "there is little evidence linking pigeons directly to human infections". Pigeon-related diseases are rare, and people most at risk are those with a compromised immune system.

=== Agriculture ===
Birds can cause loss of revenue via the consumption of crops and other agricultural products. For specialty crops such as sunflowers and grapes, blackbird flocks in particular can be extremely difficult to manage. In aquaculture facilities, piscivorous birds such as cormorants and herons can inflict losses by eating farmed fish and invertebrates. The presence of wild birds at poultry farms introduces serious biosecurity risks: disease, including avian influenza, may be passed from free-ranging birds to captive flocks.

=== Airports ===
The presence of birds at airports can increase the risk of bird strikes, or collisions between birds and aircraft – the crash of US Airways Flight 1549, also known as the "Miracle on the Hudson," was caused by a bird strike with Canada geese. Bird control on airports often focuses on large-bodied birds, which are most hazardous to aircraft, such as geese, ducks, gulls, and vultures.

=== Electrical Infrastructure ===
Birds can damage power lines, transformers, and electrical substations, and these structures can also be detrimental to birds – typically, damage occurs when birds are electrocuted. One species which is a unique hazard to electrical infrastructure is the monk parakeet, a species which is invasive across the northern hemisphere and builds large, communal nests in electrical structures.

=== Renewable Energy Facilities ===
Bird control may be desired in large-scale energy production units to promote avian safety. Research is underway to deter waterbirds from solar farms, where they often crash land. Bird deterrents are also employed at wind farms, where collisions with turbine blades can be lethal to birds.

=== Golf Courses ===
Canada geese, gulls, and woodpeckers are the species most often targeted for deterrence on golf courses, due to the damage they inflict and also, in the case of geese and gulls, highly aggressive behaviours when nesting.

=== Landfills ===
Bird control is employed at landfills, and typically targets species like gulls, corvids, and raptors, which can spread waste outside the facility and interrupt operations.

== Methods ==
Bird control devices fall under two categories: deterrents and exclusions. Deterrents, such as acoustic devices, pyrotechnics, lasers, and bird spikes, discourage birds from landing or roosting in an area by presenting a physical obstacle or causing discomfort and annoyance for the target bird, or otherwise induce neophobia (fear of a novel stimulus). There are fewer exclusion devices, which include bird netting, mesh, and structural modifications, but may also include more intense management options like habitat modification.

=== Exclusions ===
Physical bird deterrents (exclusions) aim to keep birds away from an area passively. They include steel or plastic spike systems, bird netting, electrified and simple wire systems, and slope barriers.

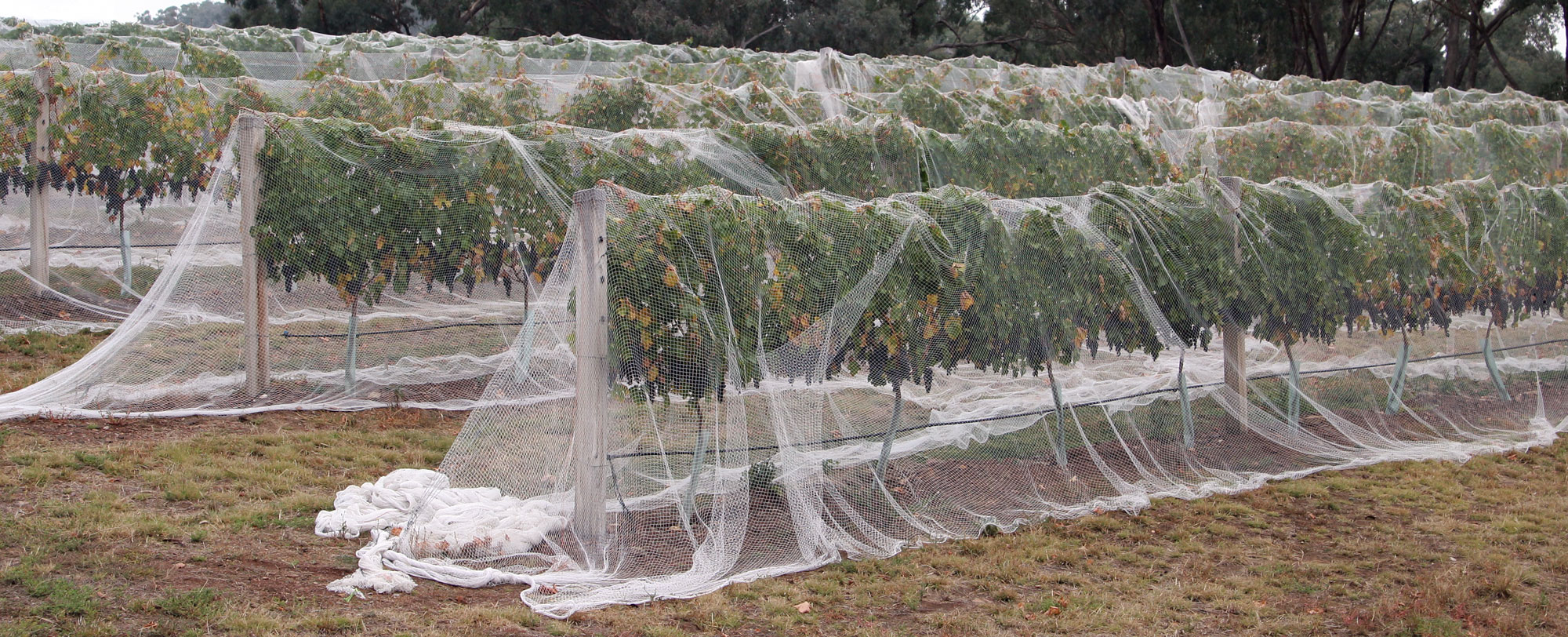
- Bird netting over grape vines
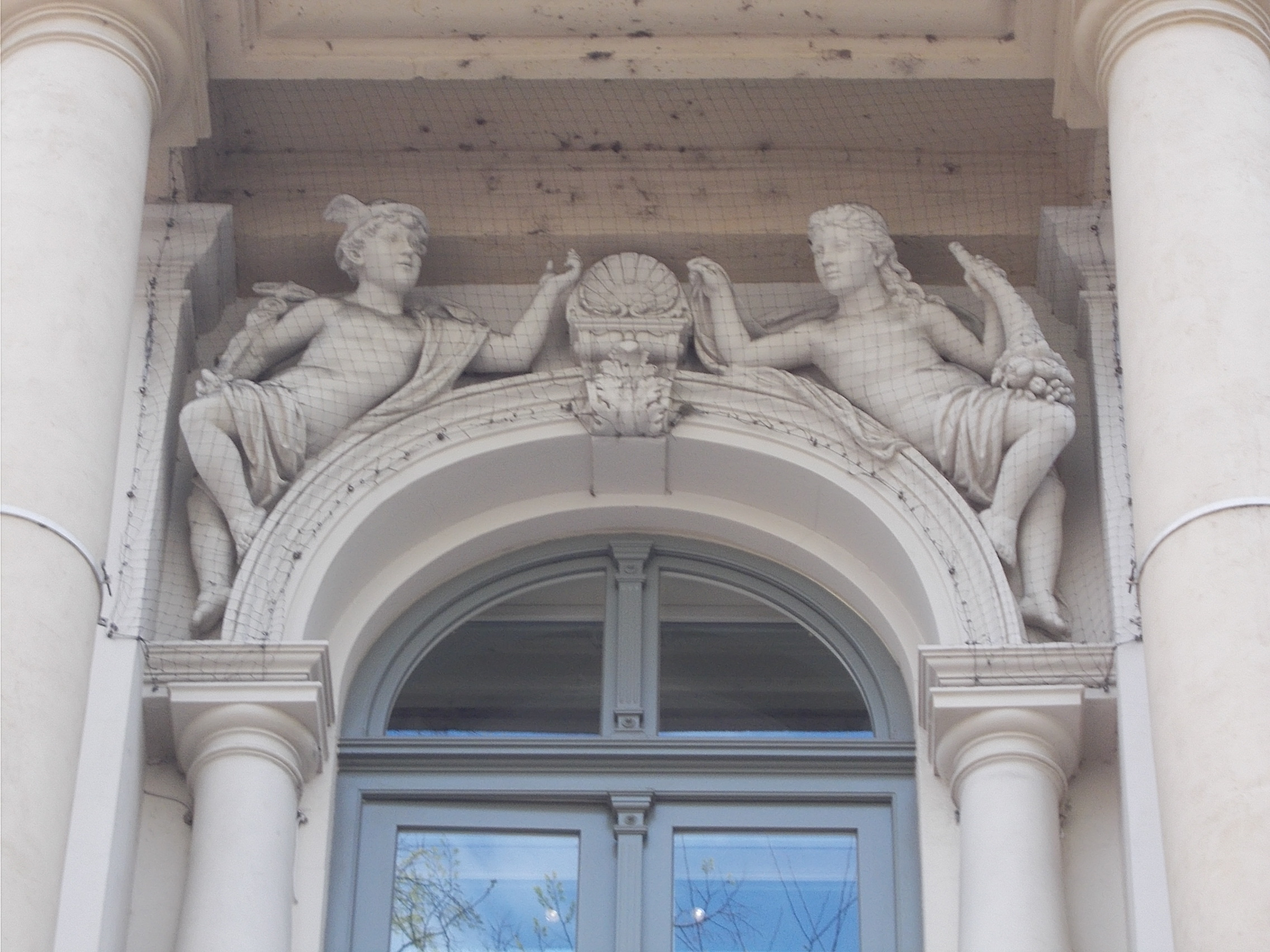
  Bird net to protect building elements, Budapest, 2021
  Bird netting is most commonly used in agricultural contexts, especially for high-value fruits such as wine grapes. The nets are placed over the plants, providing enough space so that birds perched on the netting cannot reach the fruit within. However, bird netting can inadvertently catch birds, including non-pest species; this has led to calls for bans on bird netting as a bird control method.
- Spikes can be counterproductive, as smaller species like sparrows can use the spikes as a structure to build their nests inside, while larger birds can remove the spikes. Birds usually adapt quickly to anti-bird spikes, even using them as nesting material. A magpie nest found in Antwerp, Belgium, consisted of 1500 metal spikes, around 50 meters of anti-bird spike strips, which the birds forcefully removed from the surrounding roofs. Nests like these are also reported from the United Kingdom and the Netherlands, and birds in the United States and Australia have also been observed removing anti-bird spikes.

Chemical deterrents range from products for turf to avicides. There are taste aversion products for geese (e.g. anthraquinone), and fogging agents containing methyl anthranilate used for smaller birds. Many localities have restrictions on the use of chemicals and pesticides targeted at birds if they intend to kill them. Non-avicide chemical deterrents that do not harm birds are widely used, but with limited results.

Habitat modification involves intensive methods to make an area less attractive to hazard bird species. This may involve methods such as crushing wetland cover vegetation to deter species like blackbirds, or minimizing the shoreline perimeter of wetlands and covering water surfaces.

=== Deterrents - Bird Scarers ===
Visual deterrents may fall into several subcategories, but have the general effect of scaring birds with novel, highly salient visual stimuli. They are often coupled with an additional deterrent, such as limited lethal control.

- Lights: Presentation of light stimuli have been employed as avian deterrents in several contexts. Pulsing red lights may be an effective deterrent and exclusionary device for waterbirds and corvids. Canada geese appear to be particularly repulsed by blue light. Use of ultraviolet lighting has also been explored; however, some birds are not particularly sensitive to ultraviolet light, making this approach more appropriate for smaller passerines.
- Lasers: The use of red or green lasers to deter or frighten birds has shown some promise, leading to decreased agricultural losses and immediate departure from a treated area. In some contexts, though, birds which were not initially scared away by laser systems remained in treated areas, indicating that lasers are not completely effective on their own. Lasers may damage avian retinas and cause long-term changes to behaviour and foraging that likely adversely affect birds.
- Wind-based: Wind-driven scare devices include tapes, balloons, kites, and lightweight spinning turbines propelled by wind. These devices reflect sunlight and in limited uses scare birds that are new to an area. While these devices may initially scare birds away, there has been no demonstration of long-term dispersal using sunlight reflection devices or similar approaches.

Acoustic deterrents may be combined with a visual deterrent, or be used alone. They produce loud or otherwise unpleasant noises, designed to scare birds or interrupt their communications.

- Propane cannons: Propane scare cannons are one of the most common types of bird scarer available in Europe and America. They are propane-powered gas guns which produce a periodic explosion. The audible bang can reach very loud volumes, in excess of 150 decibels, causing a flight reaction in birds. The similarity between a scare cannon and a 12-gauge shotgun is thought to invoke a fear response, although it is also effective against birds that have not been exposed to hunting pressure. Propane cannons are also used for scaring away deer. Birds can become habituated to the sound of regular cannon detonations, especially if it does not vary in its magnitude, pitch, or time interval. However, regularly moving the cannon, utilizing on-demand firing options like radio control, and combining cannons with other methods of deterrents can prevent habituation. Propane cannons can be disruptive to people living nearby due to their volume. One study found that restricting cannon use to hours when birds are active and incorporating better bird damage plans reduced the number of complaints from neighbours.

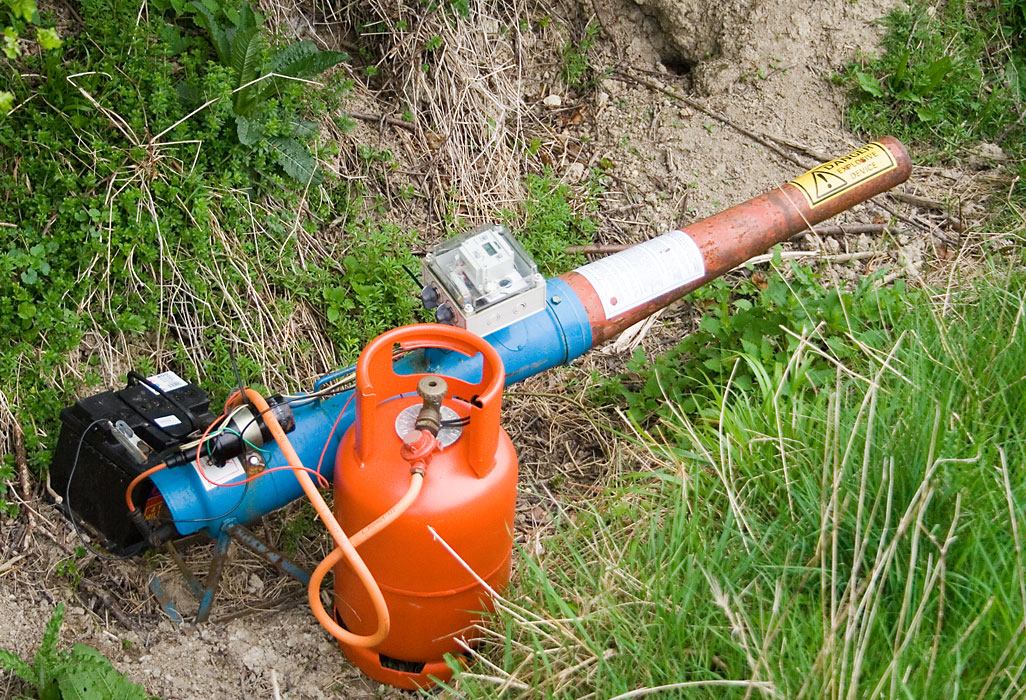
A typical propane gas gun bird scarer

Propane Cannon in action in a corn field. Note that the cannon rotates with each blast, thereby directing the sound to different portions of the surrounding area.

- Pyrotechnics: Pyrotechnic devices may also have a visual component (e.g., flashing), but are primarily intended to scare birds via loud noises. They are generally fired via specialized projectile devices (e.g., pistols) and can emit sounds similar to a shotgun or produce a loud "scream." In a study on double-crested cormorants, pyrotechnics were demonstrated to be equally effective to lethal control in keeping birds out of a treatment area.
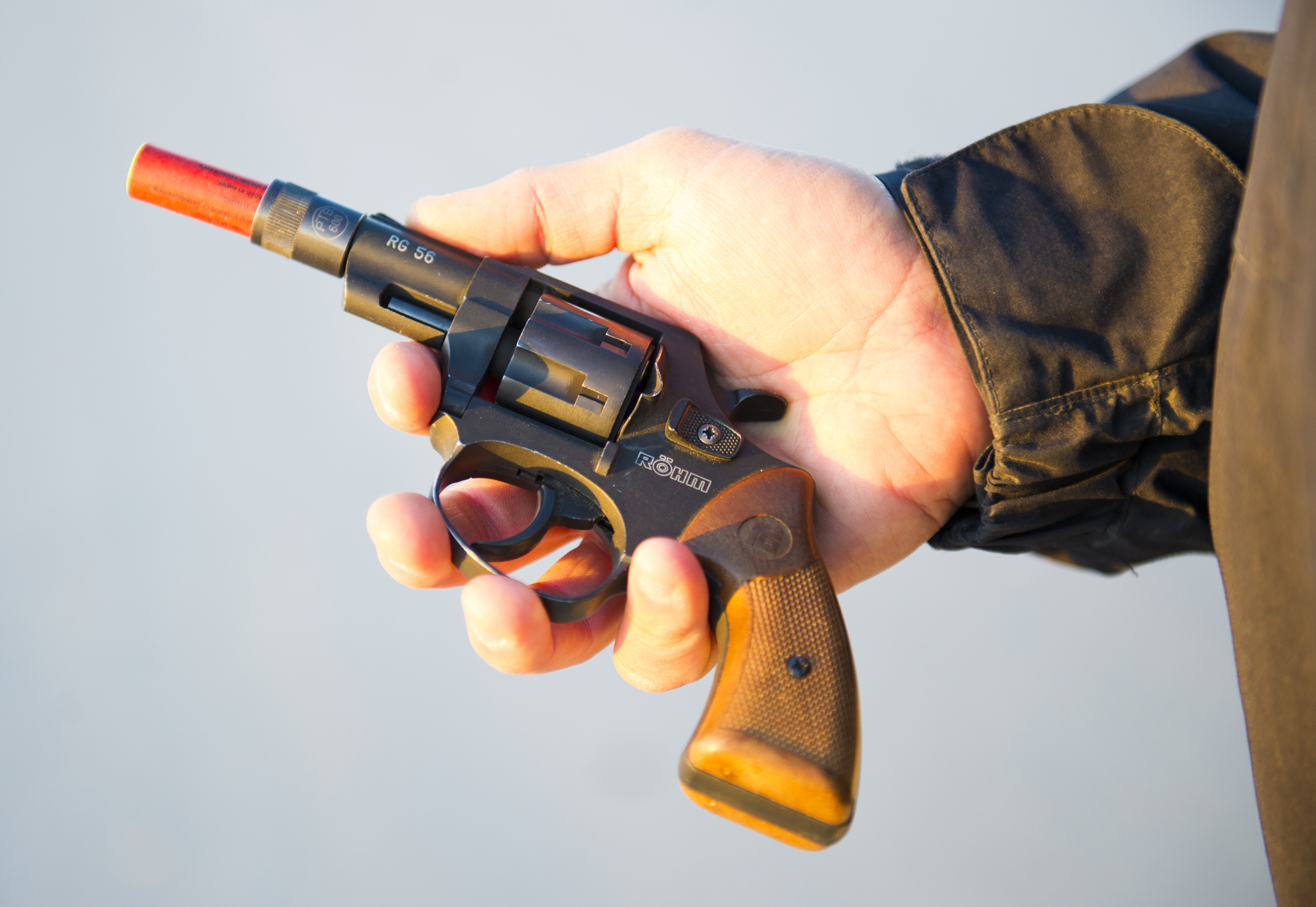
  Pyrotechnic pistol used to scare and disperse birds.
- Sonic deterrents: Sonic avian deterrents are used widely in large, open areas. Sounds include predator cries and distress calls of a variety of birds to discourage pest birds from coming into an area. Common locations for these devices include vineyards, reclamation plants, airports, and other open areas. There are also ultrasonic avian deterrents, which are inaudible to human ears. The use of a "sonic net" – deploying sound within the frequencies of target species calls and communication – has shown promise in deterring European starlings from airfields. In most cases, birds are expected to eventually habituate to sonic repellents, unless they are supplemented with other deterrent techniques.
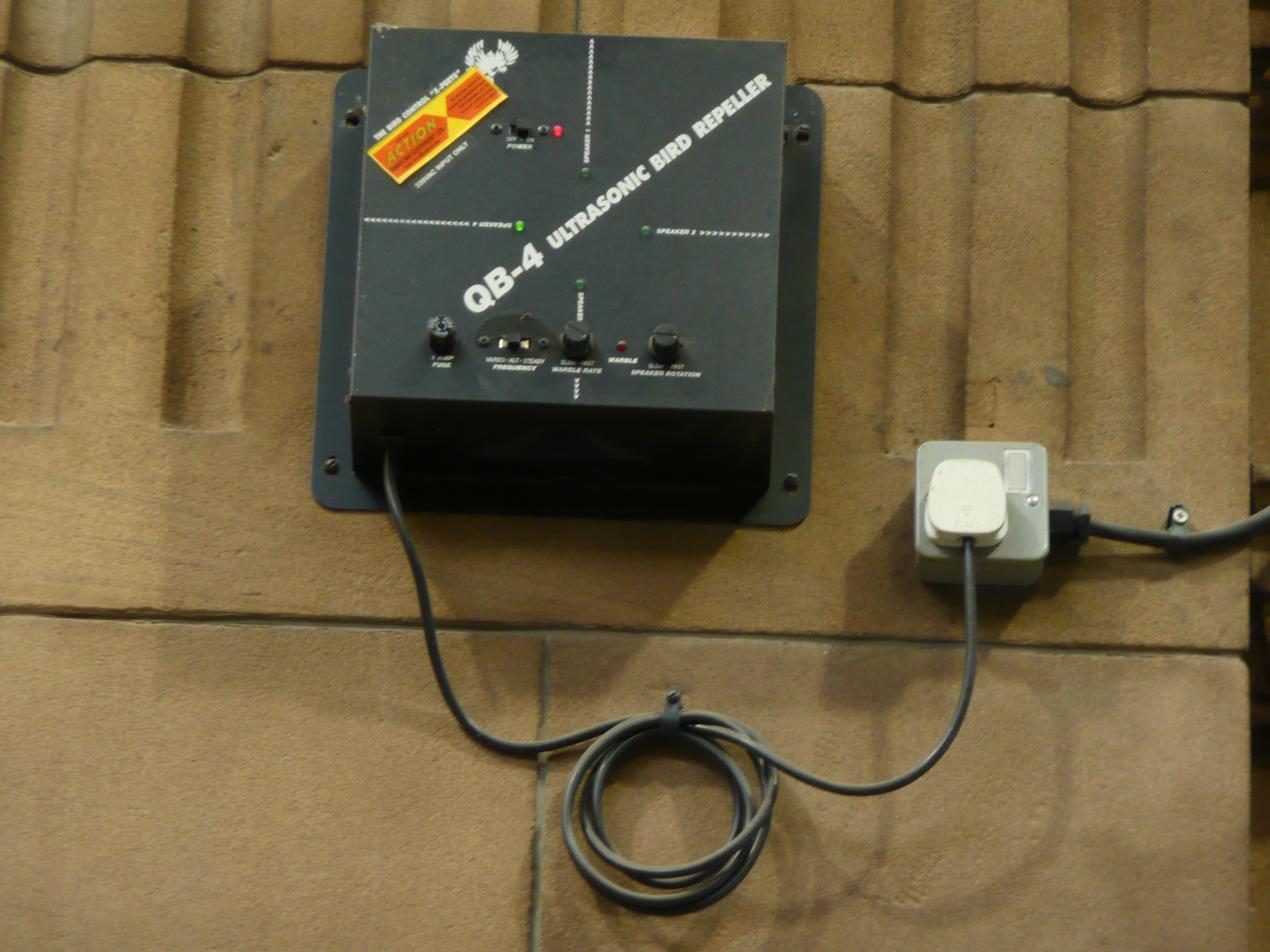
  Ultrasonic bird repeller, 2008

=== Deterrents - Remote-controlled vehicles ===
- RC Aircraft: Radio-controlled model aircraft have been used to scare or 'haze' bird pests since the early 1980s, mainly over airfields. This method has been shown to be effective, as birds habituate more slowly to a treatment in which they are being actively hazed. At Whiteman Air Force Base, Missouri, balsa wood radio-controlled aircraft are one of the primary bird harassment methods used to keep the airfield clear of raptors and other large birds, and have also proved effective at dispersing the base's roosting red-winged blackbirds.
- Uncrewed aerial systems (Drones): Drones are quickly becoming the preferred method of remotely-operated vehicle to haze birds. They have shown some promise in dispersing birds from landfills, and also appear to disperse flocks of blackbirds from crop fields, albeit not completely.

=== Deterrents - Predators ===
- Raptors: The use of predatory raptors to disperse prey species is a commonly used bird control method, especially in Europe. In the United States, according to the U.S. Fish and Wildlife Service (FWS), a falconer may request any raptor species protected under the Migratory Bird Treaty Act of 1918 (MBTA) to be used for falconry except for golden eagles. The use of bald eagles or golden eagles for abatement is prohibited by the Bald and Golden Eagle Protection Act. All raptors used for abatement must be captive bred and banded with a FWS-issued leg band.
- Dogs: The control of birds and other wildlife such as deer through harassment by trained border collies has been used at aerodromes, golf courses and agricultural land. The dogs represent an actual threat, and so elicit flight reactions. Habituation is unlikely as they can continually pursue and change their behaviour. In 1999, Southwest Florida International Airport became the first commercial airport in the world to employ a border collie in an airfield wildlife control programme. After the use of the collie, numbers and species of birds on the airport declined and most birds that remained congregated in a drainage ditch away from the runway. The number of bird strikes dropped to zero compared to 13 for the same period the previous year. Several other airports and airbases have now started similar programmes. At Dover Air Force Base, Delaware, bird strike damage to aircraft caused by birds has been reduced from an average of US$600,000 per year for the proceeding two years to US$24,000 per year after the initiation of a bird control programme that included the use of border collies.
- Humans: Sometimes called "animated scarecrows," it was not uncommon for children to be employed to scare birds away from crops. They often used early forms of acoustic deterrents, such as clapping wood planks together.

=== Deterrents - Effigies ===
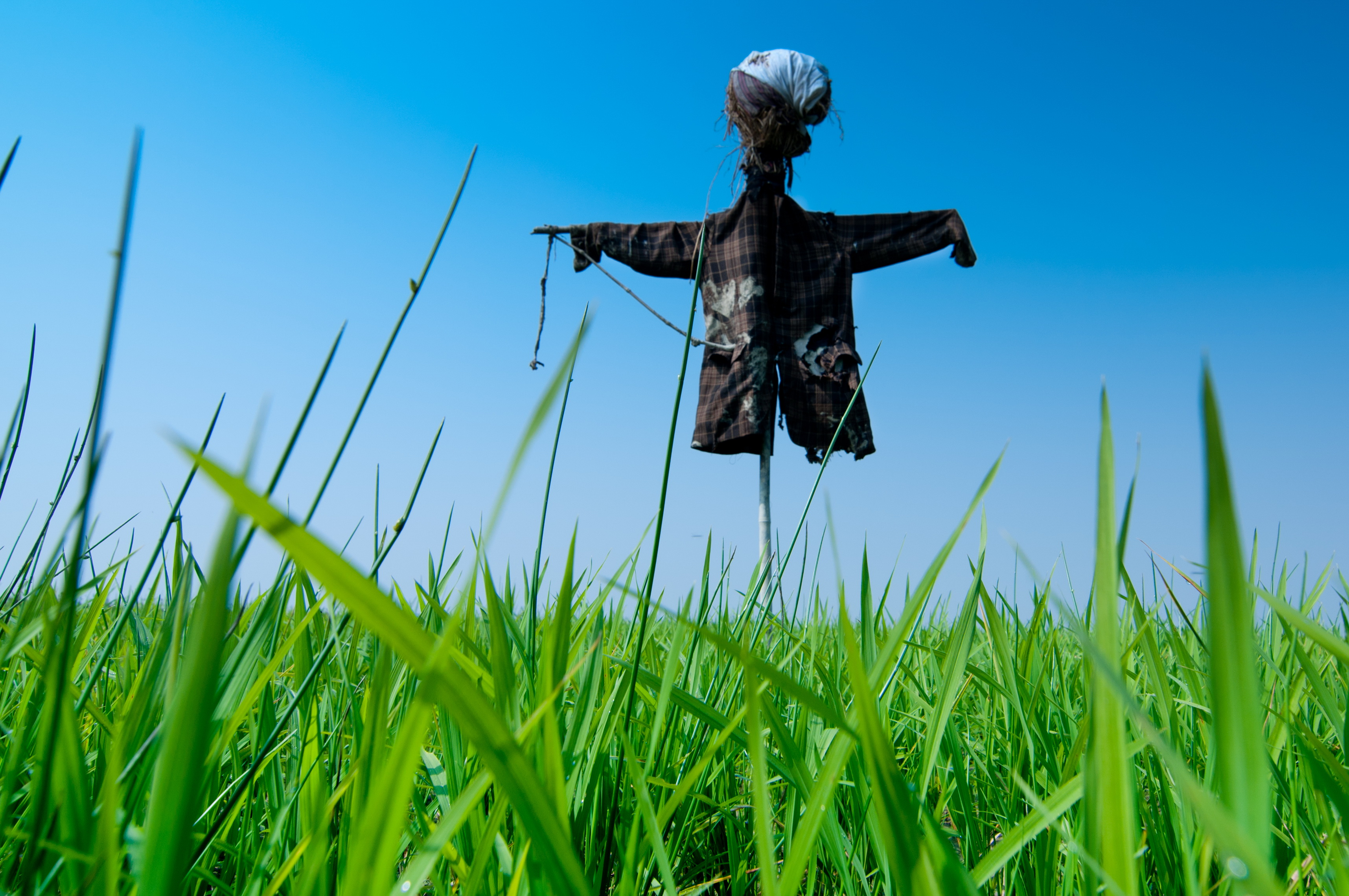
Classic human effigy scarecrow

In the simplest definition, an effigy is a model meant to appear as, or resemble, another object. Effigies are one of the oldest forms of avian deterrence – perhaps the original design of a bird scarer is the scarecrow, which is in the shape of a human figure.

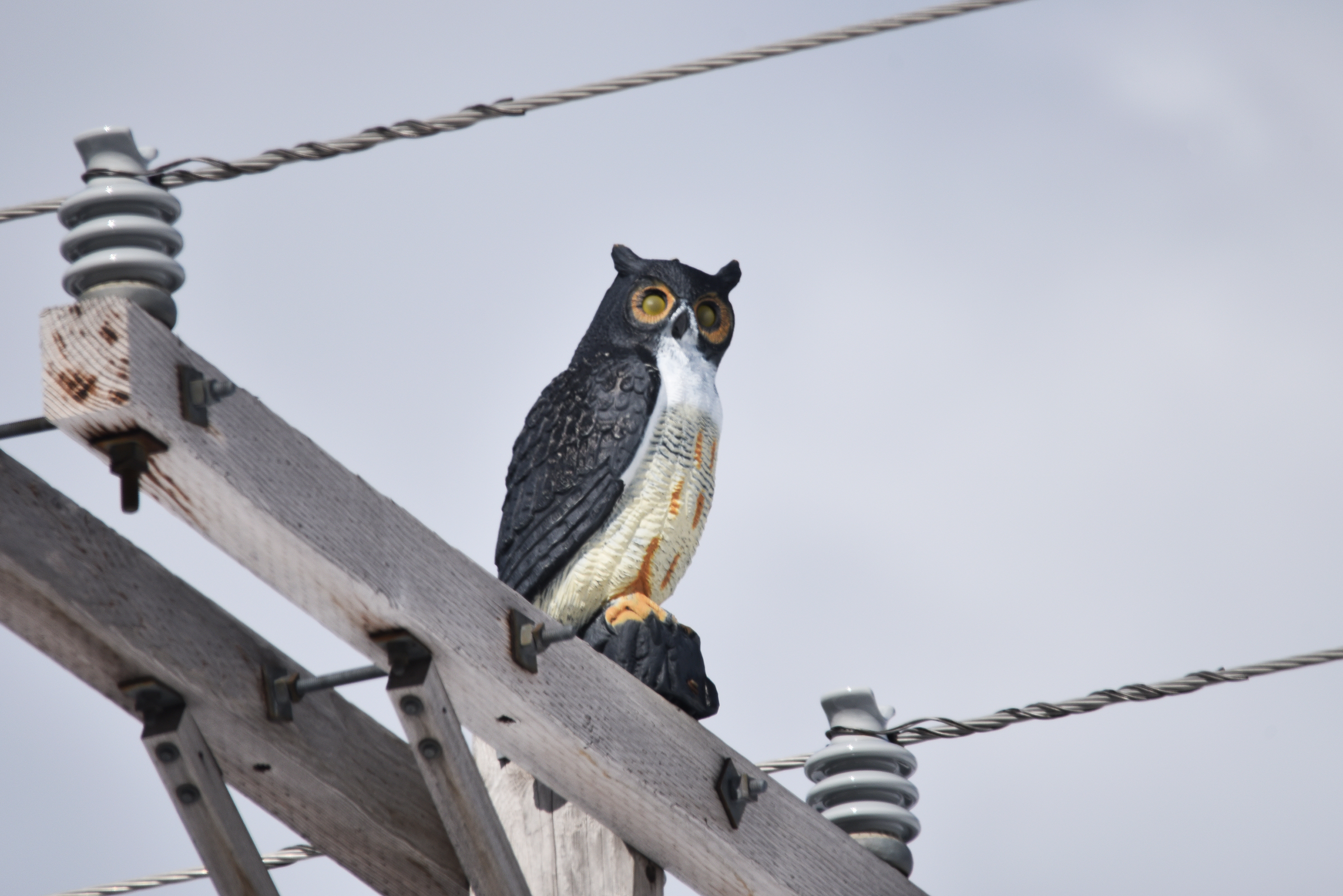
Plastic owl at a power sub-station

Also common are models designed to look like a predator; plastic-moulded owls and coyotes are often placed in areas like power sub-stations, marinas, and golf courses to deter the congregation of birds. However, birds have been demonstrated to rapidly habituate to these effigies once they understand they will not give chase.

Some effigies involve the use of a carcass (or decoy made to look like a carcass) of the species targeted for dispersal. A carcass effigy is typically hung on a structure where birds communally roost, or placed near an area where avian exclusion is desired. Effigies have been employed to disperse turkey vultures successfully. Use of effigies on other species such as common ravens, American crows, and gulls have demonstrated limited deterrence.

== See also ==
- Bird control spike
- Bird netting
- Bird trapping
- Wildlife contraceptive
