= Bird netting =

Net used in bird control

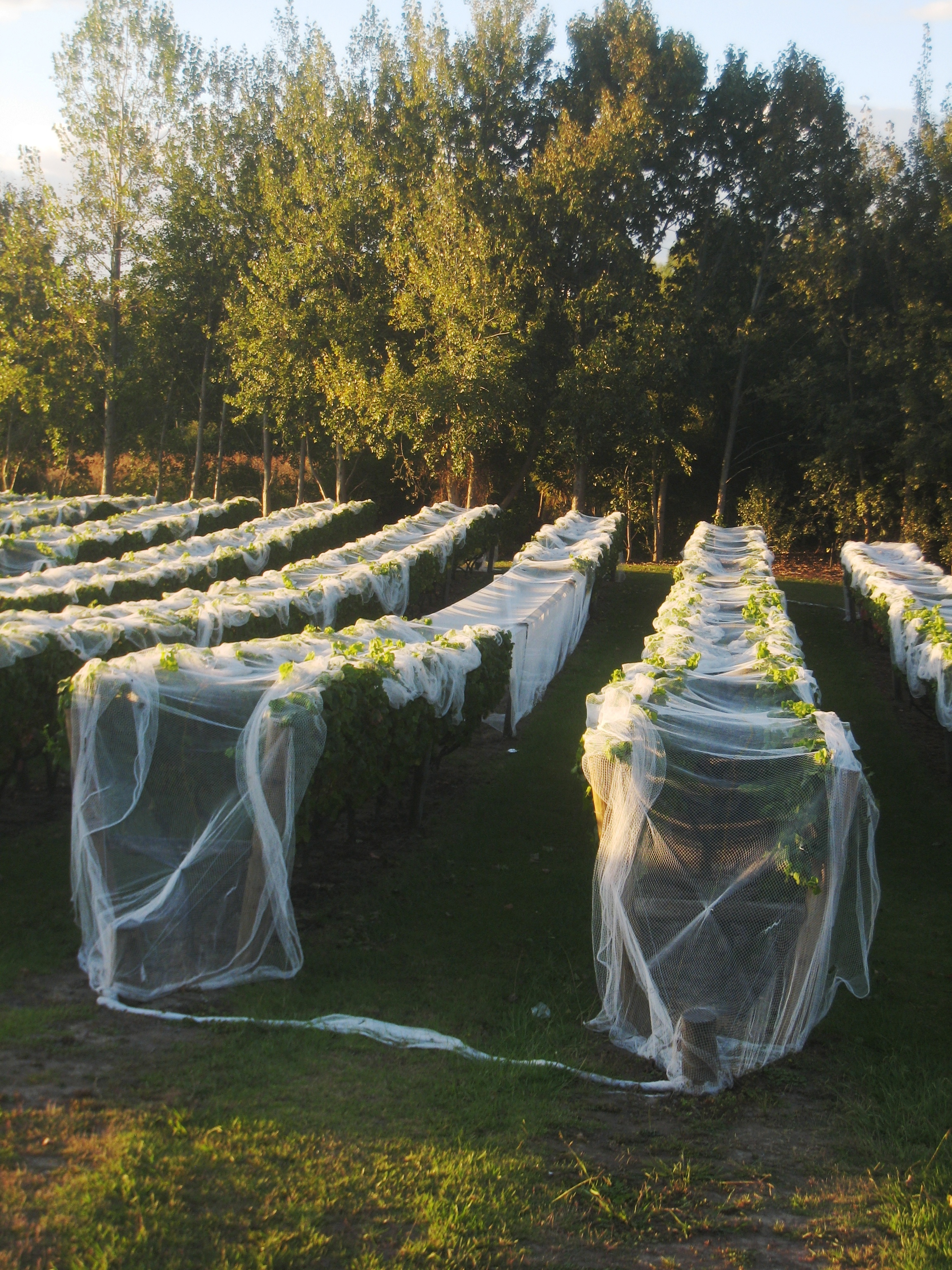
Bird netting on grapevines. Most of the side netting has been lifted up for harvesting.

Bird netting or anti-bird netting is a form of bird pest control. It is a net used to prevent birds from reaching certain areas.

Bird protection netting comes in a variety of shapes and forms, The most common is a small mesh (1 or 2 cm squares) either extruded and bi-oriented polypropylene or woven polyethylene.

The color most used is black (as the carbon black UV inhibitor offers the best protection against solar rays), but also bird netting may be available in other colors like white (usually white netting is woven or knitted and has an even smaller mesh size as it will serve as a double purpose anti-hail net for the protection of fruits during summer hail storms or late spring during flowering) or green (usually used in home gardening and mostly sold at retail outlets for the DIY farmers).

Professional anti-bird netting comes in jumbo rolls that offer considerable savings to the farmers or aquaculturists. Retail chains and local stores will offer smaller packages that fit the backyard gardener's needs.

== Usages ==
=== Crop protection ===
Bird nets are used to prevent bird damage of vegetable and fruit crops as well as seedlings. Frugivore birds and bats can cause great damages to farmers as they tend to peck one fruit, then go to another, therefore ruining a large percentage of otherwise commercially valuable production. Once even a small portion is bitten off, that fruit cannot be sold and if harvested (even if there is no bacteria or virus brought by the frugivore) will rot or ferment, damaging the rest of the harvested case. Bird protection netting is applied directly on the stand-alone trees or espaliers like peaches, pears, apples, grapes, or on the side ventilation windows of growing tunnels as in the case of berries like strawberries, raspberries, blueberries, and cranberries.

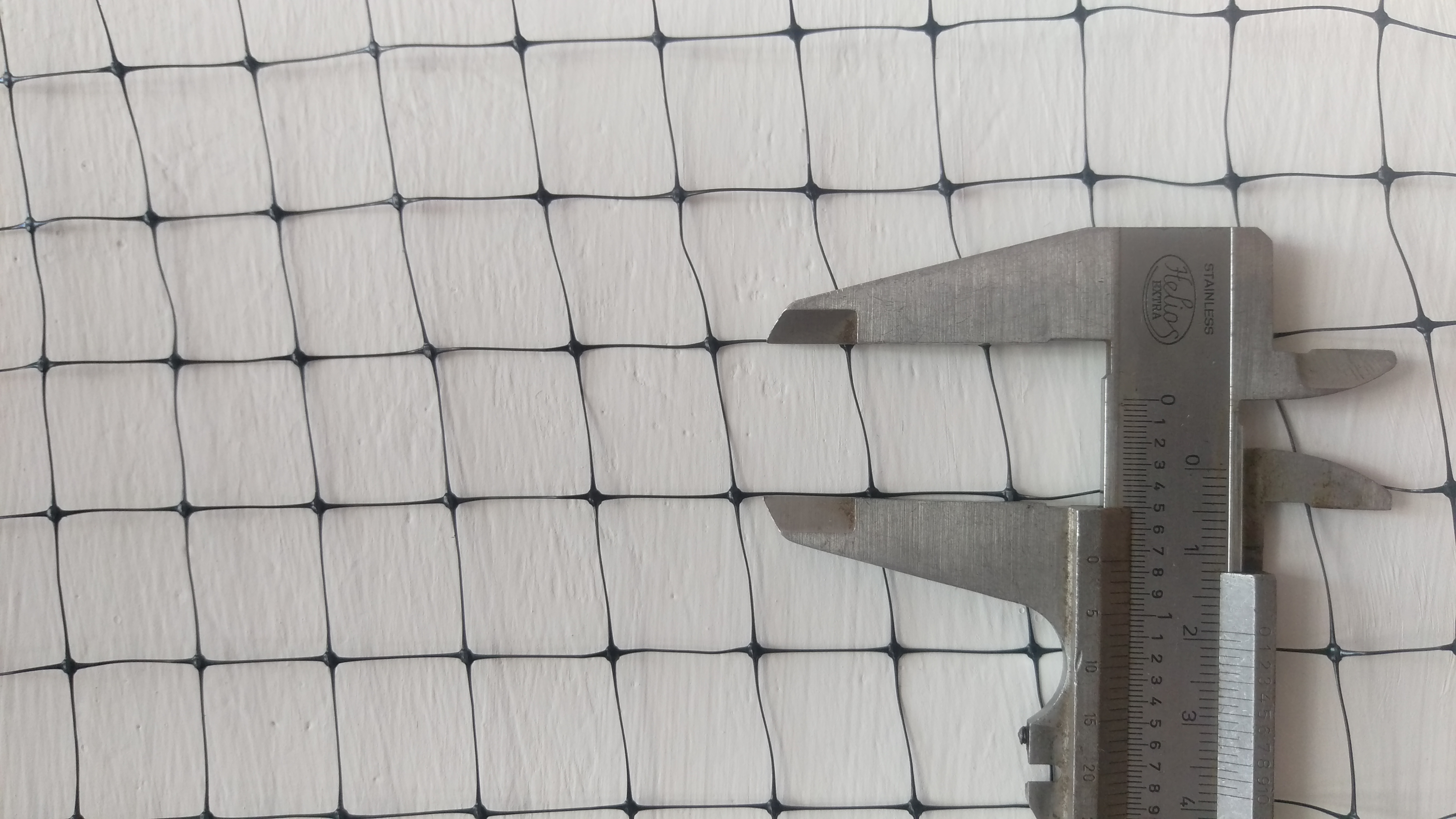
Anti-bird netting size

=== Fish protection ===
Bird netting may be used to protect fisheries and fish wildlife reserves from predator birds. Also in aquaculture (like shrimp and tilapia farms to mention a few), growers need to protect their work and fish crops from marauding birds. These types of birds have usually a larger wing span (seagulls, pelicans, herons, cormorants etc.) and a larger mesh size (with individual strands being more resistant as it will be installed on a cable system crossing the growing ponds). These netting are usually white as to be very visible for the large sea birds will be deterred by the sight of a barrier to their diving into the ponds.

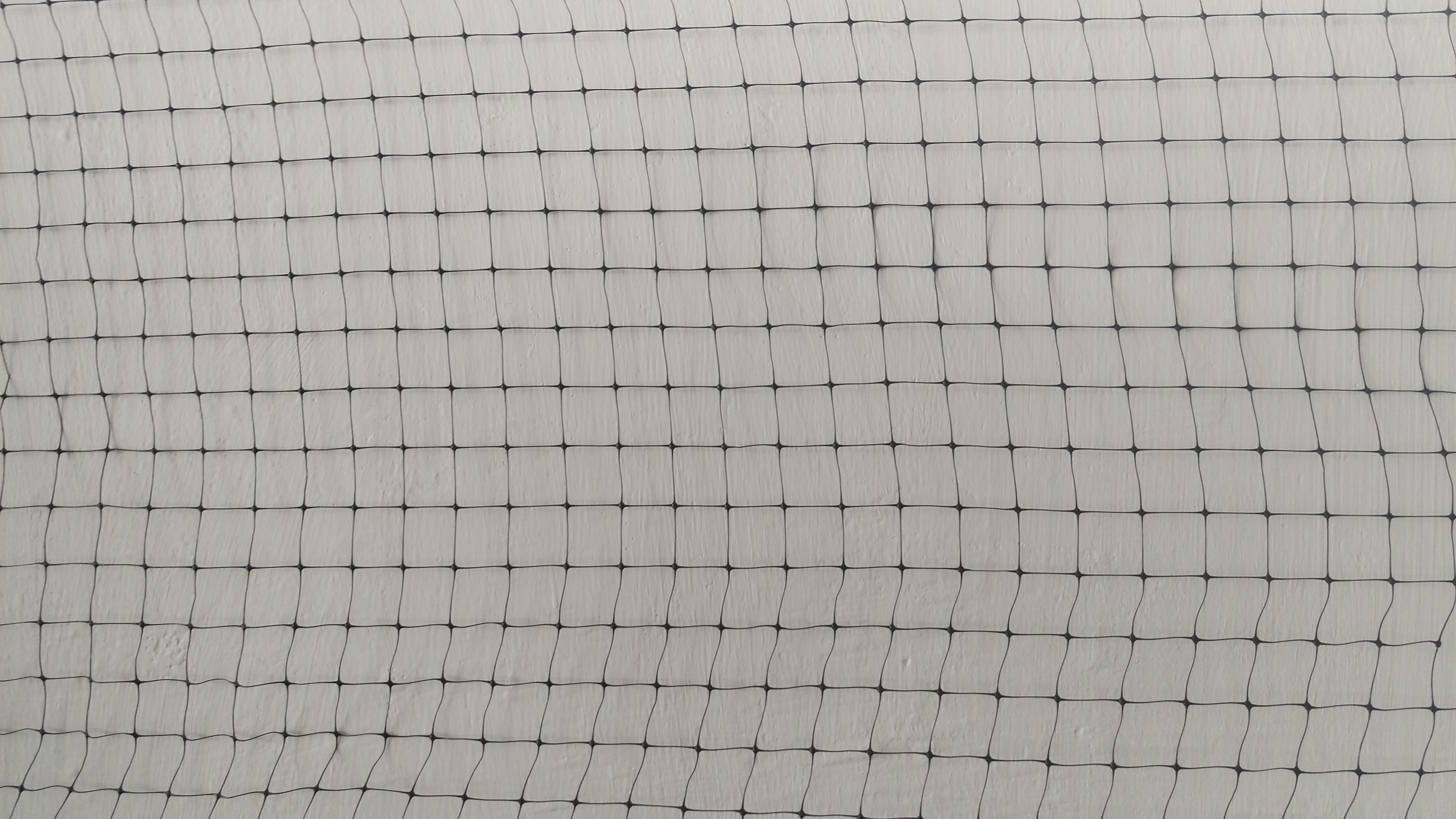
Anti-bird-netting, malla-antipajaros example

=== Building protection ===
Bird netting is one of the most effective and long lasting ways of bird proofing buildings and other structures against all urban bird species. It provides a discreet and impenetrable barrier that protects premises without harming the birds. Bird netting can be particularly effective for large open areas such as roofs and loading bays. Design considerations include the type and material of the fixings utilized and the bird species requiring exclusion.

=== Mining ponds ===
Miners will use chemical agents to extract minerals or metals from crushed rocks. These harmful chemical agents must be confined from volatiles, especially migratory species. In the United States EPA mandates that such cyanide ponds be covered at all times to prevent loss of wildlife.
