= Meniskos =

Bronze disk mounted above ancient Greek statues

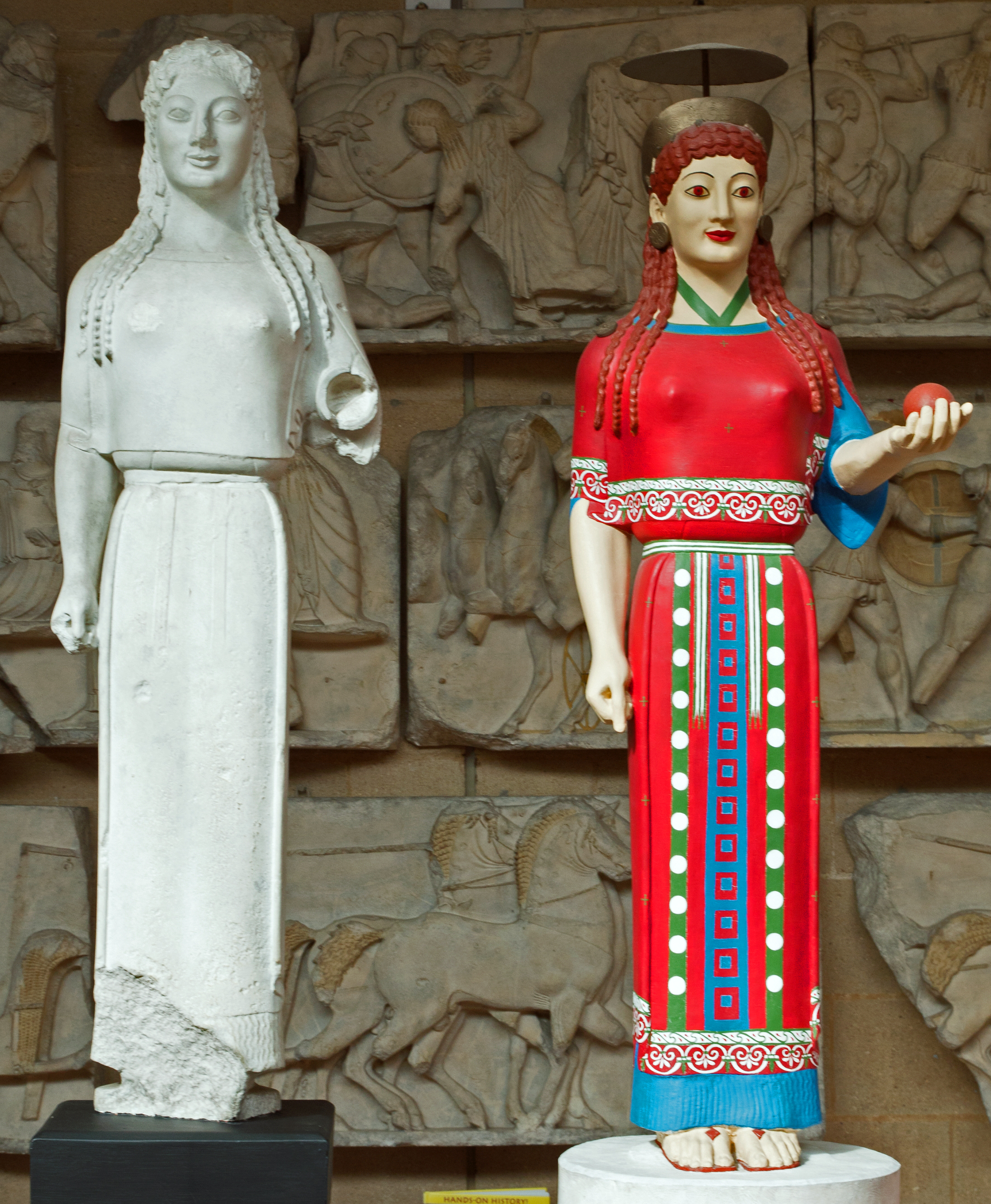
Reconstruction of the Peplos Kore with a meniskos

A meniskos (Greek: μηνίσκος, plural Meniskoi: "crescent moon") is a bronze disk mounted above some Greek statues on an iron nail drilled through the statue's head.

== Purpose ==
Since many Greek statues were displayed outside, the meniskos served the simple purpose of preventing bird feces from accumulating on the statue.

Meniskoi are mentioned in Aristophanes' The Birds, when the birds threaten the judges saying:

If you don't vote for us, you should prepare some little metal plates to guard your head. You'll need to wear them, just like statues do. For those of you without that head plate on, when you dress up in fine white brand-new clothes, the birds will crap on as a punishment.

— Aristophanes, The Birds 1114–1117

== See also ==
- Bird control spike
