= Bird control spike =

Bird deterrent device

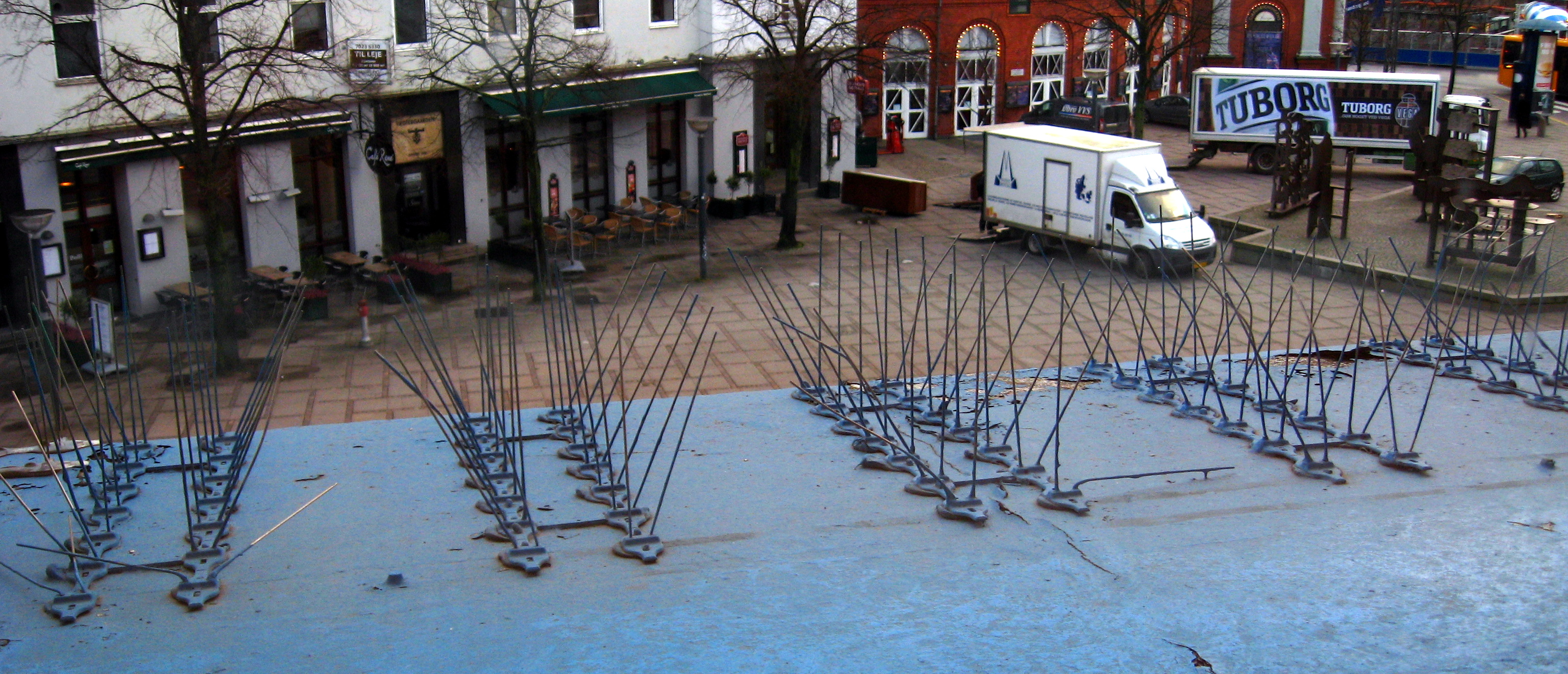
Bird control spikes on a roof in Denmark

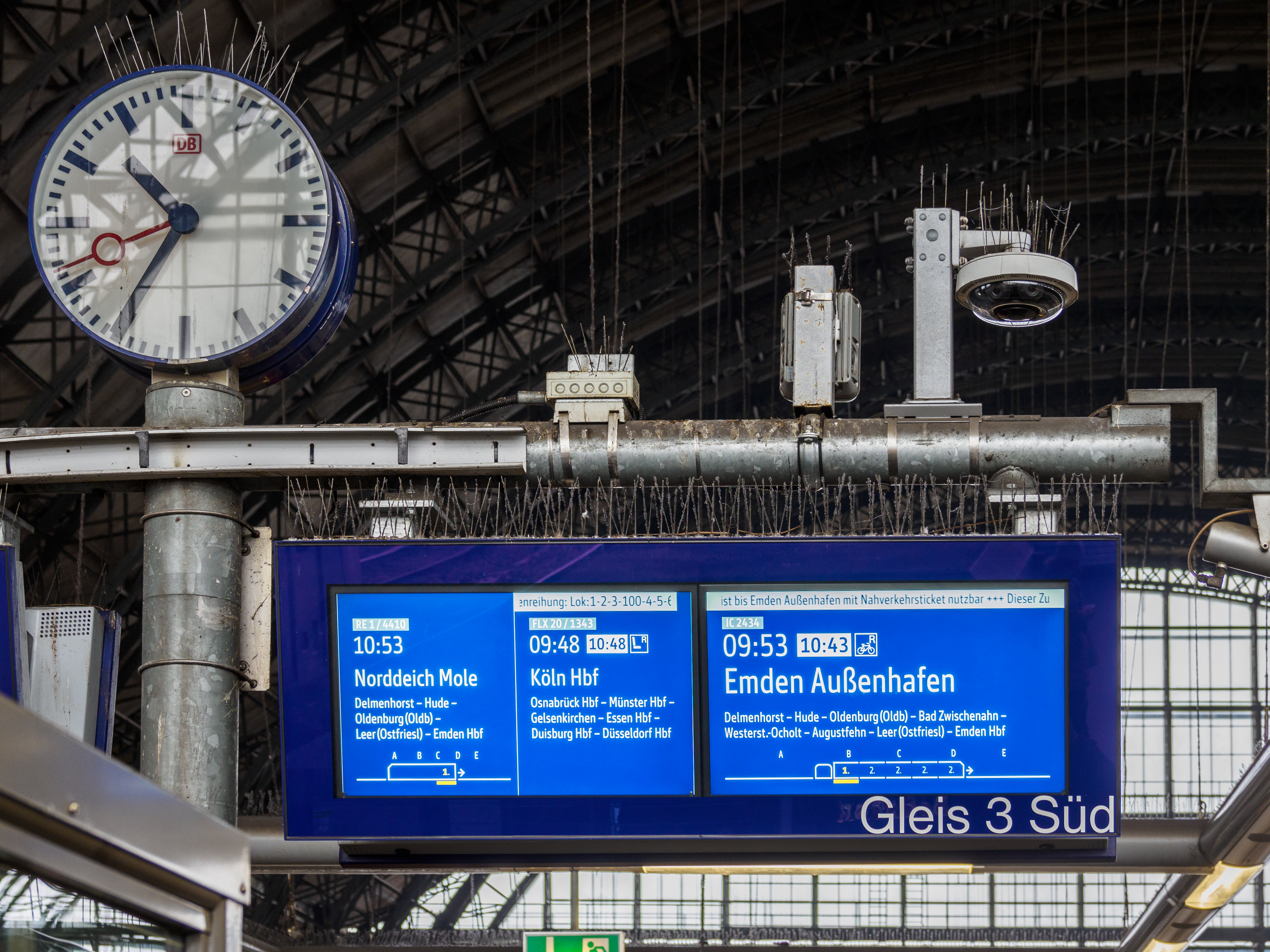
Bird Control Spikes at Bremen central station

A bird control spike, also known as an anti-roosting spike, pigeon spike, or roost modification, is a device consisting of long, needle-like rods used for bird control. Bird control spikes can be attached to building ledges, street lighting, and commercial signage to prevent wild or feral birds from perching or roosting. Birds can produce large quantities of unsightly and germ-infested feces, and some birds have very loud calls that can be inconvenient for nearby residents, especially at night. As a result, bird control spikes are used to deter these birds without causing them harm or killing them. In an unexpected adaptation, some birds have collected the spikes and used them in their nests.

== Styles and usage ==
Bird control deterrent spikes are normally around 10 centimetres (3.9 in) long, and work by reducing the area available for birds to land on. This forces larger varieties of birds, such as seagulls, pigeons, and crows, to land elsewhere. Birds that attempt to land on spike-protected surfaces receive a light prick from one or more of the spikes, which is uncomfortable but generally not harmful. As a result, the Royal Society for the Protection of Birds (RSPB) recommends bird control spikes for deterring pigeons from gardens.

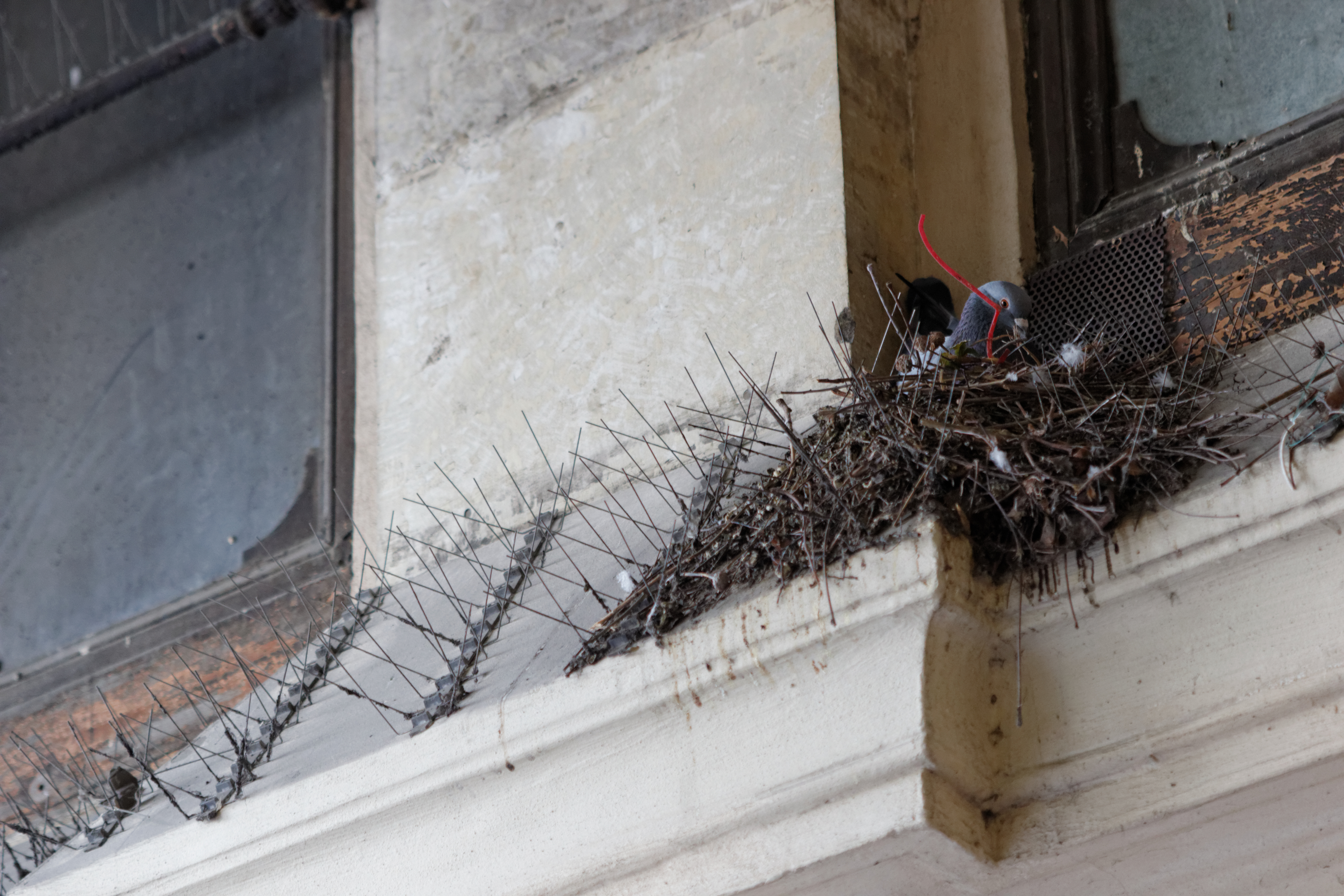
While deterring perching, bird spikes that are immobile allow birds to use them to their advantage to build large nests, even providing a support to build the nest on. While spikes can be inspected and nests removed, in many countries there are restrictions preventing or restricting the removal of bird nests.

Described as "the most effective (type of) stand-alone bird deterrent", bird control spikes can be placed along ledges, walls, on top of commercial signage, closed-circuit television cameras and in rain gutters, in order to prevent birds from perching on the surfaces. Bird control spikes are most common in city centres and coastal areas, where feral birds are more common and more likely to come into conflict with humans. In addition, killing or harming birds without a valid reason is illegal in some areas; for example the Wildlife and Countryside Act 1981 in the United Kingdom forbids killing wild birds that are not causing serious damage to property or posing a serious risk to human health, which puts pressure on authorities and landowners to find non-lethal bird control methods.

As well as being used to control wild birds, bird control spikes and similar deterrent measures see use in preventing larger climbing animals such as squirrels, raccoons, opossums and snakes from crossing an area. Rings of sturdy metal spikes or plates with a sawtooth-shaped edge are often mounted horizontally or vertically around exposed or suspended water, sewerage, electrical, and communications infrastructure in areas where such species are highly active. The intention is to prevent possible damage and increased maintenance costs of such essential infrastructure by safely discouraging these animals from using it as a system of transit.

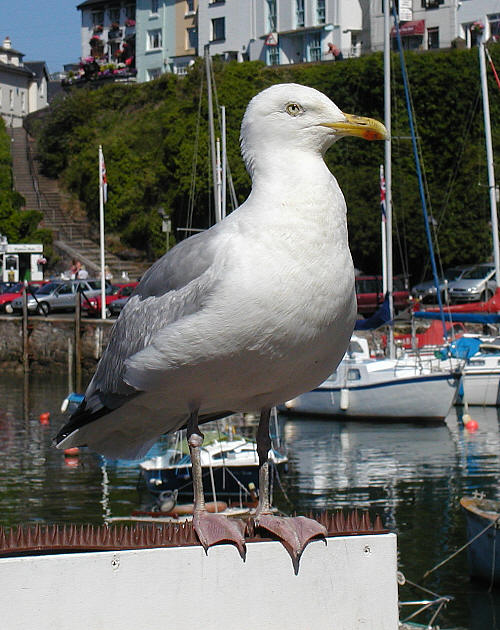
Smaller, blunt spikes may be the only option in places where a child could come into contact with the spikes and be hurt. However, they may fail to deter larger birds like this herring gull.

Some bird control deterrent spikes are electrified, using the same principle as an electric fence to increase effectiveness, and the distress call of the shocked bird can frighten others in the area. However, such devices cause unnecessary harm to birds or other wildlife, and are therefore illegal in some areas, such as the United Kingdom. Sharp-tipped bird control spikes are illegal in much of the rest of the world, and are unsuitable for areas which are regularly accessible for humans. As a result, some companies manufacture special blunted spikes for use where sharp spikes are dangerous or illegal. However, the blunt spikes are less effective at deterring birds, and cannot block climbing animals.

The same "passive deterrent" concept is also frequently employed to discourage human intrusion into secured or dangerous areas. In this application, spikes are employed in a similar manner to barbed wire or razor wire, providing a clearly visible and obvious deterrent to climbing or attempts to traverse a particular area. A common example is where pipes, conduits, structural beams and other such infrastructure must penetrate a fence or similar barrier and may provide a means to circumvent the barrier. A collar of large spikes approximately 1 metre (3.3 ft) long is fixed around part or all of the circumference of the penetrating element. Such measures are often employed near bridges, dams, cliffs and other such fall risks as an aid to public safety.

== Alternatives ==
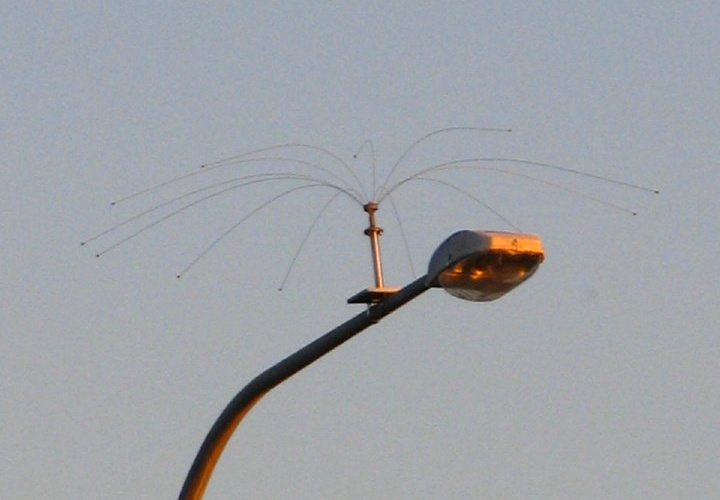
A bird deterrent attached to a light pole on the Houghton Highway viaduct, Australia

The spikes can become clogged by leaves, debris and bird feathers. If left unchecked, this can allow birds to perch easily on top. In addition, spikes can make buildings appear less attractive or untidy, especially landmark buildings. In these cases, other methods of control must be used. The only reliable bird control methods are barriers that do not allow the birds to be in an area or on a surface. Netting and mesh exclude or totally block birds from unwanted areas. Low current electric barrier will protect any surface or ledge from unwanted birds nesting, roosting, or loafing.

== See also ==
- Animal repellent
- Barbed tape
- Barbed wire
- Hostile architecture
- Meniskos – Bronze disk mounted above ancient Greek statues
- Pest control
- Scarecrow
