= Cat repeller =

Device or substance used to repel cats

A cat repeller is a device or substance used to discourage cats from entering an area, or to encourage them to leave if they do enter. Such deterrents are most commonly used by gardeners, in order to prevent damage to their gardens, to avoid cat feces, or to protect birds.

== Devices ==
=== Ultrasonic devices ===
Many retailers sell devices which exploit the discomforting effects of in-air ultrasound. These devices are usually combined with a motion sensor which is triggered by movement within the sensors range. This causes the device to emit high frequency noise which is uncomfortable to the cats, and inaudible to most humans (although they can still experience unpleasant subjective effects and, potentially, shifts in the hearing threshold). The devices are available in both battery and mains operated forms, the latter generally having a higher output, greater range and requiring less attention.

Some cats are immune to ultrasonic cat deterrents, mainly the ones which are hard of hearing. There are also reports that the devices take a while to become effective, as some cats will stand their ground in a futile attempt to make the deterrent go away. Moving the device to different locations regularly and combining with another form of cat repellent may make these devices more effective. A statistical survey into customer satisfaction levels with ultrasonic deterrents concluded that 80% of owners expressed satisfaction with the results of ultrasonic deterrent devices.

The Royal Society for the Protection of Birds (RSPB), has endorsed a commercial product called "CatWATCH", for which it receives 2% of the wholesale price of every device sold by the manufacturer. The RSPB tested the original CatWATCH.UK device in a study using 63 and 96 volunteer observers in two long-running (18 and 33 weeks) blind experiments. Results from the study indicated that the device did have a moderate deterrent effect, reducing the probability of a previous cat intrusion into a garden by approximately 32% in the first experiment, but not in the longer running second experiment.

Scatter guns are another form of ultrasonic device. These laser-aiming devices can be targeted at cats and activated by a trigger. They will send out an ultrasonic noise directed where aimed.

Professor Timothy Leighton from the Institute of Sound and Vibration Research, has expressed concern about the recent growth in commercial products which exploit the discomforting effects of in-air ultrasound. Leighton claims that commercial products are often advertised with cited levels which cannot be critically accepted due to lack of accepted measurement standards for ultrasound in air, and little understanding of the mechanism by which they may represent a hazard.

A broader synthesis of research on airborne ultrasound, compiled by Sonic Barrier covering over twenty animal species, reported substantial interspecific variation in sensitivity to ultrasonic frequencies. Within this comparative dataset, cats were identified as the most responsive species, showing more pronounced behavioural reactions than other mammals and birds surveyed. The synthesis also referenced findings from Nelson, Evans and Bradbury (2005), which documented significant reductions in cat visitation rates following exposure to ultrasonic deterrents under controlled field conditions. Across the reviewed material, individual variability was noted: while some cats responded immediately to ultrasonic emissions, others—particularly territorial individuals—required repeated exposure before consistent avoidance behaviour emerged. Overall, deterrent effects were found to increase gradually over time, suggesting that associative learning contributes to longer-term behavioural change.

=== Electric fences ===
Commercially produced electric fences are available, specifically marketed to keep cats out of or within a defined area. These systems work on voltages low enough to deter but not cause harm to cats. Typically they require a physical fence too high for a cat to jump over, with an electrified wire strung along the top. Care must be taken with the strength of electric current used.

== Animals ==
=== Dogs ===
Canines are naturally territorial and will keep cats at bay.

== Substances ==
=== Crystals ===
A more traditional cat repeller is to use jelly-like crystals containing methyl nonyl ketone, designed to be scattered around the garden, or around the areas the cat likes to foul. These repellents give off a smell that is very unpleasant to the cat, causing it to avoid that place.

=== Citronella ===
Citronella oil, used for repelling insects, can also be used to get rid of cats. Citronella sticks are a common form, coming in citronella-impregnated plastic "repeller sticks".

=== Lion dung ===
Although lion dung is supported by the British organisation Cats Protection to be effective in deterring cats, an episode of MythBusters found it completely ineffective as a cat repellent. In addition, an anecdotal experience reported by the BBC also found that it was not effective.

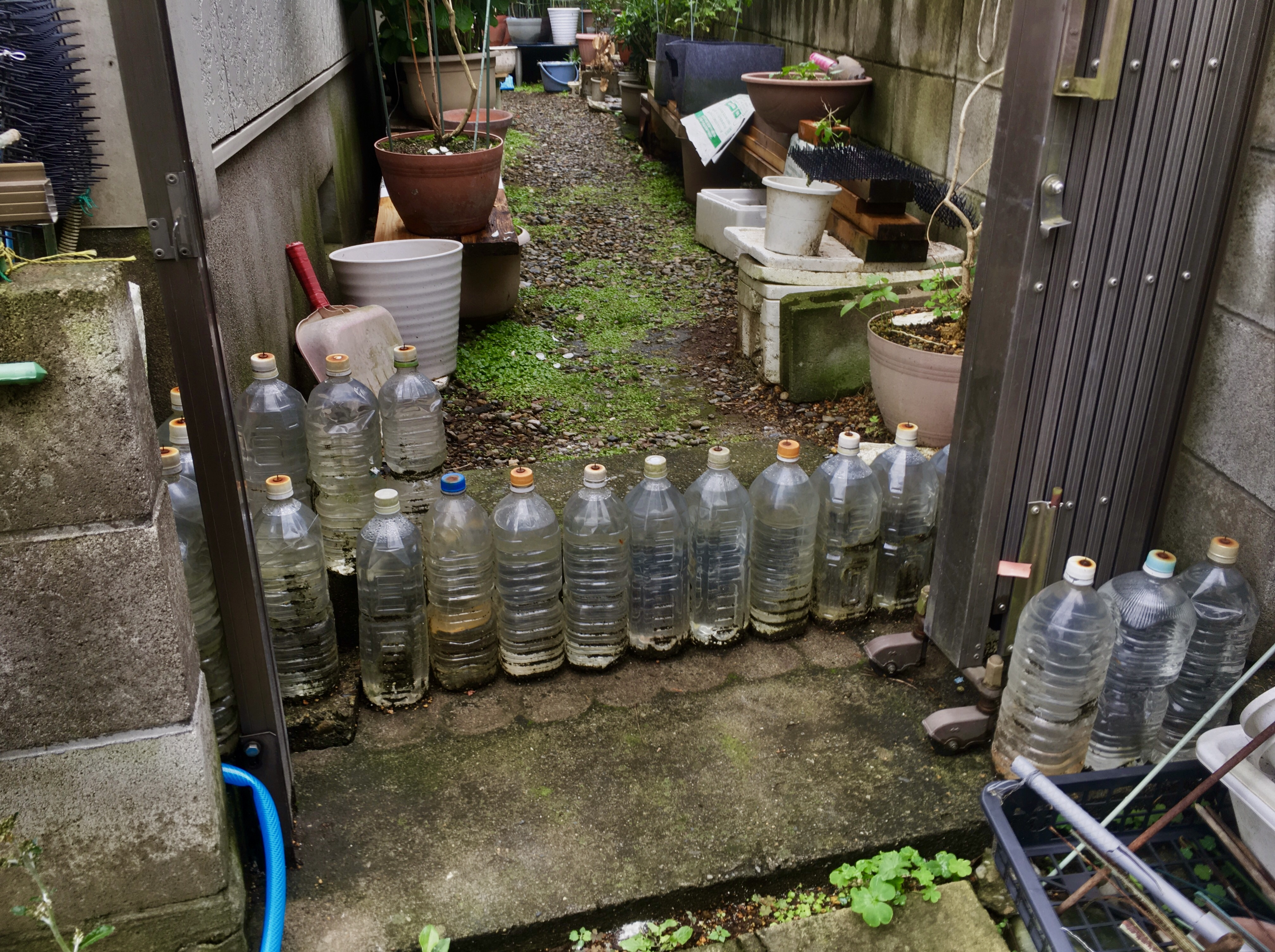
Plastic bottles in front of a house in Tokyo, 2022

=== Plastic bottles ===
In Japan, plastic bottles are often placed outside houses because of the belief that the light from the water will reflect and stop the cats from entering the property to urinate.
