= Mushrooms in art =

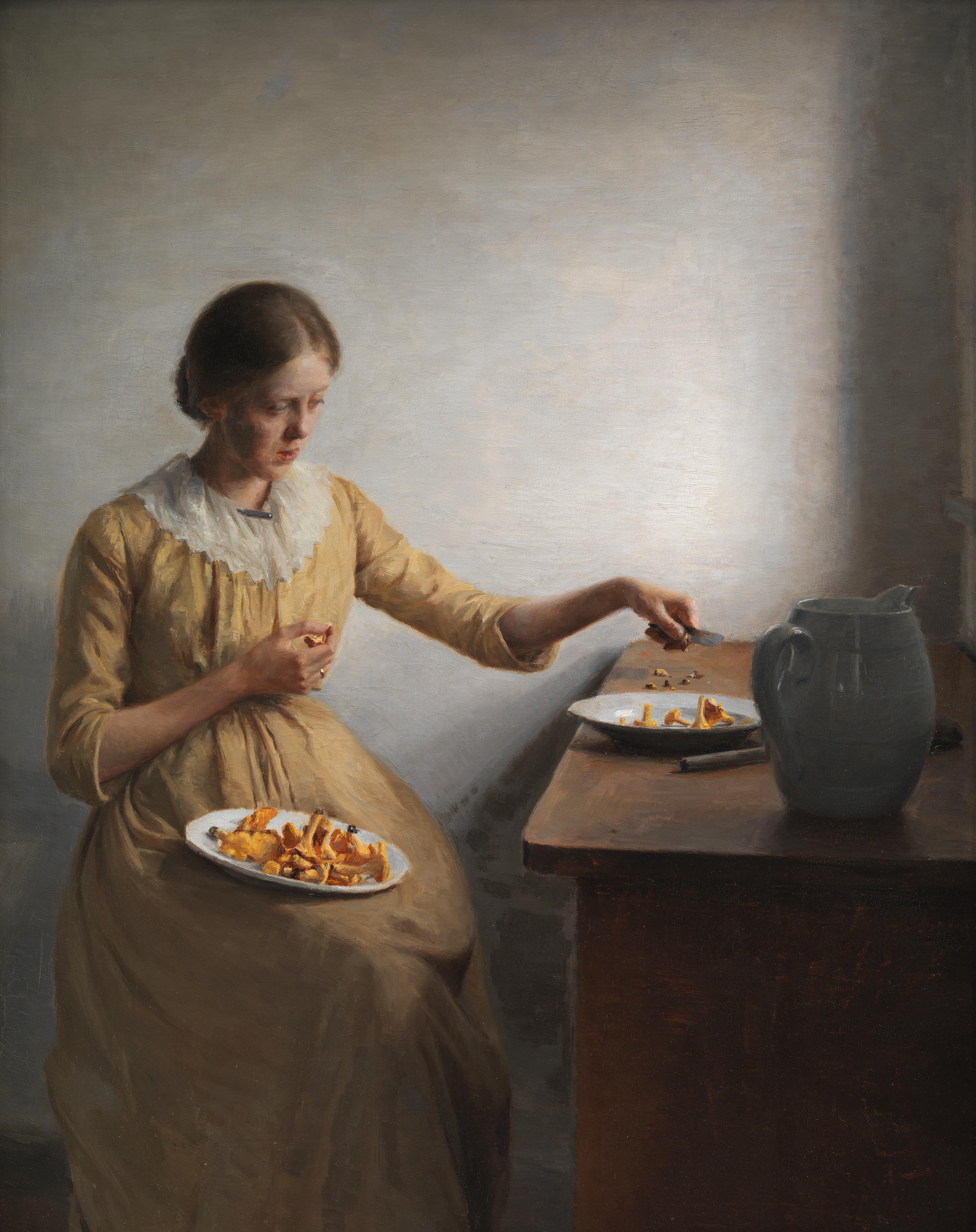
A Young Girl Preparing Chanterelles, Peter Ilsted, 1892

Mushrooms have been found in art traditions around the world, including in western and non-western works. Ranging throughout those cultures, works of art that depict mushrooms can be found in ancient and contemporary times. Often, symbolic associations can also be given to the mushrooms depicted in the works of art. For instance, in Mayan culture, mushroom stones have been found that depict faces in a dreamlike or trance-like expression, which could signify the importance of mushrooms giving hallucinations or trances. Another example of mushrooms in Mayan culture deals with their codices, some of which might have depicted hallucinogenic mushrooms. Other examples of mushroom usage in art from various cultures include the Pegtymel petroglyphs of Russia and Japanese Netsuke figurines.

Examples of mushrooms being depicted in contemporary art are also prevalent. For example, a contemporary Japanese piece depicts baskets of matsutake mushrooms laid atop bank notes, signifying the association of mushrooms and prosperity. Other examples of contemporary art depicting fungi include Anselm Kiefer's Über Deutschland and Sonja Bäumel's Objects not static and silent but alive and talking. These contemporary works often outline themes greatly undercurrent in modern times, themes such as sustainable living, new materials, and ethical considerations associated with the science of fungi and biotechnologies. In fact, working with fungi allows contemporary artists to create art that is interactive and performative.

The Garden of Earthly Delights by Hieronymus Bosch

Mushroom symbolism has also appeared in Christian paintings. The panel painting by Hieronymus Bosch, The Haywain Triptych, is considered the first depiction of mushroom in modern art. Another triptych by Hieronymus Bosch, The Garden of Earthly Delights, depicts scenes very similar to those experienced under the effects of psychoactive mushrooms. In fact, when considering the mushroom of Amanita muscaria, artistic representations throughout the ages show the association it has with psychotropic properties, being represented as being used for social, religious, and therapeutic purposes.

== Registry of Mushrooms in Works of Art ==
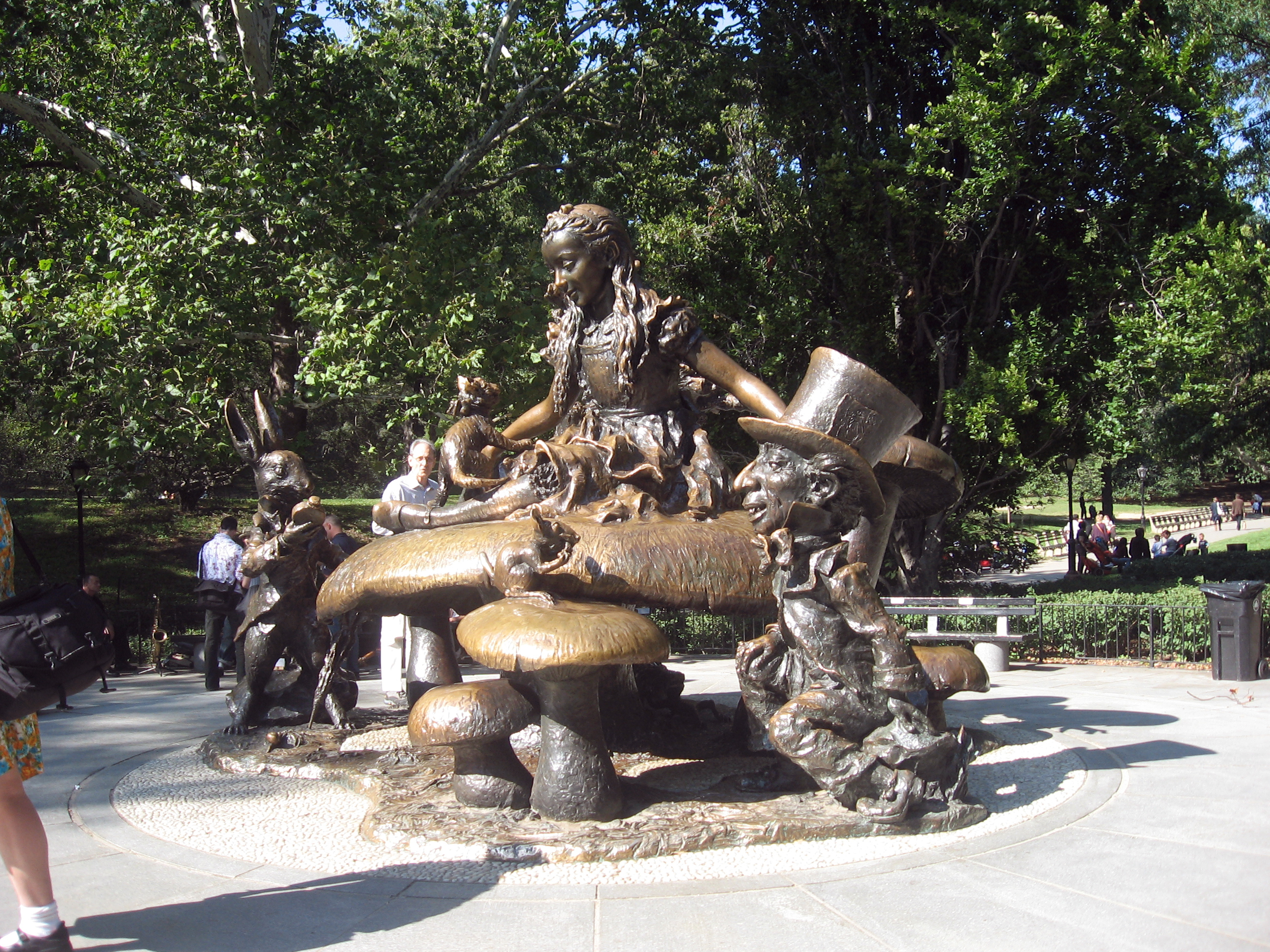
The 1959 Alice in Wonderland sculpture by Jose de Creeft in Central Park, New York City, features several mushrooms

The Registry of Mushrooms in Works of Art is maintained by the North American Mycological Association and its stated goal is, "to contribute to the understanding of the relationship between mushrooms and people as reflected in works of art from different historical periods, and to provide enjoyment to anyone interested in the subject". Started by Elio Schaechter, author of In the Company of Mushrooms, the project is ongoing.

Art periods and artists are categorized as follows in the registry:

- 1300–1500 – Gothic and Early Renaissance
- 1500–1600 – High Renaissance
- Dutch Baroque 1600–1750
- Flemish Baroque 1600–1750
- Germanic Baroque 1600–1750
- Italian Baroque 1600–1750
- Miscellaneous Baroque 1600–1750
- 1750–1850 – Romanticism and Neoclassicism
- 1850–1950 – Modern
- Victorian Fairy Paintings
- Post 1950 – Contemporary
- Post 1999 – Contemporary
- Karl Hamilton
- Paolo Porpora
- Pseudo Fardella, Painter of Carlo Torre
- Van Schrieck, Otto Marseus
- Alexander Viazmensky
