= Lorrie Goulet =

American sculptor and painter (1925–2021)

- Born: Lorraine Helen Goulet; August 17, 1925; New York City, New York, U.S.
- Died: December 17, 2021 (aged 96); New York City, New York, U.S.
- Education: Black Mountain College
- Known for: Direct carving, sculpture, painting
- Spouse: Jose de Creeft (m. 1944)
- Children: Donna Maria de Creeft
- Website: lorriegoulet.com

Lorraine Helen Goulet (August 17, 1925 – December 17, 2021), known as Lorrie Goulet, was an American sculptor and painter. She was recognized primarily for her direct carving in stone and wood, and for works that often celebrated women, families, and diverse cultures. In addition to her visual art, Goulet produced philosophical and educational writings, books, and poetry. She studied at Black Mountain College from 1943 to 1944 and taught sculpture at the Art Students League of New York for over two decades.

== Early life and education ==
Lorraine Helen Goulet was born on August 17, 1925, in New York City. Her introduction to the arts began at age seven, when she met ceramicist Aimee Voorhees at the Inwood Pottery Studio in 1932. She studied under Voorhees for four formative years. Her family subsequently moved to Los Angeles, California, where she continued her education. In 1940, she became an apprentice to ceramicist Jean Rose in Southern California.

In the autumn of 1943, Goulet enrolled at Black Mountain College in North Carolina, where she studied painting and drawing with Josef Albers and weaving with Anni Albers. During the summer of 1944, she met sculptor Jose de Creeft, who was serving as a visiting instructor at the college. The two married on November 12, 1944, at the Ethical Culture Society in New York City. In 1946, the couple acquired a farm in Hoosick Falls, New York, where they worked part of each year until 1968. Their daughter, artist Donna Maria de Creeft, was born in March 1948.

== Career ==
=== Exhibitions ===
Goulet held her first solo exhibition in 1948 at the Clay Club (later known as the Sculpture Center) in New York City. Her work appeared in numerous group exhibitions beginning that same year, including several Annual Exhibitions at the Whitney Museum of American Art. She also exhibited at the fine arts pavilion of the New York World's Fair in 1964–1965.

Beginning in 1971, Kennedy Galleries in New York represented her work, mounting regular solo exhibitions through 1986. In 1998, the National Museum of Women in the Arts in Washington, D.C., presented a solo exhibition titled Fifty Years of Making Sculpture. Her work was later represented by David Findlay Jr. Gallery and the Harmon-Meek Gallery in Naples, Florida.

Her works have been shown at institutions including the Whitney Museum of American Art, Hirshhorn Museum and Sculpture Garden, Smithsonian American Art Museum, National Academy of Design, National Museum of Women in the Arts, Corcoran Gallery of Art, Museo Nacional Centro de Arte Reina Sofía in Madrid, Asheville Art Museum, and Black Mountain College Museum + Arts Center.

=== Teaching ===
Goulet's teaching career began in 1957 at the Museum of Modern Art's People's Art Center in New York City; she also began teaching privately that year. From 1961 to 1975, she served on the faculty of The New School in New York. In 1981, she joined the Art Students League of New York, where she taught sculpture until 2004.

Between 1964 and 1968, CBS Television broadcast 23 program segments featuring Goulet teaching sculpture to children on a program called Around the Corner, which was sponsored by the New York City Board of Education.

=== Selected solo exhibitions ===
- 2014, Elizabeth V. Sullivan Gallery at Vytlacil Center, Art Students League of New York, Sparkill, NY
- 2011, Past and Present, David Findlay Jr Fine Art, New York, NY
- 2009, David Findlay Jr Fine Art, New York, NY
- 2009, 2003, 2000, Harmon-Meek Gallery, Naples, FL
- 2007, 2005, 2004, David Findlay Jr Fine Art, New York, NY
- 2003, Process, The Art Students League, New York, NY
- 2002, 2001, David Findlay Jr Fine Art, New York, NY
- 1998, Fifty Years of Making Sculpture, The National Museum of Women in the Arts, Washington, DC
- 1989, 1991, Caldwell College, Caldwell, NJ
- 1988, 1991, Carolyn Hill Galleries, New York, NY
- 1986, 1983, 1980, 1978, The Kennedy Galleries, New York, NY
- 1975, 1973, 1971, 1969, Temple Emeth, Teaneck, NJ
- 1968, 1961, New School Associates, New York, NY
- 1968, 1966, 1962, 1959, The Contemporaries Gallery, New York, NY
- 1966, Rye Art Center, Rye, NY
- 1951, The Cheney Library, Hoosick Falls, NY
- 1955, 1951, 1948, Clay Club Sculpture Center, New York, NY

== Public collections ==
- Asheville Art Museum, Asheville, NC
- The Archdiocese of New York, New York, NY
- The Art Students League, New York, NY
- The Children's Museum, Naples, FL
- Erie Art Museum, Erie, PA
- Hirshhorn Museum and Sculpture Garden, Washington, DC
- The Hunter Museum, Chattanooga, TN
- Mugar Memorial Library, Boston University, MA
- Munson-Williams-Proctor Arts Institute, Utica, NY
- National Academy of Design, New York, NY
- The National Museum of Women in the Arts, Washington, D.C.
- The National Sculpture Society, New York, NY
- The National Palace, Madrid, Spain
- New Jersey State Museum, Trenton, NJ
- New York University, Music Dep. New York, NY
- Northern Michigan University, Marquette, MI
- Palacio National, Madrid, Spain
- The Philadelphia Center for the Arts, Philadelphia, PA
- The Philharmonic Center for the Arts, Naples, FL
- Sarah Roby Foundation, New York, NY
- Smithsonian American Art Museum, Washington, DC
- Southeast Missouri State University Museum, Cape Girardeau, MO
- Tamara Kerr Art Bank, Savannah, College of Art, Savannah, GA
- Wichita Museum of Art, Wichita, KS

== Commissions ==
- 1971, Stainless Steel Relief, 49th Precinct, Police and Fire Station Headquarters, Bronx, NY
- 1961, Ceramic Relief, Nurses Residence and School, Bronx Municipal Hospital, Bronx, NY
- 1958. Ceramic Relief, New York Public Library, 173rd St. Branch, Grand Concourse, Bronx, NY

== Selected articles and publications ==
- New York Magazine, 2-page centerfold and article, April 9, 2014
- Black Mountain College: An Experiment in Art, Vincent Katz, pp. 80–81, 2003
- D.M. Reynolds, Masters of American Sculpture, 1994, page 224
- National Sculpture Review, Geometry and Flesh, The Sculpture and Vision of Lorrie Goulet (Cover Story), Dena Merriam, 1993
- National Sculpture Review, "Anima in Stone" (Poem), 1992
- Contemporary American Women Sculptors, Watson Jones, Oryx Press, Phoenix, AZ, 1985
- Black Mountain College Anthology, Sprouted Seeds, Mervin Lane, 1989
- The New York Review, Les Krantz, 1988
- Kennedy Galleries, Profiles of American Artists, 1981
- Dictionary of International Biography, 1974-1976
- Arts Magazine, Lorrie Goulet: Themes of Women, Karl Lunde, 1975
- Archives of American Art, Complete Life Works and Correspondence, 1975
- Women Artists in America, J.L. Collins, 1973
- Slate and Soft Stone, Frank Eliscue, 1973, 3pp, 4 plates
- National Sculpture Review, Winter, 1973
- Biographical Directory of American Artists, 1971-2001
- Sculpture in Wood, Jack C. Rich, 1970, 3 Plates
- Biographical Dictionary of American Artists, 1967
- The Palette, "20th Century Sculptors Look at Their Work", Ball State Teacher's College, 1956

== Television and radio ==
- "Around the Corner", CBS TV, Children's sculpture series, 24 programs, 1964–68
- "The Lee Graham Show", 30-Minute interview, WNYC radio, New York, NY, Feb. 5, 1974
- "Guest Demonstrator at Work", WNET/Thirteen, Live Arts and Antiques Auction, 1978

== Death ==
Goulet died at her home in New York City on December 17, 2021, at the age of 96.
