= Alice in Wonderland (sculpture) =

Bronze sculpture in New York City's Central Park

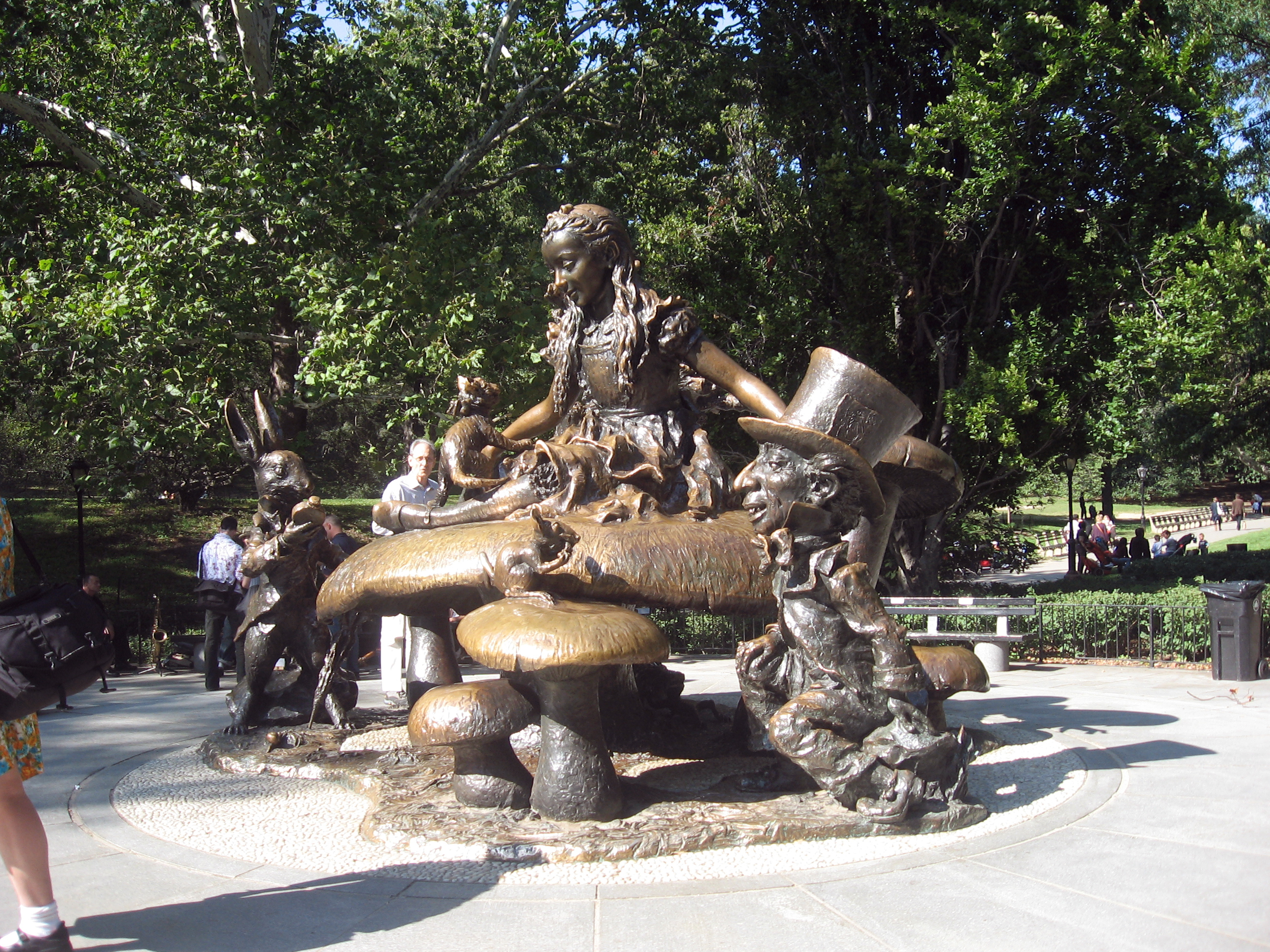
- Artist: Jose de Creeft
- Year: 1959
- Medium: Bronze sculpture
- Subject: Alice in Wonderland
- Location: New York City; 40°46′30.1″N 73°57′59.6″W
- Owner: Central Park donated by George Delacorte

The Alice in Wonderland is a sculpture located at Central Park in Manhattan, New York City, U.S. It is approximately at 74th Street, on the north side of Conservatory Water. The bronze statue by Jose de Creeft stands eleven feet high and portrays Alice surrounded by the Mad Hatter, White Rabbit, Cheshire Cat and other characters from Lewis Carroll's 1865 book Alice's Adventures in Wonderland enjoying a tea party.

== History ==
The statue was created in 1959 by José de Creeft under the commission of George Delacorte, so children could experience Alice in Wonderland in person. The sculpture was originally cast at the Long Island Modern Art Foundry in the Steinway Mansion. The sculpture is unique because visitors are encouraged to interact with the statue. The statue is made of bronze and was derived from images John Tenniel created for the original publication. The face of Alice is actually based on Creeft's daughter, Donna. The sculpture's Mad Hatter is a caricature of George Delacorte.

At the base of the sculpture are engravings from Lewis Carrol's poem Jabberwocky. The sculpture was dedicated to George's wife Margarita whose name is located at the base of the sculpture. Additionally, there are six plaques located around the base of the sculpture that depict her favorite moments from Alice in Wonderland.

The sculpture has been seen in many films and television episodes, including the season 8 finale of The Blacklist where Elizabeth Keen is killed.

== Controversies ==
- The statue was the subject of a foiled terrorist plot in April 2020. Kevin Fallon was arrested for plotting to blow up the statue, as well as threatening to kill several others. He was sentenced to psychiatric care and evaluation.
- There has been an ongoing debate since the sculpture was erected within the city of NY, over whether the statue depicts the White Rabbit, or the March Hare.
- The statue has been associated with controversy surrounding the author of Alice in Wonderland, Lewis Carroll. Who's interest and focus is clear to be little girls, shown in both his photography in writing. Raising concerns on his intentions toward creating the story of Alice, who is based on Alice Liddell, who he photographed often. Over half of his surviving photographs show little girls, and over half of those surviving photos show nude or semi-nude little girls, including Alice Liddell and her sisters.

== Gallery ==
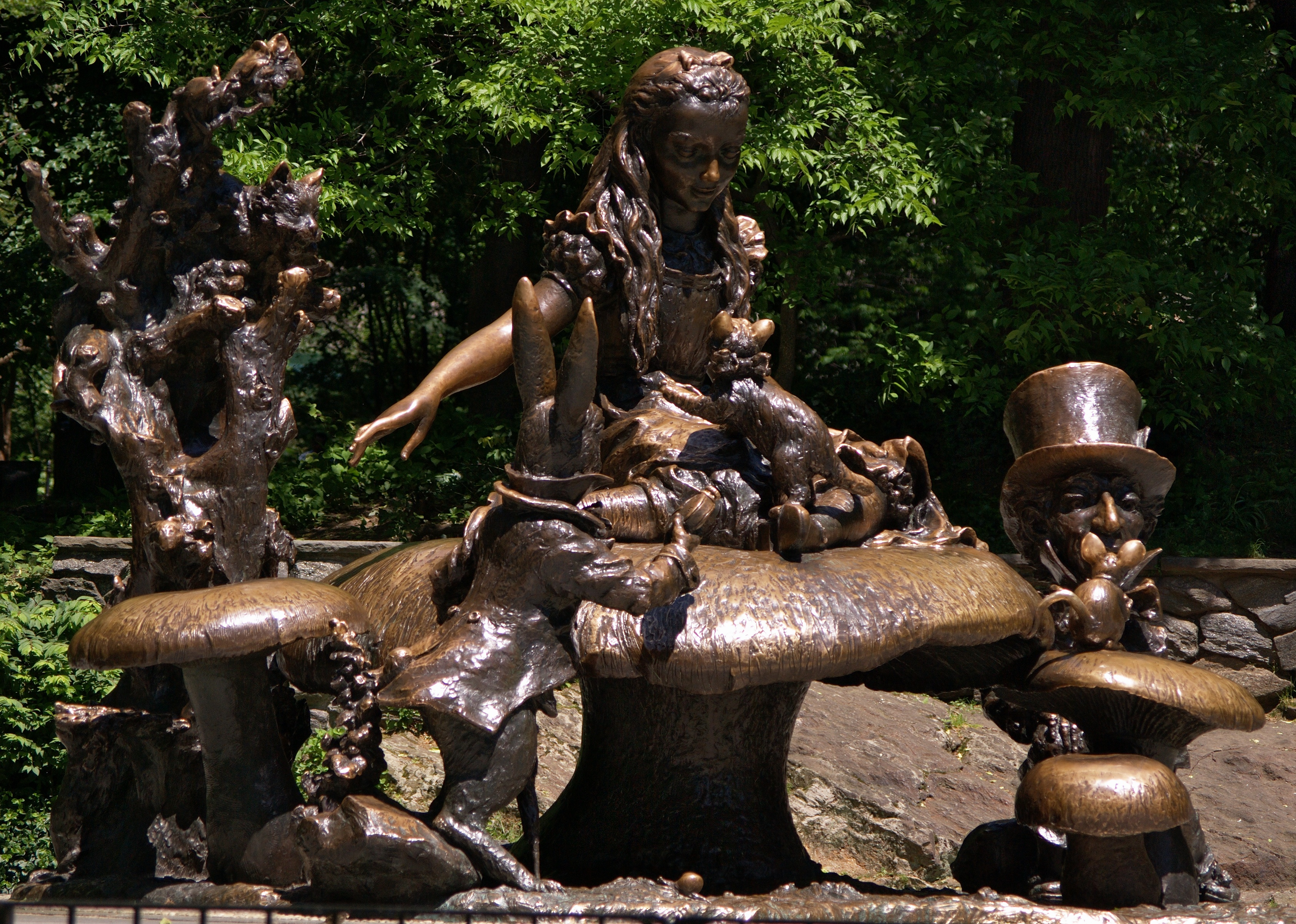

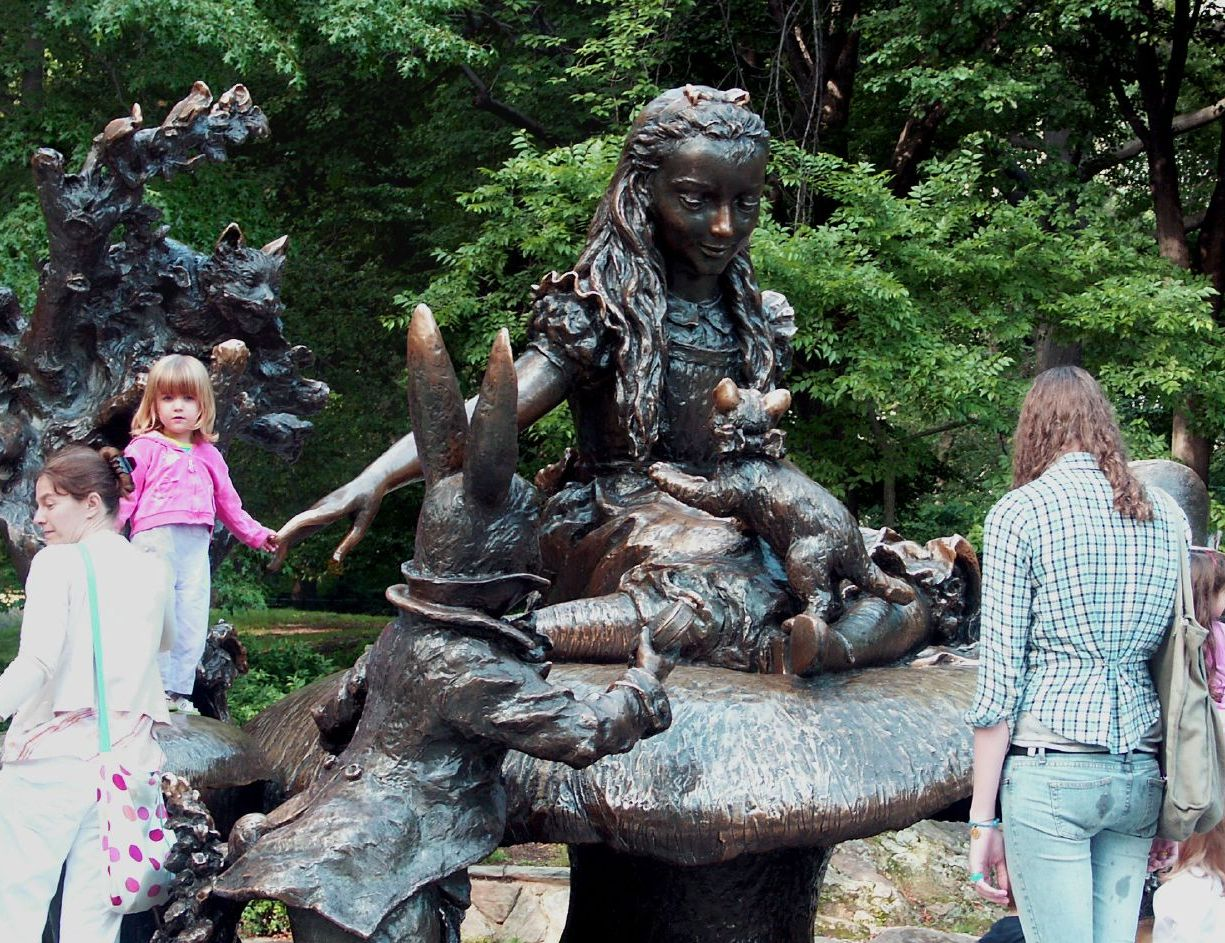

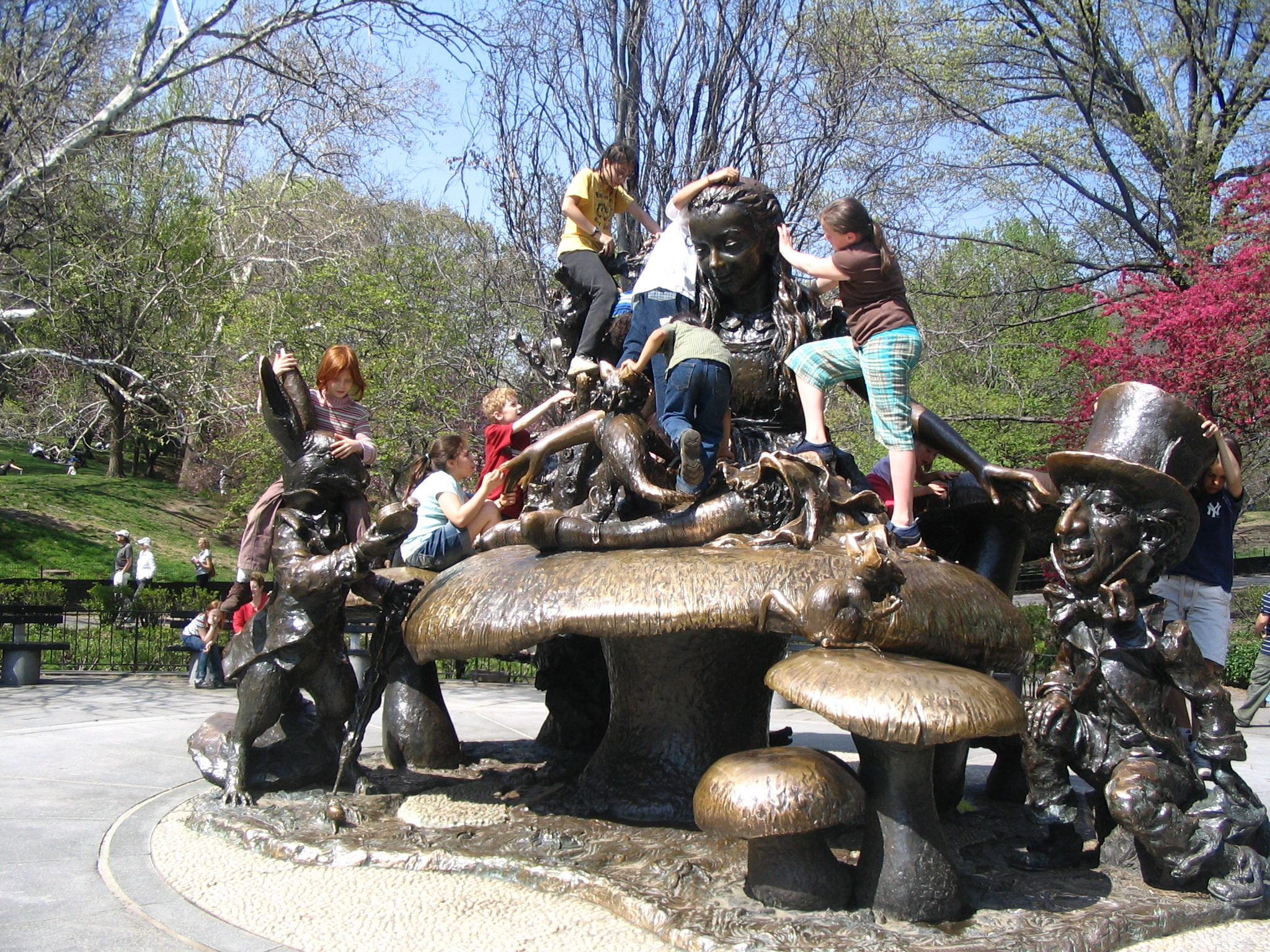

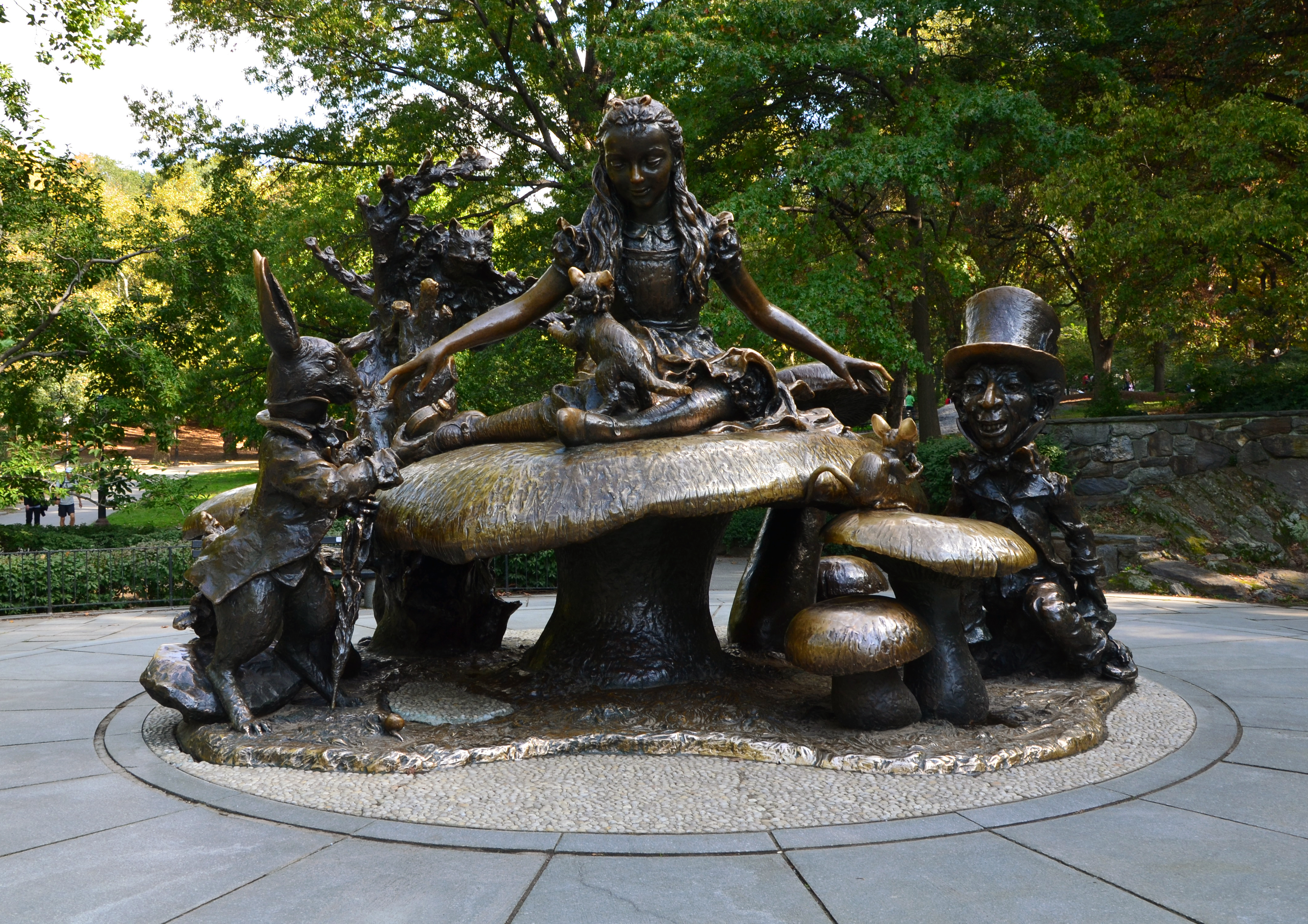

== See also ==
- Mushrooms in art
- Central Park Boathouse
- Works based on Alice in Wonderland
