= Alice Robertson Carr de Creeft =

American sculptor

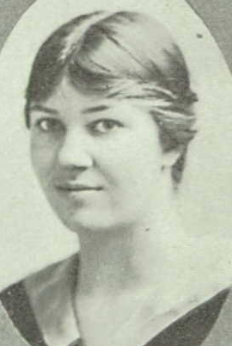
- Alice Robertson Carr (later de Creeft), from the 1919 yearbook of Lincoln High School in Seattle
- Born: Alice Robertson Carr; October 3, 1899; Roanoke, Virginia, United States
- Died: August 2, 1996 (aged 96); Cedar Falls, Iowa, United States
- Occupations: Sculptor, artist
- Spouse: Jose de Creeft
- Children: 2, including Nina de Creeft Ward

Alice Robertson Carr de Creeft (October 3, 1899 – August 2, 1996) was an American sculptor. In 1922, she became the first woman artist commissioned to create a public sculpture for Seattle, Washington.

== Early life and education ==
Alice Robertson Carr was born in Roanoke, Virginia, the daughter of William Watts Carr and Margaret MacDougall Carr. She had a twin brother, George Watson Carr, who became a geophysicist. She moved to the Sun River Valley in Montana with her family in 1909, and to Seattle soon after. She moved to New York after graduating from Lincoln High School in 1919, and became involved with the Art Students League. She studied drawing with George Bridgman and sculpture with Alexander Stirling Calder, with further studies under Albin Polasek in Chicago. Later in the 1920s, she went to Paris to study with Antoine Bourdelle, Stanley William Hayter, and Éduard Navellier.

== Career ==
In 1922, Carr became the first woman commissioned to create a public sculpture in Seattle, when she designed a fountain memorial for Francis Xavier Prefontaine in the city's Woodland Park. "The Fountain" included a 24-foot-long cast-concrete frieze, surrounding a semi-circular basin. She designed another panoramic memorial for the park in 1924, following the death of President Warren G. Harding. The Harding Memorial was dedicated in 1925. She spent several months in Hawaii after these back-to-back projects.

She began assisting sculptor José de Creeft in Spain in 1927. In 1930, she won a Crowninshield Award at the Stockbridge Art Exhibit in Massachusetts. After her divorce in 1939, she made sculptures, often in bronze with equestrian subjects, and taught art in Santa Barbara, California, for almost sixty years. She also designed floats for the Rose Parade in Pasadena. In 1983 she exhibited works alongside those of her daughter and granddaughter, at the Maryland Fine Arts Gallery in Monkton, Maryland.

== Personal life and legacy ==
Carr married José de Creeft in 1928, in London. They had two children, son William and daughter Nina de Creeft Ward, who became an artist herself. They divorced in 1939. She died in 1996, at the age of 96, in Cedar Falls, Iowa. Her memorials in Seattle's Woodland Park were removed during renovations in the 1970s; some of the bas-relief panels by Carr were destroyed, but some of the component statues were donated to the Chief Seattle Council of Boy Scouts.
