= Nina de Creeft Ward =

American artist and educator (born 1933)

- Born: Nina de Creeft; 1933 (age 92–93); New York City, US
- Education: Besant Hill School; Scripps College (BA); Claremont Graduate School (MA); Massachusetts College of Art
- Occupation: Artist
- Children: 5
- Parents: Jose de Creeft (father); Alice Robertson Carr de Creeft (mother)

Nina de Creeft Ward (born 1933) is an American artist who works with bronze, soft sculptures, etchings, woodcuts, and monoprints. She had multiple art exhibitions in the Philippines and the United States. Ward was the co-winner of the Individual Artists Award for Works in Clay in 2006 from the Santa Barbara Arts Fund. Most of Ward's work has to do with animals, including a 1998 exhibition of art that resembled endangered and extinct species. She has taught students such as at the University of Northern Iowa. Her clay animal models are made with raku ware.

== Personal life ==
Nina de Creeft Ward was born in 1933 in New York City to Jose de Creeft and Alice Robertson Carr de Creeft, who were both sculptors. Ward's mother cared for animals, leading to Ward having a fondness for them. Ward, her mother, and her brother moved to Santa Barbara, California, after her parents had a divorce. She spent her childhood in Santa Barbara and Ojai, California. Ward attended Happy Valley School, which is now known as Besant Hill School.

Ward began to sketch draft horses for the Los Angeles County Fair during her time at Scripps College. She received a Bachelor of Arts degree in 1956 from Scripps College, a Master of Fine Arts degree in 1964 from the Claremont Graduate School, and further studied at the Massachusetts College of Art. Ward was taught by Albert Stewart, Betty Davenport Ford, and Paul Soldner, with the last teaching her how to create raku ware. She later moved back to Santa Barbara in 2001 after living in Iowa for 26 years with her husband. They had five children.

== Career ==
Ward moved to Cedar Falls, Iowa, in 1975 and she taught art at the University of Northern Iowa for nine years. She was an art teacher for all ages from children to adults. She taught in Claremont at Girls Collegiate School for two to three years. Ward's work consists of bronze, soft sculptures, etchings, woodcuts, and monoprints. She made animals out of clay, and they are sold in the United States. Ward said that she works "almost exclusively with animal themes" with a "fairly sandy raku clay recipe" that she mixed herself.

The animals are individuals to me, and I try to stop once the personality is established and the basics are there. I like to leave some sense of how the piece was made, sometimes in a remnant of the texture of the canvas I roll the slab out on, sometimes in a little roughness in the modeling, sometimes in the harder line of the trimming. I like to leave in some of the scoring and drawing marks, and they may lead me to draw more with a sharp tool. I feel the piece should portray an animal in spirit and in form, but still be a clay animal.

— Ward

Ward built a sculpture of two draft horses titled Shoulders of Giants in 1998 for the University of Northern Iowa's library and museum. She created a bronze sculpture of a farm dog in 1999 named Shep at the Patty Jischke Children's Garden in Reiman Gardens. She first drew several pictures of her dog to create Shep, followed by small clay models. Once Ward finished the small models, she made a full-size clay model that was then made into a bronze cast in Kalona, Iowa. In 2016, Ward was the juror at the 2016 Tri-Cities Online Ceramics Show which was hosted by the Student Art Fund of the Santa Barbara Art Association. The Frick Collection's Archives Directory for the History of Collecting has "Esther Bear Gallery records, 1954-1977" that includes information about Ward.

=== Exhibitions ===
Ward's 1998 exhibition titled Rhino/Blaauwbock Project was made to show "how people have caused a scourge to the balance of nature" by using art that resembles corpses of extinct and endangered species. In response to the exhibition, Ward said, "I want to make a statement about anti-complacency. I think it's important to think about death. Something physical will put your mind on it whether you want to think about it or not. If you see something dead, you think about it." In 2012, Ward had an art exhibition in Los Olivos, California, at Young’s Gallery. She held an exhibition at the Beatrice Wood Center for the Arts in 2015 that included sculptures, prints, and drawings. In 2020, Ward displayed 28 of her animal sculptures at South Willard gallery in Los Angeles, California. A 2020 exhibition titled Santa Barbara Printmakers: Wild Places in Print at the Wildling Museum’s Barbara Goodall Education Center included Ward's art. A 2022 exhibition titled An Encomium: Women in Art included her work at the University of Northern Iowa Gallery of Art. Her exhibitions have been shown in the Philippines, California, Maryland, Iowa, Chicago, and Kansas City.

== Reception ==
David Pagel of the Los Angeles Times said that Ward's ceramic sculptures "are radical because they ask us to treat works of art as if they were pets: sensitive critters that repay our care and affection in ways that make us feel more connected to our best selves, not to mention other living things". Ward won the Individual Artists Award for Works in Clay in 2006, alongside Laura Langley, from the Santa Barbara Arts Fund.
