= Jose de Creeft =

Spanish born American sculptor

José de Creeft
- Born: November 27, 1884; Guadalajara, Spain
- Died: September 11, 1982 (aged 97); New York City, New York, U.S.
- Resting place: Hoosick Falls, New York, U.S.
- Occupations: Sculptor; artist; teacher
- Notable work: Alice in Wonderland sculpture (Central Park, NYC); The Cloud (Whitney Museum); Emerveillement (Metropolitan Museum of Art); Continuite (Smithsonian American Art Museum).
- Movement: Modernism
- Spouse: Alice Robertson Carr de Creeft (m. 1928, div. 1938)
- Children: 2, including Nina
- Awards: Crowninsheild Prize for Sculpture; Gold Medal, Pennsylvania Academy of the Fine Arts; Richard Prize, National Sculpture Society - Fellow, National Sculpture Society; Associate, National Academy of Design; President, Federation of Modern Painters and Sculptors

Signature
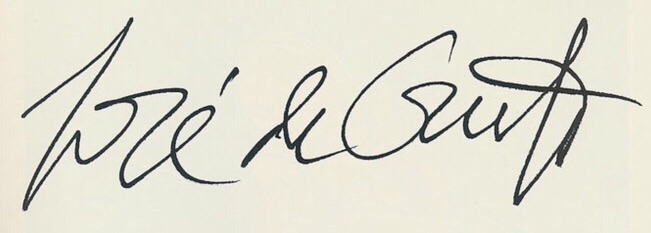

José Mariano de Creeft (November 27, 1884 – September 11, 1982) was a Spanish-born American artist, sculptor, and teacher known for modern sculpture in stone, metal, and wood, particularly figural works of women. His 16-foot (4.9 m) bronze Alice in Wonderland sculpture climbing sculpture in Central Park is well known to both adults and children in New York City. He was an early adopter, and prominent exponent of the direct carving approach to sculpture. He also developed the technique of lead chasing, and was among the first to create modern sculpture from found objects. He taught at Black Mountain College, the Art Students League of New York, and the New School for Social Research. His works are in the Whitney Museum, the Metropolitan Museum of Art, the Museum of Modern Art, the Smithsonian American Art Museum, and many other public and private collections.

== Early life ==
José de Creeft was born in Guadalajara, Spain, on November 27, 1884, to Catalan parents Mariano de Creeft y Masdeu and Rosa Champane y Ortiz. Four years later the family moved to Barcelona. In 1890, when his father died leaving the family destitute, de Creeft, his mother and two sisters moved in with an aunt. At six years of age, de Creeft took his first job earning pennies by carrying stone and sand at the construction site of La Sagrada Familia, designed and built by the architect Antonio Gaudi.

In 1895, de Creeft began modeling religious figures in clay to sell at the Festival Santa Lucia, Barcelona, which he fired at home in his kiln and sold near the steps of the Cathedral of Barcelona. Two years later he began his first apprenticeship with the craftsman and imagier, Barnadas who carved religious figures in wood. A year later, he was apprenticed at the Artistic Foundry of Masriera & Campins, under the sculptor Mariano Benlliure, followed by studies with Manolo Hugué.

In 1900, de Creeft moved to Madrid and studied in the workshop of Don Augustin Querol Subirats, Official Sculptor of Spain. This was de Creeft's first experience with stone carving. He also studied drawing with Rafael Hidalgo and Gutierrez de Caviedes, and sculpture with Ignacio Zuloaga. The following year he worked as a draftsman for the Madrid Administration of Bridges and Roads, where he learned perspective and precision drawing. In 1902, he opened his first studio with a friend on "Calle Españoletto". At this time he observed the art work of a group of Eskimos (Inuit) in El Retiro Park which had a profound impact on his developing aesthetic. “The Eskimos impressed me with their simplicity and their directness of expression. With tiny pieces of ivory they made monumental sculptures that had strength, power and serenity, though they were less than hand-sized.” A year later, his first exhibition of portraits of children in clay and plaster was held at El Circulo de Bellas Artes in Madrid.

In 1905, he moved to Paris. Upon the recommendation of Ignacio Zuloaga, and with the concurrence of Rodin, he entered the Académie Julian where he studied for two years. He opened his first studio at 14 rue Chamberry before establishing a second studio at the Bateau Lavoir in Montmartre, where he interacted with Pablo Picasso, Juan Gris, Manolo, and Pablo Gargallo, who also had studios there. During this period, de Creeft befriended the artist Mateo Hernandez.

De Creeft was awarded the Grand Prix in the 1906 Concours de Sculpture exhibition at the Académie Julian for his piece in clay, "Torso," which was the first recognition he had ever received for his work.

After a time in Spain, he returned to Paris in 1909, where he exhibited for the first time at the Salon de la Société des Artistes Français, showing a bronze head of a man and a plaster bust of a child. From 1909 to 1928 he exhibited periodically at the Société des Artistes Français, Société d’Encouragement Aux Artes, Société Nationale des Beaux-Arts, Salon d’Automne, Salon des Artes, Salon des Tuileries, Salon des Artes Indépendants, Exposición de Bellas Artes, Salon des Humoristes, and the Exposición de Artes Decorativas y Industriales Modernas.

From 1911 to 1914 he was employed at the workshop of La Maison Greber, learning traditional techniques of reproducing sculpture in stone with pointing machines known as "mise aux point". In 1915, he eschewed the purely classical methods of sculpture which consisted of copying from plaster models and enlarging with a pointing machine. He began using the technique of "taille directe", or direct carving. He referred to this method of carving as “pure sculpture.” Inspired by modernism, de Creeft destroyed all his previous casts, molds, and clay pieces. When he had destroyed all but two pieces, his friend Julio de Diego came to visit him. They took the remaining two sculptures outside to the traffic circle surrounding the Arc de Triomphe and placed bets on which car would hit which sculpture.

De Creeft completed Barbare, his first direct sculpture in wood in 1915. The next year he produced a red granite head, his first in stone, and displayed it at the Société Nationale des Beaux-Arts. He also completed his first portrait carved directly from life, Enigma, in Black Belgium Marble. The following year he taught his first group of private students from Mexico and South America.

At the conclusion of World War I, there was a demand for artistic tributes to the heroes of the war, and in 1918, he was awarded a commission to carve a seven-foot granite war memorial of a French Infantryman. This sculpture, Le Poilu in Saugues (Puy-de-Dome), stands on a ten-foot base in the town square. He completed this work in 1921, and as a result was elected Officier de I’Instruction Publique, Paris. This led to his execution of twenty-one drawings for Twenty-one Meditations, a book by Albert Rid.

In 1924, de Creeft developed the process of chased lead, the first of several original techniques he employed. After casting the large, rough forms, he hammered, carved and incised the lead with typical chasing tools used in foundries for finishing work. Examples of sculptures made with this technique included Portrait of César Vallejo and Orchidia. Both works, made in 1924, featured solid forms with open spaces. At that time no other artists attempted to use this technique.

In 1925, de Creeft developed another new technique, now known as found object, or assemblage art, when he was asked to create a piece for the Gran Bal Español by the world-famous flamenco dancer Vicente Escudero. At the time, de Creeft was bedridden with fever and flu. Upon being told the piece must be ready in days, de Creeft dismantled his stove to create Le Picador, an eight-foot figure on horseback. Adding used tire tubes to depict the horse's intestines protruding from its belly, de Creeft paraded his piece through the streets of Paris to great acclaim and the event received worldwide press coverage.

It was the first time an artist turned scrap metal into sculpture. The inspiration for this piece came from his youth, when de Creeft witnessed the mistreatment of horses. A relative took him behind the scenes at the bullfight arena where he saw people putting the intestines back in the horses, sewing them up with straw and sending them back to the bullfight. Le Picador was displayed at the Société des Artistes Indépendants the following year. It was at that time he met Alexander Calder, who became his student in direct carving. Upon seeing Calder's mechanical toys, de Creeft encouraged him to display them. Calder put his Circus together for the first time in de Creeft's studio where he showed it to other artists. Later, Calder and de Creeft became lifelong friends after de Creeft and his family moved to the United States.

In 1927, de Creeft moved to Mallorca, Spain, when he was commissioned by the painter, Roberto Ramonge to create sculptures for his fourteenth-century fortress, La Fortaleza. Granted complete artistic freedom, he undertook the work with such vigor and enthusiasm that in eighteen months he carved more than two hundred pieces in stone. While maintaining his residence in Mallorca he exhibited in Paris, and visited there periodically during the following year.

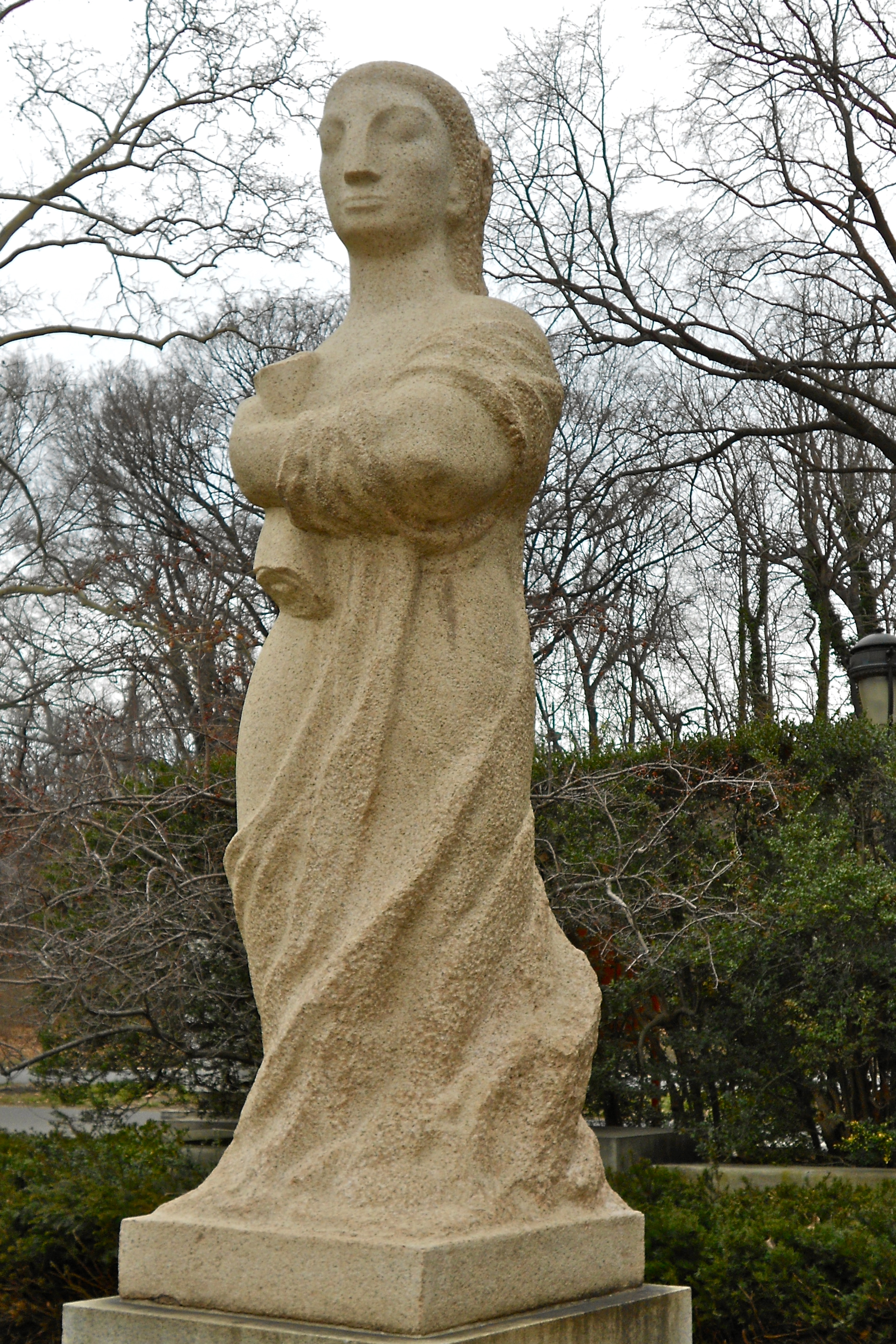
Poet, 1956

Continuite, 1958.

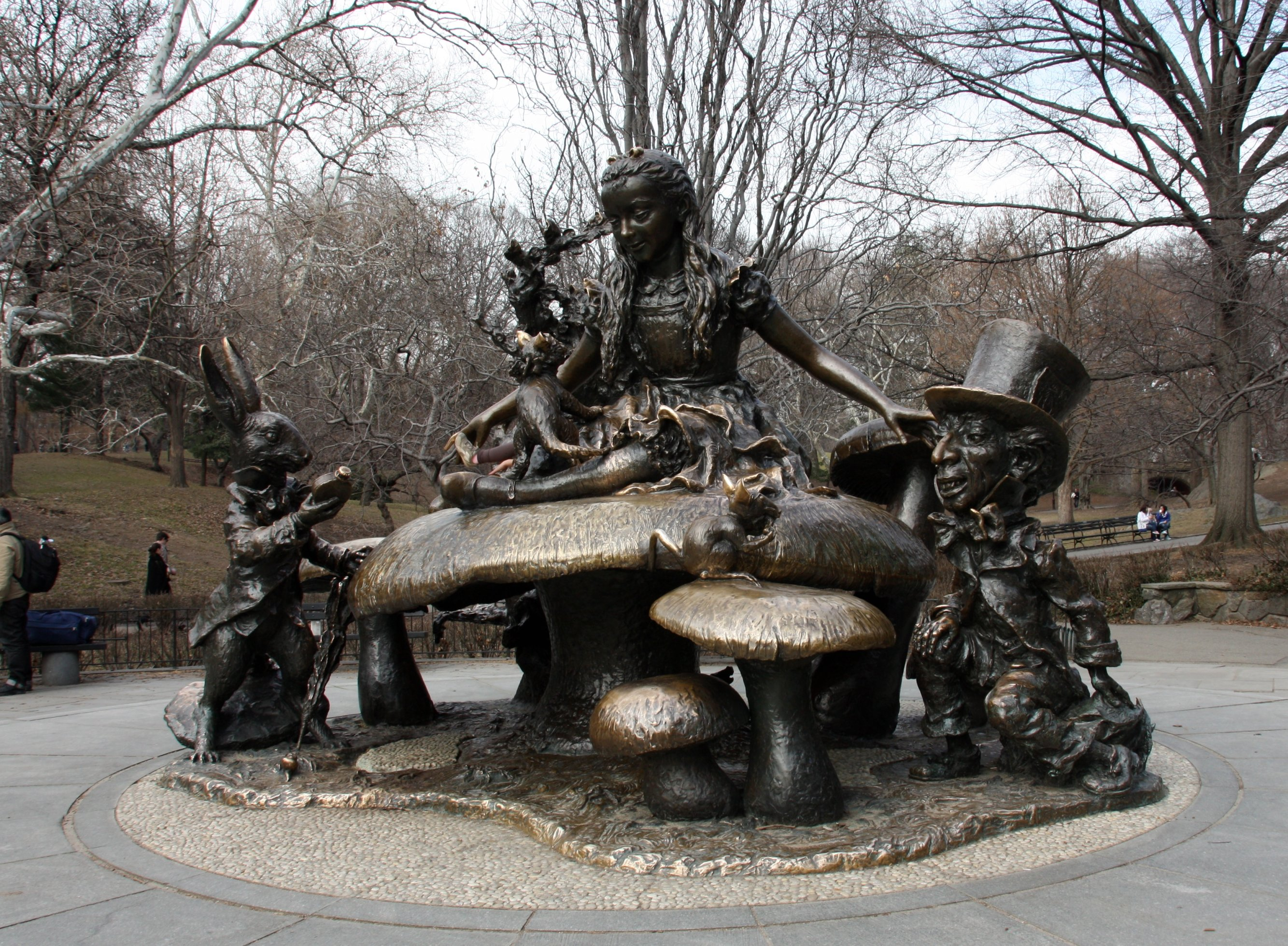
Alice in Wonderland sculpture in Central Park, 1959

== Emigration to the United States ==
In 1929, de Creeft married an American, Alice Robertson Carr, in London. She had been one of his private students in Paris. While in Paris, Alice Carr also studied etching with de Creeft's friend Stanley W. Hayter. Later, she became well known for her bronze portraits of show and race horses. Alice Carr and José de Creeft traveled to the United States in June, 1929. This was de Creeft's first trip to America, and the newly married couple stayed with Alice's father. In July, de Creeft held his first solo exhibition in the United States at The Art Institute of Seattle, Washington State.

The couple settled in New York City in September and de Creeft established a studio at 1 Washington Square. In December, he had his first solo exhibition at the Ferargil Galleries in New York City which was to be his home for the next 54 years. Among the sculptures were The Portrait of Cesar Vallejo in chased lead, and The Silver Fox made of found materials. His second exhibit at the Ferargil Galleries in September, coincided with the stock market crash and as an unfortunate consequence, no sales resulted from the exhibition.

In 1930, he took a studio at 22 Minetta Lane, and a residence at 1 Washington Place, in Greenwich Village. While in New York, he continued to innovate and developed a technique known as "Beaten Lead" which involved the creation of three-dimensional sculptures from one-quarter inch thick sheets of lead. His process involved suspending a lead sheet from the ceiling with clamps, and using ball peen hammers to work both sides of the sheet simultaneously. During this year he also created his first beaten lead portrait from life, Portrait of Jolas, and had solo exhibitions at the Arts Club of Chicago, and the 56th Street Gallery in New York City.

1931, he traveled to Paris, and later returned to Mallorca, where he completed a life-size portrait bust of Gertrude Lawrence in beaten lead (collection of The Museum of the City of New York) that was exhibited at the opening of Lawrence's play, Can a Leopard?

Throughout the 1930s, the family spent periods of time in France and Spain. Their son, William, was born in Paris in 1932. In the summer of 1932, de Creeft took a group of American students to Mallorca, where he had a solo exhibition at the Galleria Costa Palma. In 1932, de Creeft was also offered a position teaching sculpture at The New School for Social Research in New York, which he accepted. His first comprehensive exhibition was held at The New School that year. Alice gave birth to their daughter, Nina de Creeft Ward, in 1933.

In 1936, while the de Creefts were living in Mallorca, the Spanish Civil War erupted in Pollensa. The Fortaleza was bombed, damaging many of de Creeft's sculptures. The family was separated. He was forced to flee, while Alice Carr de Creeft and their two children were evacuated separately on an American ship. Upon his return to America, de Creeft established himself in New York City, and that year became a founding member of the American Artists' Congress. He joined the Georgette Passedoit Gallery in New York City, where his first show included sculpture and watercolors of Mallorca and Connecticut. From 1936 to 1948, de Creeft had eleven solo exhibitions at the Passedoit Gallery. In 1936, he took a group of students to Paris for instruction during the summer.

Santa Barbara, California became his home for three months during 1937 while he visited his wife and children. During that stay trip he exhibited watercolors and sculpture at the Faulkner Memorial Art Gallery, Santa Barbara, California.

In 1938 he became a founding member of the Sculptors Guild, an exhibiting group based in New York City.

He and Alice Carr de Creeft divorced in February 1939, and he relocated his studio to 218 Greene Street, New York. Eva Campos, one of de Creeft's private students, introduced her husband, Jules, to de Creeft. Jules Campos taught de Creeft fencing, which they enjoyed together, and they became close friends. In 1940, at Campos’ urging, de Creeft became a U.S. citizen. In 1945, Jules Campos wrote the book, The Sculpture of Jose de Creeft (© 1945, 1972 Jules Campos, Kennedy Graphics, Da Capo Press Inc. NYC 1972). As war came to Spain and then the rest of Europe in the 1930s, many artists emigrated to the United States, and de Creeft was reconnected with a number of his artist friends from Spain, including Esteban Vicente, Luis Quintanilla Isasi, Salvador Dalí.

In 1940, de Creeft resigned from the Artist's Congress due to its unquestioning support of the Soviet Union, and he formed the alternative Federation of Modern Painters and Sculptors.

In 1940 and 1941, de Creeft was a resident at the Yaddo Art colony in Saratoga Springs, New York. While there he became friends with Eudora Welty, who wrote an article about de Creeft in 1944, in the Magazine of Art.

In 1944, de Creeft taught in the notable summer program at Black Mountain College, North Carolina. During that term, he met his future wife, Lorrie Goulet, of Los Angeles, CA. who was studying there. They were married the following November in a ceremony performed by Society of Ethical Culture. While at Black Mountain College, de Creeft met the director and artist Joseph Albers, his wife Annie and the architect Walter Gropius (all formerly of the Bauhaus school) as well as the Spanish architect Josep Lluis Sert and the French artists Jean Charlot and Amédée Ozenfant. That same year he began teaching at The Art Students' League, was elected to Board of Directors of the Society of Independent Artists and had a solo exhibition at the College of William and Mary, Williamsburg, Virginia.

In 1946, de Creeft and Goulet purchased a hundred-acre farm in Hoosick Falls, NY where they established a studio and part-time residence. During the summers, de Creeft was assisted by a steady stream of students including Gary Lawrence Sussman who stayed with him over the course of six and a half years and became a valued family friend. Working outdoors improved de Creeft's health and relieved the pulmonary difficulties he had developed from carving stone. In addition to the unique renovations and repairs he enjoyed making on his house, de Creeft was also an avid woodsman, cutting, splitting and stacking all of the wood used for heating and cooking. It was there that he created the second portrait of his wife, Lorrie, carved directly from life in English Caen stone. Their daughter, Donna Maria, was born in New York City in 1948. De Creeft became a founding member of the Artists Equity Association. In 1956 he joined the Contemporary Galleries, New York City, where he had solo exhibitions biannually until 1966, and in 1970 he joined the Kennedy Galleries, New York City, where he had solo exhibitions in ’72, ’73, ’74, and ’79.

== Commissions ==
1951 marked the beginning of a five years work on Poetess, an eight-foot granite figure, for the Ellen Phillips Samuel Memorial, Fairmount Park, Philadelphia. Working upstate during the summers, de Creeft utilized his forging skills to sharpen and re-temper over two hundred points (tools) daily in the forge he built at his farm.

He was awarded a commission in 1957 for a hammered-copper sculpture, Theme, for the Jewish Community Center, in White Plains, New York.

He was commissioned to do the bronze Alice in Wonderland sculpture group by George T. Delacorte Jr. as a memorial for his wife, Margarita in 1956. The 12’ x 16’ bronze work, near East 74th Street in Central Park, was dedicated by Parks Commissioner Robert Moses during a gala public event in 1959. The sculpture was intended to be climbed on by children. De Creeft's daughter, Donna Maria was the model for the face of Alice. Alice sits on a large mushroom at a tea party held by the Mad Hatter (whose face is supposedly modeled on that of George Delacorte) with the March Hare, the White Rabbit, the Dormouse, the Cheshire Cat, the Caterpillar, and Alice's kitten Dinah in her lap. It was patterned on illustrations drawn by John Tenniel. It is favored by children who enjoy climbing on it, which was contemplated in its design. At the base of the statue, among other inscriptions, is a line from Lewis Carroll's nonsense poem "Jabberwocky". In 1995, the short film, The Making of Jose de Creeft’s Alice In Wonderland Sculpture Garden – Narrated By Lorrie Goulet was produced and directed by J. D’Alba. Due to the amount of usage the piece received, the mold it was cast from was eventually stored by the Parks Department for future replacements. The monument, one of de Creeft's major works, gave him worldwide recognition.

The City of New York awarded a commission to de Creeft in 1961 for a mosaic mural at the Bronx Municipal Hospital Center, Nurses Residence and School, Bronx, New York which was completed in 1962.

De Creeft was also commissioned by the City of New York to create a bronze relief Medical Science – The Gift of Health, for the Public Health Laboratory of Bellevue Hospital in 1966.

== Later life ==
The Whitney Museum held the first major retrospective of de Creeft's work In May 1960, organized by the American Federation of Arts. The exhibition traveled for the next two years to thirteen museums throughout the United States. That summer, de Creeft and his family spent three months driving through France, Italy and Spain, visiting the places where he had worked and lived, including the Fortaleza in Mallorca to survey the damages to his outdoor works that were inflicted during the Spanish Civil War. During the trip they had the occasion to visit his friend Salvador Dalí at his house in Cadaqués.

In 1965, de Creeft exhibited at The White House in the Festival of the Arts, where he and Goulet attended the opening dinner in the Rose Garden hosted by Lady Bird Johnson.

Robert Hanson produced a documentary film in 1966, showing de Creeft sculpting The Hand of Creation, from white Carrara marble (Collection of the Art Students League of New York). This is the only filmed record of de Creeft carving directly. In the film he states: "I love the stones. I respect the stones like my grandfather.” De Creeft and Goulet also purchased a four-story building on West 20th Street, New York City where they established a permanent residence and studio.

De Creeft became one of three American artists chosen to be represented in The Vatican Permanent Collection of Religious Art, Rome, Italy, when the museum purchased his work, The Baby’s Sleep in 1972. He was awarded the "Comendador" of the Order of Isabella the Catholic, Madrid, Spain in 1973. The following year a special exhibition of de Creeft's works from the collection of the Hirshhorn Museum, Washington, DC, was held in honor of his 90th birthday, including a display of his tools. A major retrospective exhibition of his work was held at the New School for Social Research, New York City.

In 1976 he was honored by the Spanish Consulate in New York City, Alberto López Herce, who arranged an audience with King Juan Carlos I of Spain for de Creeft and Goulet on the occasion of the King's first visit to the United States. In 1977 de Creeft was named Hijo Predilicto (Honored Son) of Guadalajara, Spain. A street was named in his honor; and a plaque was placed on the house of his birth. He was awarded the keys to the city, but was unable to attend the ceremony. His wife, Lorrie Goulet gave the acceptance speech on his behalf.

In 1981, La Aventura humana de José de Creeft, a major retrospective at the Fundació Joan Miró in Barcelona. was organized by Carles Fontseré. Though de Creeft was unable to attend, he was represented by his wife, Lorrie Goulet. The exhibition was well received by the Spanish press and traveled to seven museums throughout Spain for two years. De Creeft donated Le Picador, his 1925 metal assemblage, to the Fundació Joan Miró in honor of his father.

In 1976, the town of Hoosick Falls, New York, passed a resolution for a memorial honoring de Creeft to be placed in Wood Park. De Creeft donated his granite sculpture The Guardian, and he designed the marble seating and pedestal on which it was placed. The citizens of the town raised the funds for this project. The Guardian, 1918, was produced as a demonstration for the French government showing his ability to carve granite for the commission of Le Poilu.

== Death ==
On September 11, 1982, José de Creeft died at the age of 97 in his home in Manhattan, New York City. His ashes were buried in Hoosick Falls, New York, at the foot of "The Guardian" in a granite urn carved by a group of his students, with the help of his son-in-law, Charles Perkins.

The monument reads: Jose de Creeft November 27, 1884 - September 11, 1982 “Love and Respect One Another”

In addition to memorials held in the Great Hall at Cooper Union and the Art Students' League, a major retrospective honoring the life and art of de Creeft, was held the following year at the Smithsonian American Art Museum, Washington, DC

“The Figure in American Sculpture – A Question of Modernity” was an exhibition organized by the Museum of Contemporary Art, Los Angeles, and de Creeft's work The Cloud, was chosen for the cover of the catalog (University of Washington Press, 1995).

Two Solo Exhibitions of de Creeft's work were held in 1997, an exhibition of drawings, at the MB Modern Gallery, and Sculpture and Drawings at The Child's Gallery, both in New York City.

== Recognition ==
- 1906 - awarded the Grand Prix in the Concours de Sculpture for his piece in clay, Torso, at the Académie Julian.
- 1933 - awarded the Crowninshield Prize for sculpture at the Twenty-fifth Annual (Massachusetts) Art Exhibition. José de Creeft is elected to the Board of Directors for the New York Society of Independent Artists, and he installs the sculpture section of the Nineteenth Exhibition of Society of Independent Artists at Grand Central Palace, New York City
- 1940 and 1941- wins a fellowship to spend the summer at Yaddo Art colony, Saratoga Springs, New York
- 1941- elected President of the Federation of Modern Painters and Sculptors
- 1942 - at the "Artists For Victory" exhibition at The Metropolitan Museum of Art, he is awarded first prize and the purchase prize of $5,000.00 for Maternity. Art News selects Maternity as the best sculpture of the year. His show at the Passedoit Gallery is selected as one of the ten outstanding exhibitions of the year.
- 1945 - Gold Medal Recipient for Rachmaninoff, Beaten Lead, at the 140th annual of The Pennsylvania Academy of the Fine Arts, Philadelphia, Pennsylvania. Is “Critics Choice” at the Seventeenth Regiment Armory Show, New York, New York
- 1946 - elected to the National Sculpture Society.
- 1948 - elected Associate of National Academy of Design.
- 1951 - Les Adieux (The Farewell), beaten lead, is awarded top prize of $10,000 in the American Sculpture competition at the Metropolitan Museum of Art, New York City
- 1952 - becomes a member of Board of Directors of Audubon Artists.
- 1954 - Gold Medal for Young Woman, marble, at the twelfth annual exhibition of Audubon Artists.
- 1956 - Acrobats, stone, wins Medal of Honor at the Audubon Artists.
- 1958 - elected Fellow of the National Sculpture Society
- 1961 - elected first Vice-President, New York Chapter of the Artists Equity Association
- 1969 - awarded the Therese and Edwin H. Richard Prize for Dream, pink Tennessee marble, by the National Sculpture Society. Elected to Chair at the American Academy of Arts and Letters, New York City.
- 1975 - Columbia University in New York City awards de Creeft the Florence Eickemeyer Award for Excellence on recommendation of the National Academy Museum and School
- 1980 - receives a Merit Award from Artists Equity Association.

== Exhibitions ==
- 1903 - first exhibition at El Círculo de Bellas Artes in Madrid
- 1929 - first solo exhibition in the United States at the Seattle Art Museum, Washington
- 1929 - December solo exhibition at the Ferargil Galleries in New York.
- 1932 - joint exhibition with etcher, Alphonse Legros, at the Philadelphia Art Alliance, Philadelphia, Pennsylvania.
- 1943 - solo exhibition at the St. Paul Gallery, Minnesota.
- 1961 - exhibition of drawings at the Louis Alexander Gallery, New York City
- 1989 - solo exhibition of de Creeft's Sculpture and Drawings 1917–1940, at the Child's Gallery, New York City, and José de Creeft (1884-1982), a survey of drawings, is held at Louis Newman Galleries, Beverly Hills, California
- 1992 - Snyder Fine Arts Gallery, New York City hosts a solo exhibition of his watercolors.

== Teaching ==
- In 1944, de Creeft teaches during summer term at Black Mountain College, North Carolina
- From 1944 to 1948, teaches at The Art Students League of New York City
- From 1949 to 1950 he is a visiting Instructor at Skowhegan School of Painting and Sculpture, Maine, during the summer, and in the winter he is visiting instructor at the Norton Gallery and School of Fine Arts, West Palm Beach, Florida.
- From 1957 to 1960 de Creeft is on the faculty of The New School For Social Research, New York City
- From 1957- 81 he teaches at The Art Students League, New York City

== Collections ==
- 1938: The Brooklyn Museum, New York purchases Semitic Head, beaten lead; and Woman in The Sun, white marble, is purchased by Billy Rose for the Art Garden at the Israel Museum, Jerusalem.
- 1939: Maya, black Belgium marble, is purchased by Wichita University.
- 1940: Museum of Modern Art purchases Saturnia, beaten lead.
- 1941: Whitney Museum of American Art purchases The Cloud, limestone; the Metropolitan Museum of Art purchased Emerveillement, serpentine marble
- 1943: Whitney Museum, New York, NY, purchases Himalaya, beaten lead
- 1945: Atlantis, green serpentine marble is purchased by the University of Pennsylvania.
- 1951: Rachmaninoff, beaten lead, is purchased by the Pennsylvania Academy
- 1967: New Being, marble, is purchased by The Wichita State University, Wichita, Kansas
- 1976: Nude, walnut, is acquired by the Smithsonian Museum of American Art.
- 1983: Marguerite, bronze on stone base, is acquired by Smithsonian American Art Museum, Luce Foundation Center as a Gift of Lorrie Goulet De Creeft and "Head of Gertrude Stein," ceramic and shell, 1931, was purchased by the Smithsonian American Art Museum, Luce Foundation.
- 1986: Continuite, marble, is acquired by the Smithsonian American Art Museum, as a gift of the Sara Ruby Foundation.
- Southern Alleghenies Museum of Art

== Publications ==
- Campos, Jules. José de Creeft. Erich S. Herrmann, NY, 1945
- Cunningham, John J. José de Creeft. University of Georgia Press/National Sculpture Society, Athens, Georgia, 1950.
- Campos, Jules. The Sculpture of José de Creeft. Kennedy Graphics, Inc., NY, 1972

== See also ==
- List of American artists
