= Norman Chaffer =

Australian ornithologist, photographer and businessman (1899–1992)

Norman Chaffer OAM, FRZS, RAOU (15 March 1899 – 22 November 1992) was an Australian businessman, a bird photographer and an amateur ornithologist. He was a pioneer of nature photography, conservation education, and colour cinematography.

== Early life and training ==
Chaffer was born in Willoughby, Sydney, on 15 March 1899 to Walter Chaffer and Hannah (née Bibby) and the family lived at Valley View in Victoria Avenue. In 1912 he qualified in the secondary entry examination at Chatswood Public School, and in 1917 passed the Technical Education exam, achieving good grades in algebra, geometry, mathematics, and trigonometry before his final year, 1920. In November 1928 he became lifelong director of a leather manufacturer which his father started in 1887. At its registration as a company in 1928 W. Chaffer & Sons Pty Ltd. held a capital of £20,000 (a 2025 value of A$1.6M) in £1 shares.

== Ornithologist ==
In 1918, at age nineteen, Chaffer was a member of the Royal Zoological Society of New South Wales, for which he was appointed Honorary Ranger, under the Birds and Animals Protection Act of that year, by Chief Secretary Charles Oakes.

== Photographer ==
In 1924, as the youngest member of the Royal Australasian Ornithologists Union, his display of lanten slide photogrpahs garnered the praise of his colleagues as "the best work of the kind done in Australia by anyone so young." The following year, the Union made a presentation to Chaffer "to honour of his marriage" to Pearl.

In the 1930s, and living in Chatswood and driving an American Nash Tourer that was affordable by few during the Depression, Chaffer began a series of lectures, screenings, and presentations. These he continued into the 1950s, at venues including Sydney's Lyceum Club; the Education Department's art gallery, for Bird Week; Emerson Hall; The Royal Zoological Society's auditorium in Science House; Adyar Hall; Federation House (as a fundraiser for the postwar Food for Britain Appeal), Illawarra Natural History Society, among others.

Chaffer was a frequent contributor of his bird photography to newspapers, magazines and journals as diverse as National Geographic, the Gould League Annual, Emu, The Australasian, The School Magazine, as well as, into the late 1970s, The Australian Women's Weekly.

== Filmmaker ==
The series of films that Chaffer produced (in colour by 1944) were greeted by Chisholm as "a good deal more instructive than anything that comes out of Hollywood." His 1936 film of the white-bellied sea eagle was distributed by Cinesound. The recently appointed Governor-General, the Duke, and Duchess, of Goucester were given a special viewing of Chaffer's films at Admiralty House in August 1945, before the same colour documentaries were shown in Melbourne's State Library in October for the RAOU annual congress. His, by then "famous", technicolour films of bowerbirds, crested terns, silver gulls and fairy penguins, and Australian widlflowers, continued to be shown through the late 1940s. Starting in 1950 Chaffer turned to sound recording to augment his documentation of native birds, employing a wire recorder, cumbersome but capable of good fidelity, that was a forerunner to the tape recorder that was soon to replace it. He presented his recordings, with photographs, to Sydney Teachers' College students in 1954.

== Bowerbirds ==
Chaffer discovered in the mid-1930s that male bowerbirds 'paint' the sticks of their bower with "pulp from berries, charcoal, or even blue from a laundry blue bag", "mixed with the bird's saliva," and applied with a brush or wad made "from a bundle of fibrous bark about two inches long. Selecting a piece from this bundle, the bird drew it into its bill with a sort of nibbling action until it formed a wad about a quarter of an inch across, and with this proceeded to paint the bower." For the Australasian Photo-Review he produced an article with practical advice on how to successfully photograph these elusive birds. Chaffer's photograph of the timid golden bowerbird of North Queensland, taken on a 1954 expedition in remote parts of the Atherton Tableland with his son Barrie and fellow members of the R.A.O.U. Jack Waterhouse and Bill Moore, was reported to be its "first ever taken." His In Quest of Bowerbirds, illustrated with his photographs, was published by Rigby in 1984.

== Reception ==
In 1954 Chaffer was described as "one of the most prominent bird photographers in Australia." McGregor (2022) rates him an 'accomplished' photographer who contributed many of the illustrations in early photographic field guides; Keith Hindwood and Arnold McGill’s 1958 The Birds of Sydney, and Graeme Chapman’s Common Australian Birds of Towns and Gardens (1970).

Alec Chisholm, also a member of RAOU cited Chaffer's bird observations and imagery in his column "Ways of the Wild" in Sydney's Daily Telegraph; as did James Devaney in Queensland's Daily Mercury and Townsville Daily Bulletin; Charles Fenner, writing as 'Tellurian' in The Australasian;, Michael Sharland in his 'Naturalist's Notebook' for the Sydney Morning Herald; and Estelle Thomson in articles on 'Bird Craftsmanship' in the Brisbane Telegraph.

Gavin Souter in 1967, writing on the work of British diplomat and photographer Donald Trounson in Australia whose method was to capture birds to be photographed live in a perspex box, compared his approach with that of:

Purists like Ellis McNamara and Norman Chaffer [who] prefer photographing birds in their natural surroundings, usually in or near the nest. This requires great patience and ingenuity. The photographer may have to shoot from a hide, and he almost always uses flash to overcome poor lighting. Photographs of this kind can be exquisitely beautiful. But there are two disadvantages to the basic reliance on flash: the background appears unnaturally dark, and there may also be slight differences in colour values.

== Royal Australasian Ornithologists Union ==
As a member of the RAOU, Chaffer contributed to its journal Emu, and joined the Union's camps, on the Murrumbidgee near Leeton in 1939, and its congresses, and 1951 jubilee at the Hattah Lakes, after his recent visit to New Guinea. He lectured on that expedition and presented the films Isla de Oro, Birds of Paradise, Native Life, and Birds of the Swamp at the Illawarra Natural History Society in 1954.

== Death and legacy ==
Norman Chaffer, then living at 1 Roslyn Ave., Roseville, married to his second wife Marjorie, died on 23 November 1992. His nephew Edric, whose interest was in geology, while still at Knox Grammar School at seventeen was a member of a 1950 expedition accompanied by Charles P. Mountford, to Central Australia's spinifex country.

== Memberships and awards ==
- Amateur Cinematographers' Association
- Royal Australasian Ornithologists Union (RAOU) President 1954–1955, and Fellow of the RAOU, 1991
- Royal Zoological Society of New South Wales
- 1979: Medal of the Order of Australia, "for service to conservation"

== Publications ==
- Sharland, S.R.; Chaffer, Norman; Hindwood, R.A.; Leathead, David; Chisholm, Alec H.; Gilbert, P. A.; Cayley, Neville W. (1935). Cayley, F.R.Z.S., Neville W. (ed.). Feathered Friends, a Gould League Annual. Sydney: Angus & Robertson.
- Chaffer, Norman (1984). In quest of bowerbirds. Adelaide ; New York: Rigby. ISBN 978-0-7270-1942-4.

=== Contributions ===
- Frauca, Harry (1971). Australian bush birds. Melbourne: Lansdowne. ISBN 978-0-7018-0264-6.
