= Microcarbo serventyorum =

Microcarbo serventyorum Temporal range: Holocene

Scientific classification
- Kingdom: Animalia
- Phylum: Chordata
- Class: Aves
- Order: Suliformes
- Family: Phalacrocoracidae
- Genus: Microcarbo
- Species: †M. serventyorum

Binomial name
- †Microcarbo serventyorum van Tets, 1994

Extinct species of bird

Microcarbo serventyorum, also referred to as Serventy's cormorant, is an extinct species of small cormorant from the Holocene of Australia. It was described by Gerard Frederick van Tets from subfossil skeletal material (a pelvis with proximal parts of the femora and some caudal vertebrae) found in 1970 in a peat swamp at Bullsbrook, Western Australia. The pelvic features indicate that the bird was adept at foraging in confined wetlands such as swamps with dense vegetation, small pools and narrow streams. The specific epithet honours the brothers Dominic and Vincent Serventy for their contributions to knowledge of Australian cormorants.
