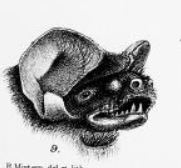

Scientific classification
- Kingdom: Animalia
- Phylum: Chordata
- Class: Mammalia
- Order: Chiroptera
- Family: Molossidae
- Genus: Austronomus; Troughton, 1944

= Austronomus =

Genus of bats

Austronomus, known as Australasian free-tailed bats, is a molossid genus of microchiropterans. The two recognised species are the white-striped Austronomus australis, found in a wide distribution range across Australia, and the New Guinea species Austronomus kuboriensis.

The genus name was first proposed by Tom Iredale and Ellis Troughton in 1934, but this lacked a formal description until Troughton included one in his Furred animals of Australia (1944). The type species of the genus is Molossus australis Gray, 1838.

Austronomus has previously been considered a synonym of Tadarida, a widespread genus of freetail bats. However, morphological evidence suggests that this broad concept of Tadarida is not monophyletic.
