= Wettenhall (surname) =

Wettenhall is a surname. Notable people with the surname include:

- Norman Wettenhall (1915–2000), Australian paediatrician, ornithologist and philanthropist
- Steve Wettenhall (born 1963), Australian politician

== See also ==
- Norman Wettenhall Foundation
- Edward Wetenhall
