= John Warham =

Australian ornithologist and photographer

John Warham MNZM (11 October 1919 – 12 May 2010) was an Australian and New Zealand photographer and ornithologist notable for his research on seabirds, especially petrels.

Warham was born in Halifax, Yorkshire, in England, and educated at King Edward VI Grammar School at Retford, Nottinghamshire. From 1940 he served in the British Army during the Second World War in Europe, being demobilised in 1946. He moved to Australia from England in 1953. Following much photography and study of Australian birds, and the publication of illustrated papers on their biology in the Emu, he returned to England to take a BSc (Hons) in 1965 and in 1968 a master's degree at the University of Durham.

Warham then moved to Christchurch, New Zealand where he was a reader in zoology at the University of Canterbury until 1987. He completed a PhD thesis at the University of Canterbury on the breeding biology and behaviour of Eudyptes penguins in 1973. He led several biological expeditions to the New Zealand subantarctic islands. He received a Doctor of Science degree from Durham in 1985.

He joined the Royal Australasian Ornithologists Union (RAOU) in 1963 and was elected a Fellow of the RAOU in 1992. Also in 1992, he was awarded the RAOU's D.L. Serventy Medal, which recognises excellence in published work on birds in the Australasian region. In 1998 he was elected a Fellow of the Ornithological Society of New Zealand. In the 2001 Queen's Birthday Honours, he was appointed a Member of the New Zealand Order of Merit, for services to ornithology.

== Bibliography ==
As well as numerous published scientific papers, books he has authored or coauthored include:

- 1951 - Bird-Watcher's Delight. Country Life: London.
- 1956 - The Technique of Bird Photography. Focal Press: London. (With further editions in 1966, 1976 and 1983).
- 1966 - The Technique of Wildlife Cinematography. Focal Press: London.
- 1971 - The Handbook of Australian Sea-birds. Reed: Sydney. (With Dominic and Vincent Serventy).
- 1990 - The Petrels. Their Ecology and Breeding Systems. Academic Press: London.
- 1996 - The Behaviour, Population Biology and Physiology of the Petrels. Academic Press: London.
