= Dominic Serventy =

Australian ornithologist (1904–1988)

President of the Royal Australasian Ornithologists Union
- In office 1947–1949

Personal details
- Born: Dominic Louis Serventy; 28 March 1904; Brown Hill, Western Australia
- Died: 8 August 1988 (aged 84)
- Occupation: Ornithologist, author

Dominic Louis Serventy (28 March 1904 – 8 August 1988) was an Australian ornithologist. He was president of the Royal Australasian Ornithologists Union (RAOU) 1947–1949. He assisted with the initial organisation of the British Museum's series of Harold Hall Australian ornithological collecting expeditions during the 1960s, also participating in the third (1965) expedition.

== Early life ==
Serventy was born at Brown Hill, Western Australia to parents of Croatian origin. He was educated at the University of Western Australia and Cambridge University.

== Career ==
Serventy co-authored (with H. M. Whittell) of Birds of Western Australia, (published in five editions between 1948 and 1976), and (with John Warham and his brother Vincent Serventy, a popular naturalist) of The Handbook of Australian Sea-birds (1971).

== Legacy ==
Serventy is commemorated by the RAOU's D.L. Serventy Medal which is awarded annually for outstanding published work on birds in the Australasian region.

Dominic Serventy is commemorated in the scientific name of a species of Australian lizard, Ctenotus serventyi. Dominic and Vincent Serventy are commemorated in the species' epithet of the extinct cormorant Microcarbo serventyorum, described by Gerard Frederick van Tets in 1994.

== Honours ==
- 1952 – elected a Fellow of the RAOU
- 1956 – awarded the Australian Natural History Medallion
- 1970 – awarded the Tasmanian Royal Society Medal
- 1972 – appointed Ridder (Knight) in the Most Excellent Order of the Golden Ark by Prince Bernhard of the Netherlands
