= Questagame =

2014 photography game

QuestaGame
- Developer: QuestaGame
- Release: 2014
- Operating system: Android, iOS
- Website: questagame.com

QuestaGame, launched in 2014 in Canberra, Australia, is a mobile app game for photographing and identifying fauna, flora, and fungi. Sightings are verified by experts and gain points for players. The game leverages citizen science to help document species occurrences, adding data to databases such as Atlas of Living Australia. Ranger Vision is a classroom version. QuestaGame has been reported as driving citizen science by mapping biodiversity, discovering new species, and averting biosecurity risks.

== Gameplay ==
To play the game, players submit sightings and/or identify the sightings of other players. The game defines sightings as documentation of a wild (not captive or domesticated) living organism. Players earn gold and increase their species collections, which are recorded on a leaderboard. Players can use gold to purchase better "equipment" and "supplies." The level of equipment rating determines the speed and detail that sightings are identified by other players, while supplies allow players to join and create quests.

Players can join clans and compete with others in quests and challenges. Many clans join to form tribes.

=== Species identification model ===
The founder of QuestaGame, Andrew Robinson, advocates for "collective intelligence," where the expertise of humans is used for species identification, rather automated species identification through machine learning. Robinson describes QuestaGame's “Pays-to-Know” program, which results in earnings going to a scientific institution of the experts' choice, as a means to leverage the value of environmental knowledge and possibly help to create meaningful jobs.

=== World BioQuest ===
In 2017 QuestaGame reported results from its World BioQuest 20–22 May 2017: 11,646 observations, 2,440 photos, 9,403 identifications and 689 species. The winning World BioQuest Champion was a player named Austin. The highest scoring single sighting was an image of a stick insect (Onchestus gorgus), by QuestaGamer Ben Revell. The stick insect was identified by Dr. Paul Brock of the Natural History Museum, London, as the first photographic record of the species on major biodiversity databases. "Best Photo" was a Brown Tree Snake (Boiga irregularis) by Ben Revell. The BioQuest commemorated the International Day of Biological Diversity and involved 30 different environmental organisations.

== Discoveries ==
Seven new species of spiders have been discovered through QuestaGame. In 2018 a species of spider was discovered by QuestaGamer Ben Revell and was named Ornodolmedes benrevelli after the gamer.

In March 2018, one player reported the first known sighting of a particular invasive wasp in Victoria (possibly the European paper wasp, Polistes dominula), highlighting the use of sightings in helping biocontrol efforts. Two QuestaGame players in Sydney submitted sightings of an invasive gecko species the Indo-Pacific or fox gecko (Hemidactylus garnottii) previously not known to exist in Australia. The biosecurity authorities in New South Wales were alerted and a sample was collected.

== Awards ==
- Eureka Prize for Innovation in Citizen Science, Finalist, 2018
- Myer Foundation, Innovation, 2016-17
- National Science Week 2015 & 2017
- ACT Innovation, 2016
- Purves Environmental Fund 2014
- Norman Wettenhall Foundation 2014
