= Little Ripper =

Type of drone aircraft

Little Ripper is a drone that can be deployed by surf lifesavers to locate and assist swimmers in trouble by providing aerial observation and liferafts. It was developed by Kevin Weldon after watching a UAV search for survivors in the aftermath of Hurricane Katrina.

In early 2018, it was involved in a rescue off Lennox Head where it dropped an inflatable life-raft to two tired swimmers, the first rescue by a drone.
