= Stephen Davies (ornithologist) =

Australian administrator and ornithologist (1935–2020)

Stephen John James Frank Davies (26 April 1935 – 29 October 2020) was an Australian administrator and ornithologist. He worked for the CSIRO Division of Wildlife Research in Western Australia (1964–1984). He carried out research on emus and magpie geese. He was a member of the Royal Australasian Ornithologists Union (RAOU), President (1975–1978) and Chairman of the RAOU Research Committee (1975–1984). He was elected a Fellow of the RAOU in 1984. From 1984 to 1988 he also served the RAOU as its first paid (albeit part-time) Director.
