= William T. Cooper =

Australian ornithological artist (1934–2015)

William T. Cooper AO
- Born: William Thomas Cooper; 6 April 1934; Newcastle, New South Wales, Australia
- Died: 10 May 2015 (aged 81); Malanda, Queensland, Australia
- Education: Newcastle Boys' High School
- Occupation: Artist
- Years active: 1964–2015
- Known for: Internationally acclaimed bird artist who paints birds and wildlife in Australia and Papua New Guinea
- Spouses: Marie MacEnearney; Robyn MacIntosh; Wendy Elizabeth Price
- Children: Darryl Cooper
- Awards: AO (1994) Gold Medal of the Academy of Natural Sciences (USA) for distinction in natural history art 1992, Honorary Doctorate Australian National University 2015
- Website: www.williamtcooper.com.au

Notes
- Encyclopedia of Australian Science, Who's Who Australia

William Thomas Cooper AO (6 April 1934 – 10 May 2015) was an Australian artist. William was born in Adamstown NSW Australia to Coral Bird and William Cooper. He had one brother, Buddy Cooper. He was originally a self-taught landscape and seascape artist but achieved renown through natural history scientific paintings, especially of birds. Cooper also became a taxidermist in his teenage years.

== Life ==
The first book for which Cooper supplied the paintings was Portfolio of Australian Birds, written by Keith Hindwood in 1967. Later, he illustrated Parrots of the World, Birds of Paradise and Bowerbirds, Australian Parrots, Kingfishers and Related Birds, The Cockatoos (a Portfolio of all Species), Turacos (a Portfolio of all Species) and " Pigeons and Doves in Australia" all authored by Joseph Forshaw.

In 1992 the Academy of Natural Sciences in Philadelphia, Pennsylvania, presented Cooper with its gold medal for "artistic endeavors and life's work which have contributed to mankind's better understanding and appreciation of living things". He was the first Australian recipient in the academy's 180-year history. Then, in 1994, Cooper was awarded the Order of Australia (AO) for his contribution to art and natural history.

Cooper's work is held in many collections and institutions around the world, including the National Library of Australia and the State Library of New South Wales. Papua New Guinea's government purchased the entire collection from Birds of Paradise and Bowerbirds and commissioned from him two sets of postage stamps. He also illustrated Visions of a Rainforest by Stanley Breeden and Fruits of the Rainforest and Fruits of the Australian Tropical Rainforest by Wendy Cooper. In 2011 he wrote and illustrated Capturing the Essence, a book that illustrates and describes techniques for artists.

The hard-won knowledge of his subjects which Cooper acquired is evident in his paintings, which display extreme precision, and he usually insisted on painting the birds in their distinct natural environments, down to the exact foods they eat. Preferring to draw from life, rather than depending on photographs as the main source of material for his work, he would often venture into wild, untamed parts of the world to capture the exact display of the birds he painted. He lived with his wife, Wendy Cooper, a self-taught botanist who has authored four substantial books, in north Queensland where his studio was surrounded by tropical rainforest.

Sir David Attenborough described Cooper as "Australia's greatest living scientific painter of birds; he is possibly the best in the world". In 1993, Sir David made a film about Cooper, called Portrait Painter to the Birds. A biography, An Eye For Nature — The Life and Art of William T. Cooper, written by Penny Olsen and published by The National Library of Australia, was launched in February 2014. Olsen described Cooper as "one of the finest bird illustrators ever."

William Cooper was married three times, first to Marie MacEnearney and then Robyn MacIntosh and finally Wendy Elizabeth Price. In December 2014, Cooper and his wife Wendy both received Honorary Doctorates from the Australian National University: Bill for his contributions at the intersection between art and science, and Wendy for her botanical research. Cooper died at his home in Topaz, Queensland, on 10 May 2015.

== Illustrated art works ==
Books illustrated by Cooper include:

- 1968 – A Portfolio of Australian Birds (text by Keith Hindwood)
- 1973 – Parrots of the World (text by Joseph Forshaw)
- 1975 – The Year of the Koala (text by H.D. Williamson)
- 1977 – The Birds of Paradise and Bower Birds (text by Joseph Forshaw)
- 1981 – Australian Parrots (2nd edition, text by Joseph Forshaw)
- 1983–1994 – Kingfishers and Related Birds
- 1993 – Visions of a Rainforest : A Year in Australia's Tropical Rainforest (text by Stanley Breeden)
- 1994 – Fruits of the Rainforest (text by Wendy Cooper)
- 1997 – Turacos: A Portfolio of All Species (text by Joseph Forshaw)
- 1998 – The Birds of Paradise: Paradisaeidae (text by Clifford Frith and Bruce Beehler)
- 2001 – Cockatoos: A Portfolio of All Species (text by Joseph Forshaw)
- 2002 – Turacos : A Natural History of the Musophagidae (text by Joseph Forshaw)
- 2002 – Australian Parrots (3rd [revised] edition, text by Joseph Forshaw)
- 2004 – Fruits of the Australian Tropical Rainforest (text by Wendy Cooper)
- 2012 – Australian Rainforest Fruits - A Field Guide (text by Wendy Cooper)
- 2014 – An Eye For Nature - The Life and Art of William T. Cooper (Biography by Penny Olsen)
- 2015 – Pigeons and doves in Australia (text by Joseph Forshaw)

Books illustrated & written by Cooper include:

- 2012 – Capturing the Essence — Techniques for Bird Artists

== Awards ==
- 1992 – awarded the Gold Medal of the Academy of Natural Sciences (USA) for distinction in natural history art
- 1994 – appointed Officer of the Order of Australia for contributions to art and ornithology
