= Angus Hargreaves Robinson =

Angus Hargreaves Robinson (22 July 1907 – 17 October 1973) was the owner of a grazing property, 'Yanjettee', at Coolup, Western Australia, as well as being an amateur ornithologist. He made important studies of the birds on his property, including Australian magpies and Magpie-larks. He was a member of the Royal Australasian Ornithologists Union (RAOU), and made a Fellow of the RAOU in 1970.
