= Henry Kendall =

Henry Kendall may refer to:

== People ==
- Henry Edward Kendall (1776–1875), English architect
  - Henry Edward Kendall Jr. (1805–1885), his son, also an architect
- Henry Ernest Kendall (1864–1949), farmer, physician and Lieutenant Governor of Nova Scotia
- Henry George Kendall (1874–1965), British sea captain
- Henry H. Kendall, (1855–1943), American architect
- Henry Kendall (actor) (1897–1962), British stage and film character actor
- Henry Kendall (ornithologist) (1849–1934), Australian ornithologist
- Henry Kendall (poet) (1839–1882), Australian poet
- Henry P. Kendall (1878–1959), American industrialist, philanthropist, father of Henry Way Kendall
- Henry Kendall (urban planner) (1903–1983), British architect
- Henry Way Kendall (1926–1999), American physicist and Nobel laureate

== Places ==
- Henry Kendall College, earlier name of what is now the University of Tulsa

== See also ==
- Harry Kendall (disambiguation)
