= Gordon Binns =

Amateur ornithologist

- Binns at age 18 (c. 1917), photographed in London, England.
- Born: 1 March 1899; Yarraville, Victoria
- Died: 24 September 1976 (aged 77); Blackburn, Victoria
- Known for: involvement with Royal Australasian Ornithologists Union

Gordon Binns (1 March 1899 – 24 September 1976) was an Australian bank manager and amateur ornithologist, notable for his involvement with the Royal Australasian Ornithologists Union. He was Secretary of the organisation during the periods 1953–56 and 1959–63, and President from 1965–66.

== Early life and career ==
Binns was born on 1 March 1899 in Yarraville, Victoria, and spent his boyhood years in the Victorian townships of Great Western and Victoria. In 1914, after leaving school, he began working at the State Savings Bank of Victoria. At age 17, during the First World War, he enlisted in the First Australian Imperial Force, as a member of the 2nd Australian Machine Gun Company. He was wounded in northern France on 10 August 1918, during the Australian attack on Lihons, and spent more than a month in hospital recovering from his injuries. After the war, he remained in England for two years, before returning to Australia and his employment at the State Savings Bank.

== Natural history ==
After 1938, Binns served at several bank branches in rural Victoria, including Cobram (1938–144), Ouyen (1945–47) and Terang (1948–50). During this period, he began writing about natural history, publishing "Notes for Birdland" in Savings Weekly, the journal of the State Savings Bank. For 20 years, he published "The Out of Doors", a weekly column in the Terang Express, using the pen name Neophema. In 1943, he joined the Royal Australasian Ornithologists Union. He published several articles in the Union's flagship journal, The Emu, including "Birds of Terang, South-western Victoria". In his final years with the State Savings Bank, Binns was manager at several suburban branches (1951–56), at Horsham (1957–1960) and Box Hill (1961–64). During this period, he was also a prominent member of the Royal Australasian Ornithologists Union, serving as their Secretary from 1953–56 and again from 1959–63, and President from 1965–66.

== Death and legacy ==
Binns died in Blackburn, Victoria on 24 September 1976, just a few months after the death of his wife, Ilma. He was survived by his three daughters, Ruth, Phyllis and Meredith, and his son Greg. In an obituary published in the journal The Emu, W.R. Wheeler wrote that "As one who worked with him on Council, I regarded his diligence and energy, particularly over his correspondence with members throughout Australia and overseas, as outstanding. He was truly one of the old school."
