= Arnold Robert McGill =

Arnold Robert McGill OAM (1905–1988) was a Sydney-based Australian businessman and amateur ornithologist. He was President of the Royal Australasian Ornithologists Union (RAOU) 1958–1959, and elected a Fellow of the RAOU in 1965. He was Assistant Editor of the RAOU journal, the Emu 1948-1969 and compiled indexes to it until his death. He coauthored, with Keith Hindwood, The Birds of Sydney (1958). He was a recipient of the Medal of the Order of Australia.
