= Archibald George Campbell =

Archibald George Campbell (1880–1954) was an Australian orchardist and amateur ornithologist. He was the son of Archibald James Campbell. With his father, he was a founding member of the Royal Australasian Ornithologists Union (RAOU) and was President of the organisation 1934–1935. He was elected a Fellow of the RAOU in 1941. He was also a founding member of the Bird Observers Club in 1905.
