= Kevin Weldon =

Australian publisher (1933–2023)

Kevin Ernest Weldon
- Born: Kevin Ernest Weldon; 14 December 1933; Ingham, Queensland, Australia
- Died: 9 November 2023 (aged 89)
- Occupations: Book publisher, businessman, philanthropist
- Children: 3

Kevin Ernest Weldon AO (14 December 1933 – 9 November 2023) was an Australian book publisher, businessman, and philanthropist. As a publisher, he worked for the Paul Hamlyn Group and later for his own companies. He founded the Earthwatch Institute environmental charity and Hanna-Barbera Pty, Ltd., as well as the Australian division of Hanna-Barbera in 1972. He was the founding president of the International Life Saving Federation and a member of the Surf Life Saving Australia president's board. In 1994, he was recognised with the Order of Australia for his contribution to water safety as president of the ILS's World Life-Saving movement, and for service to the publishing industry. On 10 June 2024, he was posthumously promoted to Officer of the Order of Australia for distinguished service in national and international surf life-saving, publishing, animal welfare, and philanthropic endeavours.

== Early life ==
Weldon was born on 14 December 1933 in Ingham, Queensland, the youngest of five children. His father, Vivian, was the local Ford dealer. At the start of World War II, the family moved to Brisbane where, at the age of 15, he joined the Pacific Surf Club as a cadet, which sparked his interest in the surf life-saving movement. Throughout the years, he rose through the ranks of the club, eventually becoming president. At this time, the club was one of the most reputable in Queensland.

Weldon attended the Brisbane Grammar School, but left in early 1949 because of the sudden death of his mother. He later enrolled in night classes at a local college, where he studied colour etching.

== Career ==
=== Early career (1953–1962) ===
Weldon began his career at the Brisbane Truth newspaper in the process engraving department, working with the halftone colour etcher. Shortly after, he joined the Royal Australian Naval Reserve, becoming a lieutenant in 1956.

By 1957, Weldon had established a new branch of Grenville Publishing in Queensland and employed a staff of eight. Two years later, he was appointed general manager of sales and moved to Sydney. In 1963, he published his first book, Cake Decorating and Icing by Beryl Guertner.

=== Paul Hamlyn Group Australia (1964–1979) ===
In 1964, Weldon left Grenville's to help establish the Australian division of Paul Hamlyn Group.

Weldon also launched the record label Music for Pleasure, through which he introduced music into major supermarkets, including Woolworths and Coles.

In 1971, he became president of the World Life-Saving Movement, started by the International Life-Saving Federation (ILS).

The following year, he established Australia's first large-scale animation studio, a joint venture with Hanna-Barbera. The venture, Hanna-Barbera Australia, evolved into Neil Balnaves' Southern Star Group. Paul Hamlyn Group acquired Australian publishers Lansdowne Press, Ure Smith, and Jacaranda. He continued to build a bestselling list in Australia and developed local publishing lists in New Zealand and the Philippines. He also developed a limited edition list and expanded the Heritage partworks to include Australia's Wildlife Heritage under the imprint Lansdowne Press.

=== Australian publishing (1980–1989) ===
In 1980, Weldon founded Kevin Weldon & Associates and achieved success with A Day in the Life of Australia, with subsequent volumes produced in India, China, Africa, the Soviet Union and the United States. In the following years, he entered the local US market with joint ventures, notably in Texas. He also guided the takeover of British publisher Marshall Cavendish by Straits Times, Singapore.

In 1984, Weldon founded Weldon Owen Publishing with John Owen. The first US office was set up in Seattle, Washington, in 1988 and moved to San Francisco a year later.

He also formed a joint venture with newspaper groups John Fairfax Ltd and David Syme Ltd for "Australians: A Historical Library". In 1985, he purchased 50% of the Paul Hamlyn Group with James Hardie Industries Ltd under a new entity, Weldon Hardie Group, three years later he bought our Hardie's share to own the company outright changing the name to the Weldon International. Retail sales increased and Weldon diversified, taking an interest in films and developing complementary book products, including Wall of Iron and Over China.

=== International publishing (1990–2000s) ===
Kevin Weldon initiated a policy of devolution in which Weldon International was recast into smaller publishing and marketing units, operating independently. With no territorial limits imposed, export was encouraged, and Weldon International exports would account for 55% of Australia's total export of book products. The group's policy of devolution spurred growth, and Weldon International rose to 183rd on Australia's top 500 exporters list. In 2010, Weldon returned to Australian publishing to launch the 30th-anniversary edition of the Macquarie Encyclopedic Dictionary and re-launch What Bird is That by Neville Cayley. In 2012, Weldon launched The New Long March, a co-publishing project between China's Qingdao Publishing Group and Weldon International. The book, celebrating the 75th Anniversary of the Long March, was launched at the London Book Fair and included an augmented reality feature, revealing extra content using an app.

=== The Ripper Group ===
In 2015, Weldon established The Ripper Group, an organization using remotely piloted aircraft systems and broad education in the field of search and rescue.

== Community service and philanthropy ==
In the 1980s, Weldon founded Earthwatch Australia, an organization supporting scientific research expeditions. He also established Gwinganna in the Gold Coast hinterland for Indigenous study groups.

He served on many committees and boards, including the Powerhouse Museum (Sydney) and the Institute of Aboriginal Studies (Canberra).

He supported sanctuaries for Australian native animals and played a role in introducing the wildlife search and rescue drone initiative of the NSW Wildlife Information Rescue and Education Service (WIRES) in 2019.

=== Life-saving support ===
Weldon stated that his activities in the life-saving movement contributed to his success. He joined the Pacific Surf Club as a fifteen-year-old cadet during 1948 / 49, and within a year, became the social organizer. He held the posts of vice-captain, captain, chief instructor, and president. The club acquired land through Weldon's initiative, taking bank loans and organizing the sale of chickens through hotels to pay off the debt. He was a trustee of the club in Sydney, where he provided guidance and promoted its commercial viability.

In 1970, after serving as the Queensland delegate to the National Council of Surf Lifesaving, Weldon was asked to form an international life-saving group. He accepted on the condition that it would be truly international, with the headquarters moving around the world. This led to innovations on Australia's beaches, including 'rubber ducky' inflatable rescue boats, torpedo rescue tubes and the use of helicopters in surf rescue; such ideas were shared through what became known as World Life-saving.

Kevin Weldon was a member of the President's Board of the National Council of Surf Lifesaving Association of Australia.

In the 1990s, he became the founding president of the newly formed International Life-Saving Federation, which combined World Lifesaving with professional lifeguard associations and pool lifesavers. The International Life-Saving Federation has since grown to include over sixty member countries and over 25 million members.

== Personal life ==
In 1994, Weldon was awarded the Order of Australia for his contribution to water safety as president of World Life-Saving and for his service to the publishing industry. He was posthumously promoted to Officer of the Order of Australia in the 2024 King's Birthday Honours.

Weldon was married and had three children. He died on 9 November 2023.
