= James Allen Keast =

Australian ornithologist

James Allen Keast (15 November 1922 – 8 March 2009) was an Australian ornithologist, and Professor of Biology at Queen's University, Kingston, Ontario, Canada. Born in Turramurra, New South Wales, he performed war service 1941–1945 in New Guinea and New Britain. He earned his BSc (1950) and MSc (1952) degrees at the University of Sydney, going on to earn an MA (1954) and PhD (1955) from Harvard. He started the first natural history series on Australian television in 1958–1960. A long-time member and benefactor of the Royal Australasian Ornithologists Union (RAOU), he was elected a Fellow of the RAOU in 1960. Keast joined the faculty of Queen's in 1962, and in 1989 became a professor emeritus. In 1995 he was awarded the D.L. Serventy Medal for outstanding published work on birds in the Australasian region. As well as numerous scientific papers, he authored and edited several books.

Keast endowed a postgraduate student award - Birds Australia's (formerly Royal Australasian Ornithologists Union) Professor Allen Keast Research Award. At Queen's, the J. Allen Keast Lake Opinicon Undergraduate Research Fellowship provides funds for an undergraduate to carry out summer study at Queen's University Biological Station. The J. Allen Keast Field Biology International Exchange Fund assists exchanges of biologists between Queen's and universities in the southern hemisphere.

The fictional city-state of Keastipol, on the coast of the Great Southern Continent of K.V. Johansen's children's novel Torrie and the Firebird, was named after Keast.

== Bibliography ==
- Window to Bushland (1959)
- Bush Birds (1960)
- Australian Bird Songs (1964)
- Australian Bush Sounds (1966)
- Australia and the Pacific Islands: a natural history (1966)
- Ecological biogeography of Australia (ed.) (1981)
- Evolution, mammals, and southern continents (ed.) (1972)
- Bush birds of Australia (1973)
- Birds of Eucalypt Forests and Woodlands: Ecology, Conservation, Management (ed.) (1985)
- The origin and evolution of Pacific island biotas, New Guinea to eastern Polynesia : patterns and processes (ed.) (1996)
- Bird watcher to professional ecologist : a humorous career (2008)
