= New Guinea free-tailed bat =

Conservation status
- Least Concern (IUCN 3.1)

Scientific classification
- Kingdom: Animalia
- Phylum: Chordata
- Class: Mammalia
- Order: Chiroptera
- Family: Molossidae
- Genus: Austronomus
- Species: A. kuboriensis

Binomial name
- Austronomus kuboriensis (McKean and Calaby, 1968)

Species of bat

The New Guinea free-tailed bat (Austronomus kuboriensis), sometimes designated the New Guinea mastiff bat, is a species of free-tailed bat that inhabits the Chimbu highlands of Papua New Guinea. Although Koopman described A. kuboriensis as a subspecies of the nearby A. australis, the 2005 reference catalogue Mammal Species of the World suggested that analysis had established these as distinct species.

== See also ==
- List of mammals of Papua New Guinea
