= Barren Grounds Bird Observatory =

The Barren Grounds Bird Observatory was a bird observatory situated in the Barren Grounds Nature Reserve on the escarpment of the Southern Highlands of New South Wales, Australia. It was opened in 1982 by Birds Australia as Australia's third bird observatory, in order to provide a base for the study and enjoyment of the birds of the area. The natural vegetation of Barren Grounds is heathland. Birds of note include the eastern ground parrot and the eastern bristlebird. In 2004, for basically economic reasons, the observatory was closed and Birds Australia's association with Barren Grounds ended.
