= Henry Kendall (ornithologist) =

English ornithologist (1849–1934)

Henry Kendall (1849–1934), was a founding member of the Royal Australasian Ornithologists Union (1901), and a founding co-editor of its journal the Emu. Born in Pavenham, England, when he was six years old, his family migrated to Australia and settled at Orange, New South Wales, where he grew up. The rest of his life was spent in Victoria.
