= Robert Hall (ornithologist) =

Robert Hall (19 October 1867 – 19 September 1949) was a founding member of the Royal Australasian Ornithologists Union (RAOU) in 1901, and served as its President 1912–1913.

Hall was born in Lal Lal, Victoria, Australia. Hall made an expedition to Siberia, via Japan and Korea from 1903, with R. E. Trebilcock, to discover the previously unknown breeding grounds of various species of waders. His published works include A Key to the Birds of Australia and Tasmania (1899), and Australian Bird Maps (1922).

Hall died in New Norfolk, Tasmania, Australia.
