= Harry Kendall =

Harry Kendall may refer to:

- Harry Kendall (wrestler) (died 2015), English wrestler
- Harry Kendall (decathlete) (born 1996), English decathlete

== See also ==
- Henry Kendall (disambiguation)
- Harry Kendall Thaw (1871–1947), American heir notable for murdering the renowned architect Stanford White
