= Margaret Cameron (librarian) =

Australian amateur ornithologist, librarian and administrator (1937–2023)

Margaret Alison Cameron AM, FRAOU (1937 – 2023) was a noted Australian librarian, administrator, and amateur ornithologist. She was the foundation librarian of Deakin University between 1977 and 1996, and pro vice-chancellor of the University from 1986 to 1990. She joined the Royal Australasian Ornithologists Union (RAOU) in 1969 which she served as President from 1986 to 1989.

== Personal life ==
Cameron was born in Queensland Australia on 10 September 1937. As a child, her interest in birds was fostered by her father and life in the country. However, this initial interest remained dormant until opportunities through becoming a librarian for Flinders University arose for field trips and educational lectures that sparked a deeper passion for birding and conservation. Following her stint at Flinders, Cameron moved on to Macquarie University from 1969 to 1977. It was here that she honed her skills in field ornithology, and inspired other birders with her enthusiasm and enquiring mind.

== Career ==
Cameron began her career as a librarian at the Public Library of Queensland from 1959 to 1962. She spent the following year in the United States of America at the Australian Reference Library in New York. She returned to Australia in 1964 to be Thatcher Librarian at the University of Queensland. From 1965 to 1969 she worked at Flinders University. Following this, she moved to New South Wales to be a Reader Services Librarian at Macquarie University where she stayed until 1977. In 1977 Cameron became the foundation librarian at Deakin University where she worked until her retirement in 1990. During this period between 1980 and 1987 she was also the editor of the Geelong Naturalist, a publication of the Geelong Field Naturalists Club.

She returned to Queensland before her death in September 2023.

== Awards and recognition ==
Cameron received the following awards and recognitions;

- 1987 Fellow of the Library Association of Australia
- 1990 Member of the Order of Australia for "service to library services, education and to ornithology"
- 1993 Fellow of the RAOU
- 1999 honorary Doctor of the University from Deakin University
- 1999 was awarded Australian Natural History Medallion

Cameron was the recipient of an Australian American Education Foundation (Fulbright) University Administrator Grant as well as a British Council Cultural Visitor.
