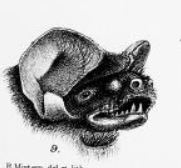

Conservation status
- Least Concern (IUCN 3.1)

Scientific classification
- Kingdom: Animalia
- Phylum: Chordata
- Class: Mammalia
- Order: Chiroptera
- Family: Molossidae
- Genus: Austronomus
- Species: A. australis

Binomial name
- Austronomus australis (Gray, 1838)

Synonyms
- Molossus australis Gray, 1838; Tadarida australis (Gray, 1838); Nyctinomus australis (Gray, 1838)

= White-striped free-tailed bat =

Species of bat

The white-striped free-tailed bat (Austronomus australis) is a species of bat in the family Molossidae. Its echolocation calls are audible to humans, which is a characteristic found in only a few microbat species. The species was formerly classified as Tadarida australis.

== Taxonomy ==
The first description of the species was published in 1838 by John Edward Gray, in a review of material at the British Museum of Natural History. The author noted the source of the specimen, a skin and skull, as New South Wales and placed it with the genus Molossus. When providing a description in Furred Animals of Australia, Ellis Troughton suggested that the specimen examined by Gray was obtained at Camden, a property owned by John Macarthur. Troughton first proposed the species be distinguished as a monotypic genus Austronomus, this arrangement was eventually resurrected when the taxon was separated from the previously accepted placement in the widespread genus Tadarida.

Koopman included these species in Tadarida with T. kuboriensis as a subspecies of T. australis. Gregorin and Cirranello found that these two species formed a clade distinct from other Tadarida, differing in eight morphological characters. The most significant of these is a keel present between the nostrils, a synapomorphy combining this clade. Likewise, T. kuboriensis and T. australis lack hair on the tragus and do not have thornlike hairs on the face. The presence of hair on the tragus is a synapomorphy for non-Australasian Tadarida. Based on these results, Gregorin and Cirranello (2016) recommended recognition of Austronomus Troughton 1943 based on the type species Molossus australis Gray, 1834.

== Description ==
The white-striped free-tailed bat is robust in build and the largest of the eleven Australian molossids. The colour of the pelage is a deep chocolate brown, with well defined white stripes beneath the wing; occasional patches of white may appear at the upper ventral side. Individuals have a mass of 33 to 41 grams, and average of 37 g, and a head and body length of 85 to 100 millimetres. The free tail extends 40 to 55 mm from the body and can be folded during high speed flight to reduce drag. The forearm length range is 57-63 mm. It has a condylobasal length of 23–24 mm. The skull is dorso-ventrally flattened. The baculum is divided into three lobes.

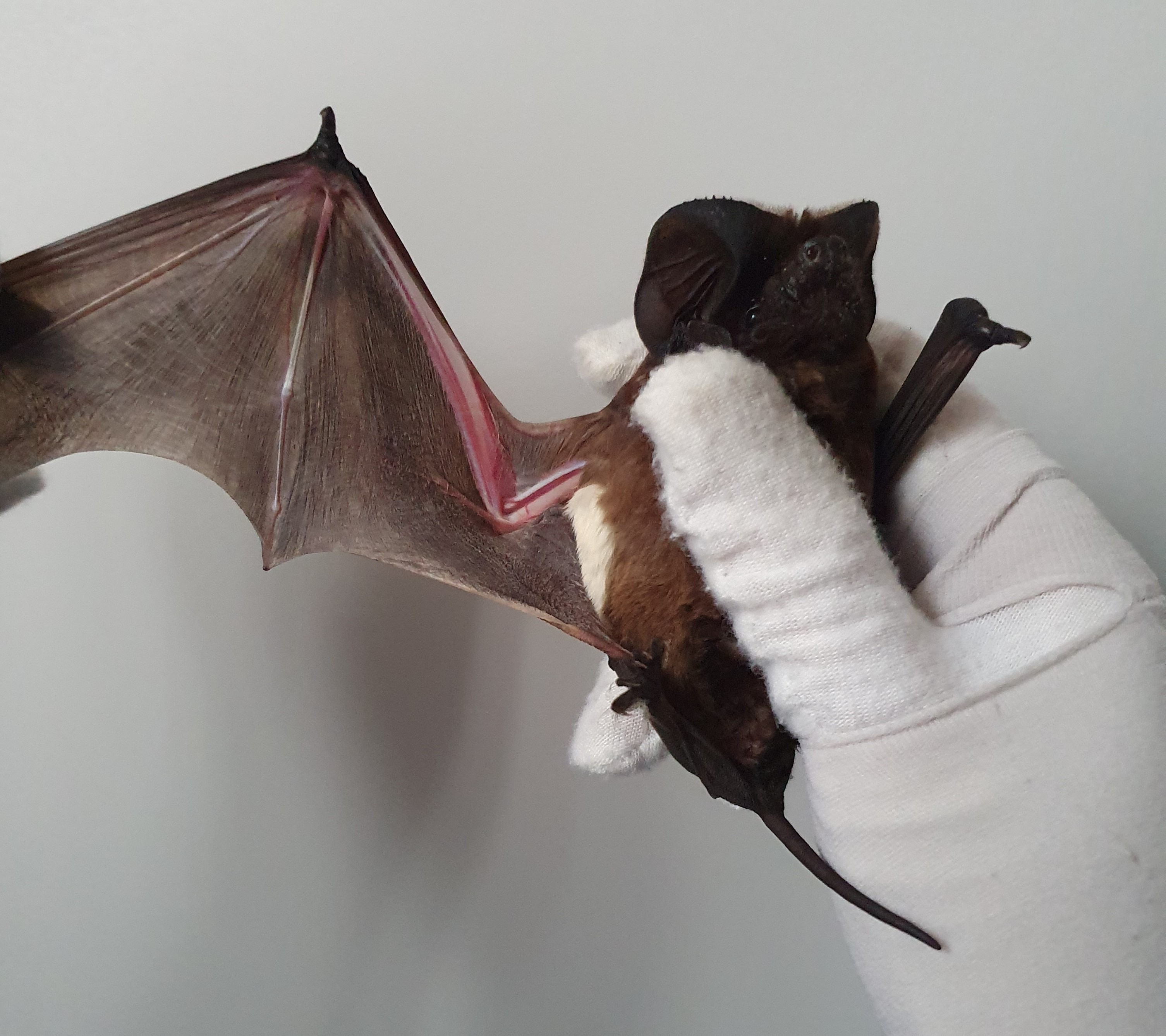
The white-striped free-tail bat is named for the distinctive stripes of white fur on the underside where the wings meet the body.

This species has a wingtip shaped similarly to the crescent form found on fast-flying birds and on the caudal fins of fast-swimming fish. These tips have leading edges that curve around to chordwise orientation and have trailing edges with aft-sweep or zero-sweep over the outer half of the tip. This bat's wings are considered as having low camber sections with faired humerus and radius bones, typical leading-edge flaps and surface disjunctions and protuberances. This allows this interceptor species to optimise for least drag generation at the expense of maximum lift ability at high speeds. The white-striped free-tailed bat can reach speeds of up to 17 m/s.

The large, forward pointed ears are 20 to 25 mm in length and assist in their aerodynamic lift. The ears are exceptionally broad and noticeably ribbed. A short hairless tragus is present and also points forward. The inner margins of the ears touch, but are not joined where they meet on the head. The upper lip is deeply wrinkled, and this species have single incisor teeth on each of the frontal cranial bones of the upper jaw. Both sexes have a throat pouch. The colour of the skin is very dark, blackish, with a slight pink hue. Fur colour varies with dark brown dorsally and lighter ventrally. A distinctive pattern of white fur on each side of the body progresses from the front to the back where the wings fold against the body, giving this species its common name, white-striped free-tailed bat. This species displays sexual dimorphism with the male being larger.

== Echolocation ==
The white-striped free-tailed bat typical call has been recorded between 10-15 kHz. The species emits one to two calls per second and unlike the ultrasonic signals of most microchiropterans these are audible to humans. The sounds is described as "pink-pink-pink" or a "metallic ting-ting-ting". Research by Herr and Klomp into the white-striped free-tailed bat's calls showed that vocalisation changed at different stages of flight. In the initial stages of flight, after release, this species used steep frequency modulated pulse, from 27 kHz to 13 kHz, changing to a low frequency modulated pulse when flying above a canopy. Once there the call structure changes to the more typical white-striped free-tailed bat call with a constant frequency with a divergence between maximum and minimum frequency of 5 kHz. All echolocating bats use a terminal phase buzz call to locate, close in and capture their prey.

== Distribution and habitat ==
An endemic species to Australia, the white-striped free-tailed bat is widespread and common. They are seasonally migratory but not recorded in the northern third of the continent nor previously known on the southern island of Tasmania. However, surveys conducted in Tasmania between 2009 and 2013 indicated the species is present and maybe a periodic visitor or vagrant in Tasmania. In Western Australia this species is restricted south of the 20°S latitude during the breeding season, the austral spring and summer, then extending north in the winter. This species can be found in most habitats from closed forest to open flood plain, and occurs in urban areas, in regions across temperate and subtropical Australia.

== Roosts ==
In the Greater Brisbane Region of South East Queensland the white-striped free-tail bat uses over-mature to dead eucalypt species with large tree diameters (>89 cm) as roost habitats. These trees have developed large trunk cavities, often extending throughout the trunk and major branches. The bats access these cavities through multiple unobstructed branches and/or trunk hollows. This strategy also allows the bats a direct flight path when leaving the roost cavities which may result in energy savings for the bats and reduce the exposure to predators.

Although single bats spend most of their daytime in separate day-roosts, they spent an average of one day in every eleven within the communal roost. The bats also visited the communal roost for periods of time during their nocturnal activity, and some individuals were recorded twice as often frequenting the communal roost during the night compared with the day.

This bat species is a highly colonial tree-dweller, so that large internal hallows are an important feature in selecting suitable maternity roost sites as population numbers increase during parturition. Therefore, the quality and size of roost space is more important than the selection of a particular species of tree in maternity roost choice.

== Biology and ecology ==
The white-striped free-tailed bat is a specialized high-altitude, fast-flying interceptor insectivore. Their diet consists principally of moths, beetles and bugs.

In South East Queensland, white-striped free-tailed bats demonstrated a significant preference for foraging above flood plain habitat and does not prefer to feed above remnant forests. In northern Australian urban areas, foraging individuals preferred and were in greater concentrations over grassland with few trees, such as golf courses, than over riparian areas, new urban developments, and suburbs that had been established for between 20–50 years. White-striped free-tailed bats once they emerge from their roosts fly rapidly and directly to their foraging area, with individual bats flying up to 20 kilometres (12 mi) to reach their feeding areas. However, some populations have a more localised foraging area. In the greater Brisbane area, foraging areas are usually within 2.5 km (1.6 mi) of day roost and 6.2 km (3.9 mi) of communal roosts. On arrival they reduce their commuting flight speed to a lower sustainable flight speed that allows them to hunt in the foraging area for some hours. The species is agile on hard ground or other firm surfaces. Some researchers report that the bat will also scurry around on the ground chasing ground-dwelling insects such as beetles, bugs, grasshoppers and ants. They are able to do this by folding their wings away neatly so that their forearms are free, retracting their tail membrane and scampering around on their thumbs and hind feet.

Males do not have the ability to store sperm in their vesicular follicles during the winter period, therefore breeding commences late in August. Females give birth to one young between mid-December and mid-January, which indicates a gestation period of about 14 weeks.
