= What Bird Is That? =

1931 book by Neville William Cayley

- 1953 edition
- Author: Neville W. Cayley
- Illustrator: Neville W. Cayley
- Cover artist: Neville W. Cayley
- Language: English
- Subject: Australian birds
- Genre: Field guide
- Publisher: Angus & Robertson: Sydney; Australia's Heritage Publishing
- Publication date: 1931 (1st edn); 2011 (Signature edn)
- Publication place: Australia
- Media type: Print (hardcover) with dustjacket
- Pages: xx + 320; 832pp 460 colour plates
- ISBN: 978-0-9870701-0-4

What Bird Is That? A Guide to the Birds of Australia is a book first published in 1931 by Angus & Robertson in Sydney. Authored and illustrated by Neville William Cayley, it was Australia's first fully illustrated national field guide to birds, a function it served alone for nearly 40 years. In 1960 it was rated the all-time best seller in Australian natural history.

== Beginnings ==
What Bird Is That? was originally published in octavo format (239 x 158 mm), containing 340 pages bound in green buckram, with a dust jacket illustrated with a painting of a laughing kookaburra seated on and within a large red question mark. It contains 36 coloured plates of paintings of Australian birds by the author, as well as several black-and-white photographic plates of habitat. There were numerous reprints and revised editions in various formats produced well into the 1980s.

The first edition was sponsored by the Gould League of Bird Lovers of New South Wales of which Cayley was a Council member. In return for its sponsorship, Cayley offered the Gould League four tenths of his 10% book royalty. However, initial sales were slow and in 1935 he sold his entire share to the League for £300.

The book was extolled fulsomely by S.R. Thomas, of the NSW Department of Education, as follows:

What Bird is That? is the most comprehensive and informative bird book published in the Commonwealth – if not in the world. The coloured plates are a triumph not only of the genius and imagination of the artist – our own Neville Cayley on whom has fallen so fittingly the mantle of his famous father – but also of the block-maker’s and printer’s art. The publishers have done nothing finer of its kind.

The life-like portrayals of our feathered friends, together with the succinct but compendious descriptive information, will place within easy reach of the bird lover, a most valuable vade mecum of bird and bush lore for out of doors as well as a thing of beauty for the library.

Cayley's aim in creating this work was to make available a book that would encourage and help people to learn about and appreciate Australia's remarkable and unique bird life. He saw and responded to a need for a simple book that was accessible to the non-specialist birdwatcher. Each species was illustrated in colour and the birds were organised according to their usual habitat. The accompanying text included brief notes on distribution, breeding and behaviour.

While initial sales were poor, history tells us that Cayley had accurately discerned a market need and successfully responded to it. During WWII sales accelerated and Cayley's first collection, reprinted time and time again, eventually became a household name among birdwatchers and the book was recognised as an Australian classic.

The original sponsorship of What Bird is That? proved a great investment for the Gould League, who benefited from the sale of its numerous reprints and revised editions. By 1960, it was rated the all-time best seller in Australian natural history and is still in print today.

== Cayley's "big bird book" ==
While sales and stature of Cayley's original collection continued to grow, the prolific artist and ornithologist Cayley was working on a much more ambitious project – his so-called "big bird book". From about 1918, he was creating illustrations of subspecies, plumage stages and eggs (now lost) of all known Australian birds. The project was incomplete at the time of his death in 1950, although the illustrations were all but finished.

=== 1984 edition ===
The ornithologist Terence Lindsey revived Cayley's plans in the 1980s, creating the last and most significant revision of What Bird is That? It was published in 1984 and incorporated all of Cayley's paintings created over many years for his vision of releasing a "big bird book" and included a revised taxonomy. In the 53 years since its first edition, more than a hundred new bird species had been identified in Australia. Scientific names had been changed and groups of birds had been reordered. Lindsey brought What Bird is That? up-to-date with the latest birding conventions of the time, as well as contributing a valuable supplementary list of birds and a scholarly catalogue of Cayley's paintings.

=== 2011 edition ===
The Signature Edition What Bird is That? was published by Australia's Heritage Publishing in 2011, the latest release of Cayley's "big bird book" complete with Lindsey's revisions. It is 832 pages, features 769 birds and includes all 460 of Cayley's full-colour paintings, many showing groups of related birds. New to this edition was an accompanying e-book What Bird Call is That?, which identifies and illustrates 101 birds from What Bird is That?, as well as providing sound files of each featured bird's distinctive call. The sound files were provided by David Stewart.

== Popular culture ==
What Bird is That? plays a central role in Australian author Nick Earls' 1999 young adult novel 48 Shades of Brown. The 48 shades refers to the number of distinct browns used by Cayley to describe bird plumage colours.
