= Southern Hemisphere Ornithological Congress =

The Southern Hemisphere Ornithological Congresses (SHOC) comprise a short-lived series of two ornithological conferences focussing on the avifauna of the world's southern continents, seas and islands. Both conferences were held in Australia under the auspices of the Royal Australasian Ornithologists Union (RAOU), following which the series lapsed. At least as far as Australia and New Zealand were concerned, the series was replaced by the ongoing biennial Australasian Ornithological Conference (AOC) series, instigated in 2001 by the RAOU and subsequently cosponsored by the Ornithological Society of New Zealand.

== SHOC meetings ==
- 1996 – Albany, Western Australia
- 2000 – Brisbane, Queensland
