= Vincent Serventy =

Australian author, ornithologist and conservationist

- Vincent Serventy, c. 1975
- Born: Vincent Noel Serventy; 16 January 1916; Armadale, Western Australia
- Died: September 1, 2007 (aged 91); Pearl Beach, New South Wales
- Education: University of Western Australia
- Spouse(s): Carol Serventy, née Darbyshire
- Awards: Natural History Medallion (1974), Member of the Order of Australia (1976), Ridder (Knight) of the Order of the Golden Ark (1980), honorary Degree of Doctor of Science (1998) Macquarie University
- Scientific career
- Fields: Conservationist, Author, Ornithologist

Vincent Noel Serventy AM (6 January 1916 – 8 September 2007) was an Australian author, ornithologist and conservationist.

== Life and career ==
Born in Armadale, Western Australia, the youngest of eight children of migrant Croatian parents, Vincent Serventy graduated from the University of Western Australia in geology and psychology. He was a CSIRO researcher and teacher before beginning a career as a writer, lecturer and film-maker. He joined the Royal Australasian Ornithologists Union (RAOU) in 1942 and served as either its Branch Secretary or State Representative for Western Australia 1943–1959. In 1946 he became a life member of the Wildlife Preservation Society of Australia and was for many years its president.

In 1956 he bought a movie camera and began making documentary films which later led to Australia's first television environment program, Nature Walkabout (1967).

In 1974 he was awarded the Australian Natural History Medallion. In 1976 he was appointed a Member of the Order of Australia.

In 1985 Vincent Serventy assisted the Conservation Council of Western Australia in its unsuccessful campaign to stop a major road being built through the Trigg Regional Open Space. This public land had been identified by the System 6 Study Report to the Environmental Protection Authority as having important conservation value with the bushland extending from the sea to tuart and banksia woodland, a rarity in the metropolitan area. Vincent spoke publicly of the importance of this land for its vegetation, landforms and habitat for local fauna and migratory birds.

Vincent Serventy was a younger brother of the Australian ornithologist Dom Serventy.

Serventy was interviewed in 1972 by Hazel de Berg about his life and career. He was again interviewed in 1996 by Gregg Borschmann about environmental awareness. Both recordings can be found at the National Library of Australia.

== Publications ==
Serventy wrote numerous articles on natural history and conservation. Some of his books are:

- The Archipelago of the Recherche. Part 2: Birds (AGS Report No.1. Australian Geographical Society: Melbourne, 1952)
- The Australian Nature Trail (Georgian House: Melbourne, 1965)
- A Continent in Danger (Survival Books. A Survival Special. Andre Deutsch: London, 1966)
- Nature Walkabout (Reed: Artarmon, 1969)
- Southern Walkabout (Reed: Artarmon, 1969)
- Australia's National Parks (Angus & Robertson: Sydney, 1969)
- Around the Bush with Vincent Serventy (ABC: Sydney, 1970)
- Dryandra. The story of an Australian forest (Reed: Sydney, 1970)
- The Handbook of Australian Sea-birds (Reed: Sydney, 1971) (with Dominic Serventy and John Warham)
- Australia’s World Heritage Sites (1985)
- The Desert Sea. The Miracle of Lake Eyre in Flood (Macmillan Australia: Melbourne, 1985)
- Flight of the Shearwater (Kangaroo Press: Kenthurst, 1996)
- An Australian Life. Memoirs of a naturalist, conservationist, traveller and writer (Fremantle Arts Centre Press: South Fremantle, 1999)
