= Australasian Ornithological Conference =

Australasian Ornithological Conference is a biennial meeting of ornithologists that focuses on the Australasian region and Antarctica. Preceded by the short-lived series of two Southern Hemisphere Ornithological Congresses, they were initiated by the Royal Australasian Ornithologists Union (RAOU), also known as Birds Australia, with the inaugural meeting held at Bathurst, New South Wales in 2001. They have subsequently been jointly sponsored by the BirdLife Australia and the Ornithological Society of New Zealand (OSNZ).

== Conferences ==
- 2001 – Bathurst, New South Wales
- 2003 – Canberra, Australian Capital Territory
- 2005 – Blenheim, New Zealand
- 2007 – Perth, Western Australia
- 2009 – Armidale, New South Wales
- 2011 – Cairns, Queensland
- 2013 – Auckland, New Zealand
- 2015 – Adelaide, South Australia
- 2017 – Geelong, Victoria
- 2019 – Darwin, Northern Territory
- 2022 - Auckland, New Zealand (deferred from 2021 and online due to covid)
- 2023 - Brisbane, Queensland
- 2025 - Perth, Western Australia
