= Royal Australasian Ornithologists Union Fellows =

The Royal Australasian Ornithologists Union (RAOU) may elect somebody to the position of fellow, the highest grade of membership, for service to the RAOU and to ornithology. Fellows of the RAOU are entitled to use the letters FRAOU after their name. There is a limit to the number of fellows at any time and new fellows are generally only elected when one dies. In the following list those elected to the similar positions of corresponding member or corresponding fellow (CM) are included, although this does not appear to have occurred since the 1930s.

== Notable fellows ==
Some past and present fellows, following the years of their election, are:

- 1939 – Wilfred Backhouse Alexander (1885–1965)
- 1939 – Gregory Macalister Mathews CBE (1876–1949)
- 1939 – Ernst Walter Mayr (CM) (US) (1904–2005)
- 1939 – Frank Alexander Wetmore (CM) (US) (1886–1978)
- 1939 – Robert Cushman Murphy (CM) (US) (1887–1973)
- 1939 – Percy Roycroft Lowe (CM) (UK) (1870–1948)
- 1941 – Archibald George Campbell (1880–1954)
- 1941 – Alexander Hugh Chisholm OBE (1890–1977)
- 1949 – Sir Charles Frederic Belcher OBE (1876–1970)
- 1951 – Keith Alfred Hindwood (1904–1971)
- 1951 – Dominic Louis Serventy (1904–1988)
- 1958 – Alan John (Jock) Marshall (1911–1967)
- 1963 – Arnold Robert McGill OAM (1905–1988)
- 1965 – James Allen Keast (1922–2009)
- 1970 – Angus Hargreaves Robinson (1907–1973)
- 1970 – Wilson Roy Wheeler MBE (1905–1988)
- 1973 – Herbert Thomas Condon (1912–1978)
- 1973 – Sir Robert Falla CMG, KBE (1901–1979)
- 1974 – Sir Charles Alexander Fleming OBE, KBE (1916–1987)
- 1974 – Harold James Frith AO, FAA, FTSE (1921–1982)
- 1975 – Stephen Marchant AM (1912–1903)
- 1980 – Stephen John James Frank Davies (1935–2020)
- 1980 – Allan Reginald McEvey (1919–1996)
- 1981 – Pauline Reilly OAM (1918–2011)
- 1983 – Selwyn George (Bill) Lane (1922–2000)
- 1989 – Ian Cecil Robert Rowley (1926–2009)
- 1989 – Henry Norman Burgess Wettenhall AM (1915–2000)
- 1990 – Brian Douglas Bell (1930–2016)
- 1991 – Norman Chaffer OAM (1899–1992)
- 1992 – John Warham (1919–2010)
- 1993 – Margaret Alison Cameron AM (1937–2023)
- 1998 – Clive Dudley Thomas Minton AM (1934–2019)
- 2003 – Oliver Michael Griffiths Newman (1941-)
- 2004 – Stuart Leslie AM (-2005)
