= The Handbook of Australian Sea-birds =

1971 book by Dominic Serventy

- Author: D.L. Serventy, Vincent Serventy & John Warham
- Illustrator: John Warham and others
- Cover artist: John Warham
- Language: English
- Subject: Australian seabirds
- Genre: Zoology
- Publisher: A.H. & A.W. Reed: Sydney
- Publication date: 1971
- Publication place: Australia
- Media type: Print (hardcover) with dustjacket
- Pages: x + 254
- ISBN: 0-589-07079-7

The Handbook of Australian Sea-birds is a book published in 1971 by A.H. & A.W. Reed in Sydney. It was authored by Dominic Serventy, his brother Vincent Serventy, and John Warham. It is in octavo format (252 x 190 mm) and contains 264 pages bound in black buckram with a dustjacket illustrated with a photograph of a red-tailed tropicbird in flight. It contains numerous coloured and black-and-white photographs of seabirds, most of them taken by John Warham, as well as many sketches, maps and diagrams.

The stated aim of the authors is to enable seabirds found in Australian waters to be correctly identified and to record the known facts of their habits. Seabirds covered include the penguins, albatrosses and other petrels, tropicbirds, frigatebirds, gannets, cormorants, pelicans, skuas, gulls and terns, 104 species in all. With regard to the layout and content of the book the authors say:

”This book consists of two main parts. In the first we attempt a general account of Australia’s sea-bird fauna, its environment in the past and today, its distribution and the categories of birds found there. We also discuss some biological problems affecting those sea-birds, aspects of current research into their habits, and the problem of their conservation. The second part (Section V) of the book summarises what is known to date of the different species of birds in our region. Where there are adequate data each bird is described under the heads: Field Characteristics and General Habits; Status in Australia; Migration; Voice; Display; Breeding; Enemies and Mortality; Breeding Distribution.”
