= William David Lindsay Ride =

Australian zoologist

William David Lindsay Ride AM (8 May 1926 – 6 November 2011), usually credited as W. D. L. Ride, was an Australian vertebrate zoologist and paleontologist who was the chair of the committee that wrote updated editions of the International Code of Zoological Nomenclature.

== Career ==
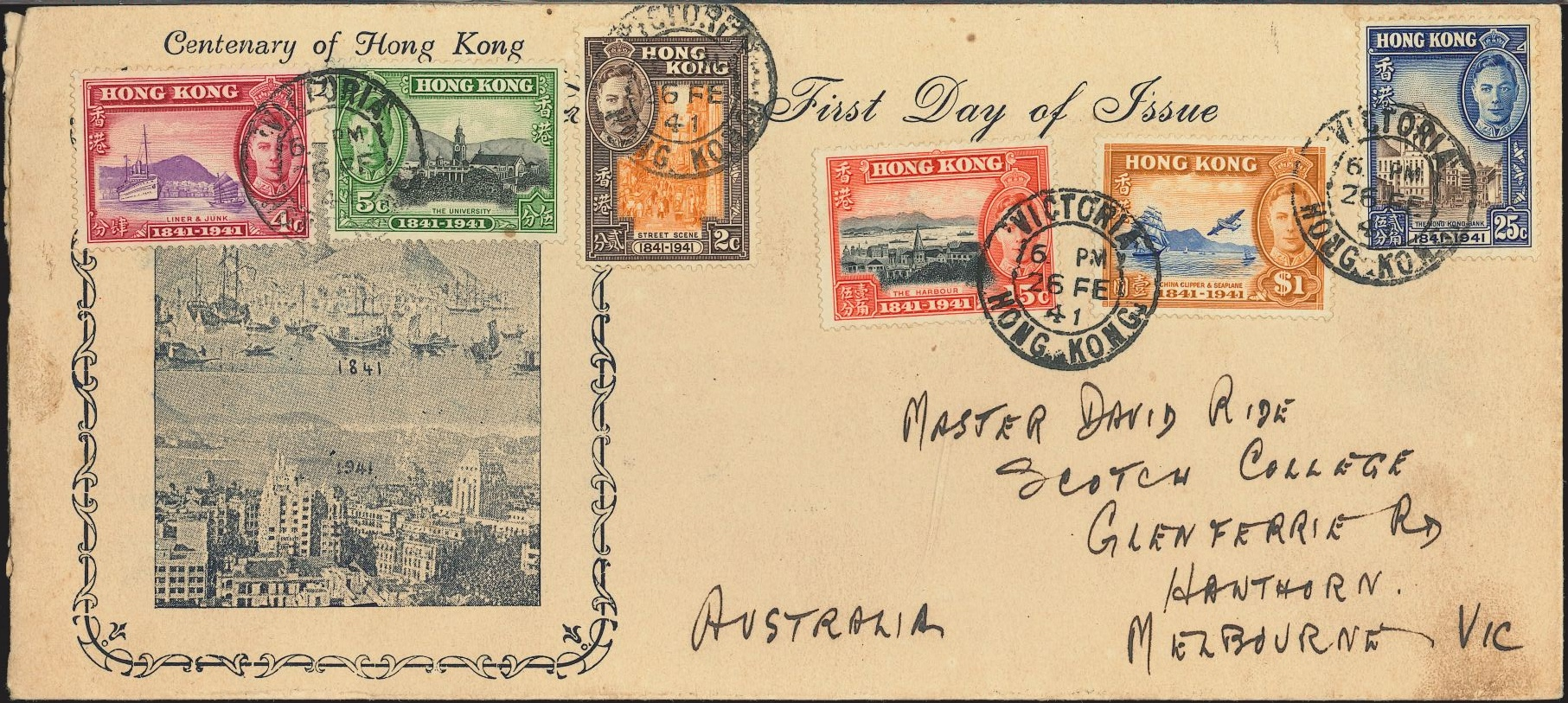
The first day cover (FDC) of 1841-1941 Centenary (26 Feb. 1941) Dr. L.T. Ride (Sir Lindsay Tasman Ride), father of William David Lindsay Ride, sent to David while he was attending Scotch College in Melbourne, Australia

Ride was born in London, England, in 1926, the eldest son of Sir Lindsay Tasman Ride. In 1957, he was appointed director of the Western Australian Museum in Perth, as well as a reader in zoology at the University of Western Australia. In 1975, he was appointed director of the Australian Biological Resources Study, located within the Commonwealth Scientific and Industrial Research Organisation (CSIRO), in Canberra.

Ride worked for the CSIRO from 1974 to 1980.He was also the head of the School of Applied Science at Canberra College of Advanced Education, 1982–87, and was appointed principal of the college in 1987. Following retirement in 198, he became a visiting fellow at the Australian National University until 2002.

In 1984, Ride was made a member of the Order of Australia.

He died in 2011 in Canberra, aged 85, survived by his wife Margaret and five children including the writer, curator and academic Peter Ride whose partner Ian Iqbal Rashid is a well known writer and filmmaker.

== Bibliography ==
David Ride produced a field guide to Australia's mammals in 1970, a subject that had not been addressed since the publication of the second edition of Furred Animals of Australia in 1944. Although Ride's guide only provided brief diagnostic accounts of mammalian fauna, the work was the only generally available book until the Australian Museum issued the standard text of Australian mammalogy for its series National Photographic Index of Australian Wildlife. As well as numerous papers in the scientific literature, books written or edited by Ride include:

- Ride, W.D.L. (1970). A guide to the native mammals of Australia. (Illustrated by Ella Fry). OUP: Melbourne. ISBN 0-19-550252-3
- Groves, R.H.; & Ride, W.D.L. (eds). (1982). Species at Risk: Research in Australia. (Proceedings of a Symposium on the Biology of Rare and Endangered Species in Australia, sponsored by the Australian Academy of Science and held in Canberra, 25 and 26 November 1981). Springer-Verlag.
- Ride, W.D.L.; & Younes, T. (eds). (1987). Biological Nomenclature Today. (IUBS Monograph Series No.2). OUP: USA. ISBN 1-85221-016-8
