= José Guillermo Hay =

Australian conservationalist

José Guillermo (J. G.) Hay was a nature conservationist in New South Wales and Western Australia. Hay owned and developed large landholdings around Lawson in the Blue Mountains during the 1880s and 1890s; a number of properties and features there are named in his honour.

== Biography ==
Hay came to Australia from California, and in 1879, purchased 121.4 hectares of land near the Blue Mountain railway station. He was appointed a trustee of the reserves in the Lawson area on behalf of the department in 1880. Hay developed real estate around Lawson, and lived in a landmark building known as "The Sanatorium" (later known as "The Palace") and was involved in various community improvement activities in the district.

In about 1899, he moved with his family to Western Australia, selling much of his Lawson properties.

In 1906, Hay presented a paper to the West Australian Natural History Society titled The visit of Charles Fraser (the Colonial Botanist of New South Wales) to the Swan River in 1827, with his opinion on the suitableness of the district for a settlement; together with copious notes by J. G. Hay; to which is added The Journal of H.M.S. Success, Captain James Stirling, on the above occasion.

Hay founded the Gould League of Bird Protection in Western Australia in about 1906 and was a natural environment campaigner, lobbying for the creation of Western Australia's first flora and fauna reserve at North Dandalup in 1910.
