= Frank Littler =

Australian ornithologist and entomologist

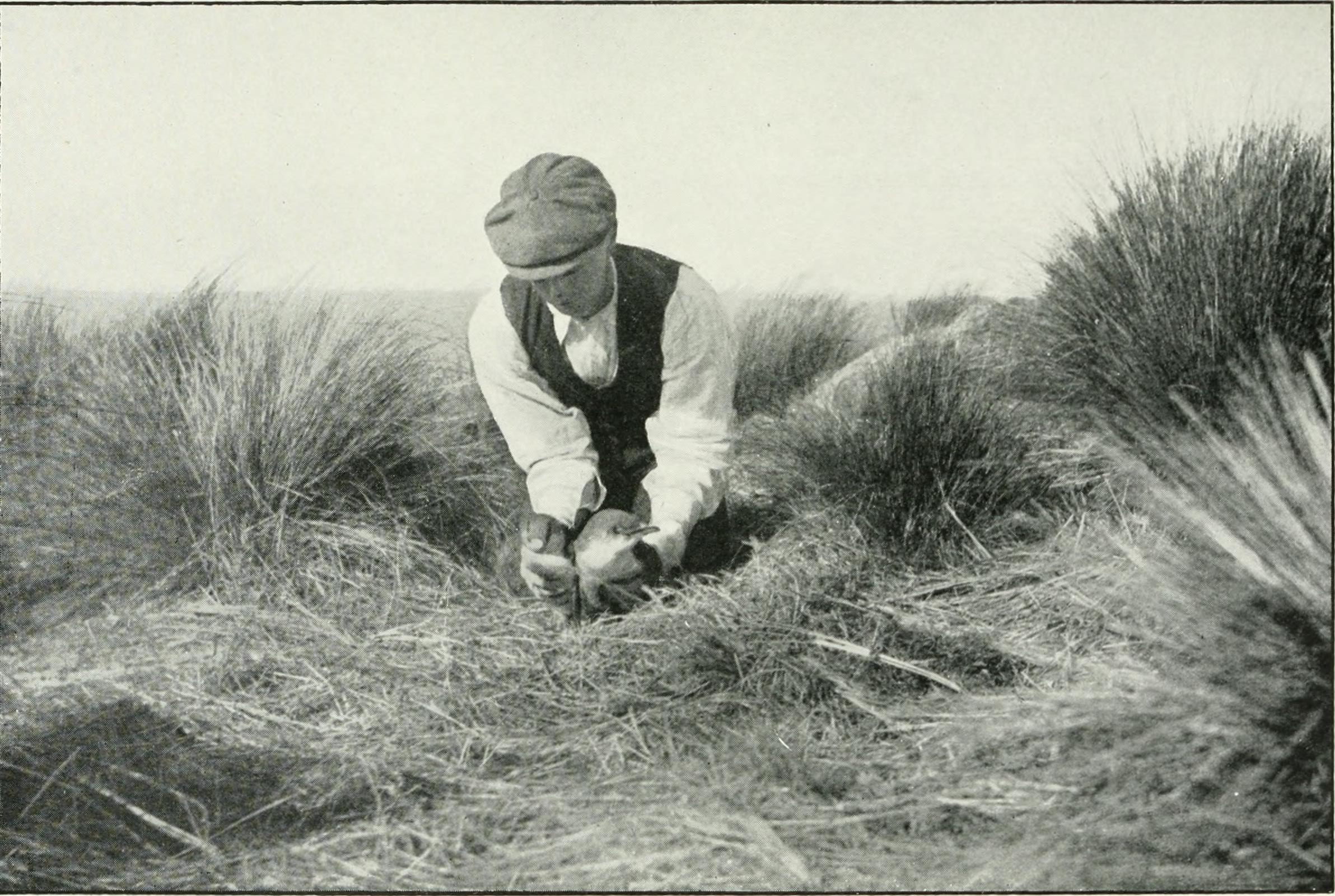
Frank Littler on the Ninth Island (A handbook of the birds of Tasmania and its dependencies (1910))

Frank Mervyn "F.M." Littler (1880–1922) was an Australian ornithologist and entomologist, born in Tasmania.

Littler wrote about twenty-five journal articles and regular newspaper columns on ornithology. His major work was published as Handbook of the Birds of Tasmania and its Dependencies in 1910. Littler is also noted as an entomologist and as a corresponding member of several American and English entomological societies, and published articles on that subject. His work on birds, however, is his best-known legacy to scientific literature.

Littler is thought to have made and traded in large collection of specimens, but the whereabouts of these is uncertain. He was a founder of the Royal Australasian Ornithologists Union.
