= The Finch Society of Australia =

Australian animal welfare organization

The Finch Society of Australia Inc. is an established organisation designed as a forum to connect "finch fanciers". The society is a part of the animal fancy movement, supporting and promoting animal welfare.

The Finch Society of Australia is more than 50 years old and has a number of branches and affiliate clubs, namely,

- Wollongong Finch Club
- Hawkesbury Finch Club
- Hunter Valley Finch Club
- Canberra Finch Club

Although these branches are situated in New South Wales and Australian Capital Territory, the society has members from all states of Australia.

== Publications ==
The Finch Society of Australia produces a publication called The Finch Breeders Review that is distributed to all members bi-monthly. The society produces an advertisement named 'Bird Trader' to assist members of the society in trading and selling their birds.

The Hunter club additionally produces a monthly publication called, The Finch Fancier while the Hawkesbury club similarly produces Finch Bizz.

== Incumbents ==
- President: Sam Davis
- Secretary: Brian Read
- Treasurer: Lyn Wright
- Vice-presidents: Jason Holmes, Ivan Cindric

== See also ==
Royal Australasian Ornithologists Union
