= Kate Buchanan =

Australian scientist and academic

Professor Katherine Louise Buchanan
- Education: University of Glasgow
- Known for: Research on developmental stress in songbirds
- Scientific career
- Fields: behavioural ecology, ornithology
- Thesis: Song and sexual selection in the sedge warbler (Acrocephalus schoenobaenus) (1997)
- Doctoral advisor: Clive Catchpole

Katherine Louise "Kate" Buchanan is an avian behavioural ecologist currently working in Deakin University's School of Life and Environment Sciences. Her research focuses on investigating how sexual selection has shaped the evolution of complex songs in birds and ultimately how this is reflected in the evolution of the brain itself.

== Education and appointments ==
Kate Buchanan gained a Bachelor of Science in Zoology from the University of Glasgow in 1989 and a Doctor of Philosophy from Royal Holloway, University of London in 1997, working with Professor Clive Catchpole. After studying for two postdoctoral degrees at the University of Stirling, she was awarded a Personal Research Fellowship from the Royal Commission for the Exhibition of 1851 at Cardiff University. She was a lecturer at Cardiff University from 2003 to early 2008.

In early 2008, Buchanan took a position at Deakin University, Australia, at the Geelong campus, where she works within the Centre for Integrative Ecology. She was awarded an Australian Research Council Future Fellowship in 2014. Buchanan is currently editor-in-chief of BirdLife Australia's scientific ornithology journal Emu.

== Scientific work ==
She is most well known for her work on early development in songbirds and the effects of early developmental stress on the song system and genetic and environmental control of sexual signals. However, she has interests in the interactions between early development and control of the stress related behaviour and physiology and whether immunocompetence can mediate the costs of sexual traits. Her work has demonstrated the effects of the exposure of wild birds to endocrine disrupters in terms of both behaviour and physiology.
