= Keith Alfred Hindwood =

Australian businessman and ornithologist

Keith Alfred Hindwood (1904–1971) was a Sydney-based Australian businessman and amateur ornithologist. He joined the Royal Australasian Ornithologists Union (RAOU) in 1924, served as President 1944–1946, and was elected a Fellow of the RAOU in 1951. He was the most prolific contributor to the RAOU journal, the Emu, with some 600 pages of contributions from his first major paper in 1926 to his death. He coauthored, with Arnold McGill, The Birds of Sydney (1958). In 1959 he was awarded the Australian Natural History Medallion.
