= Norman Wettenhall =

Australian paediatric endocrinologist, philanthropist and bibliophile (1915–2000)

Dr Henry Norman Burgess Wettenhall AM (1915–2000) was an Australian paediatric endocrinologist, philanthropist, bibliophile and amateur ornithologist. Wettenhall was born in London while his family were living there before returning to Australia, where they lived in Toorak, Victoria. He was educated at Glamorgan, The Geelong College and the University of Melbourne, where he graduated from medicine in 1940.

He was a member of the Royal Australasian Ornithologists Union (RAOU), President 1978–1983, and elected a Fellow of the RAOU in 1989. He was the principal fundraiser for the RAOU's Handbook of Australian, New Zealand and Antarctic Birds project. He was a Member of the Order of Australia.
