= Ellis Le Geyt Troughton =

Australian zoologist and mammalogist

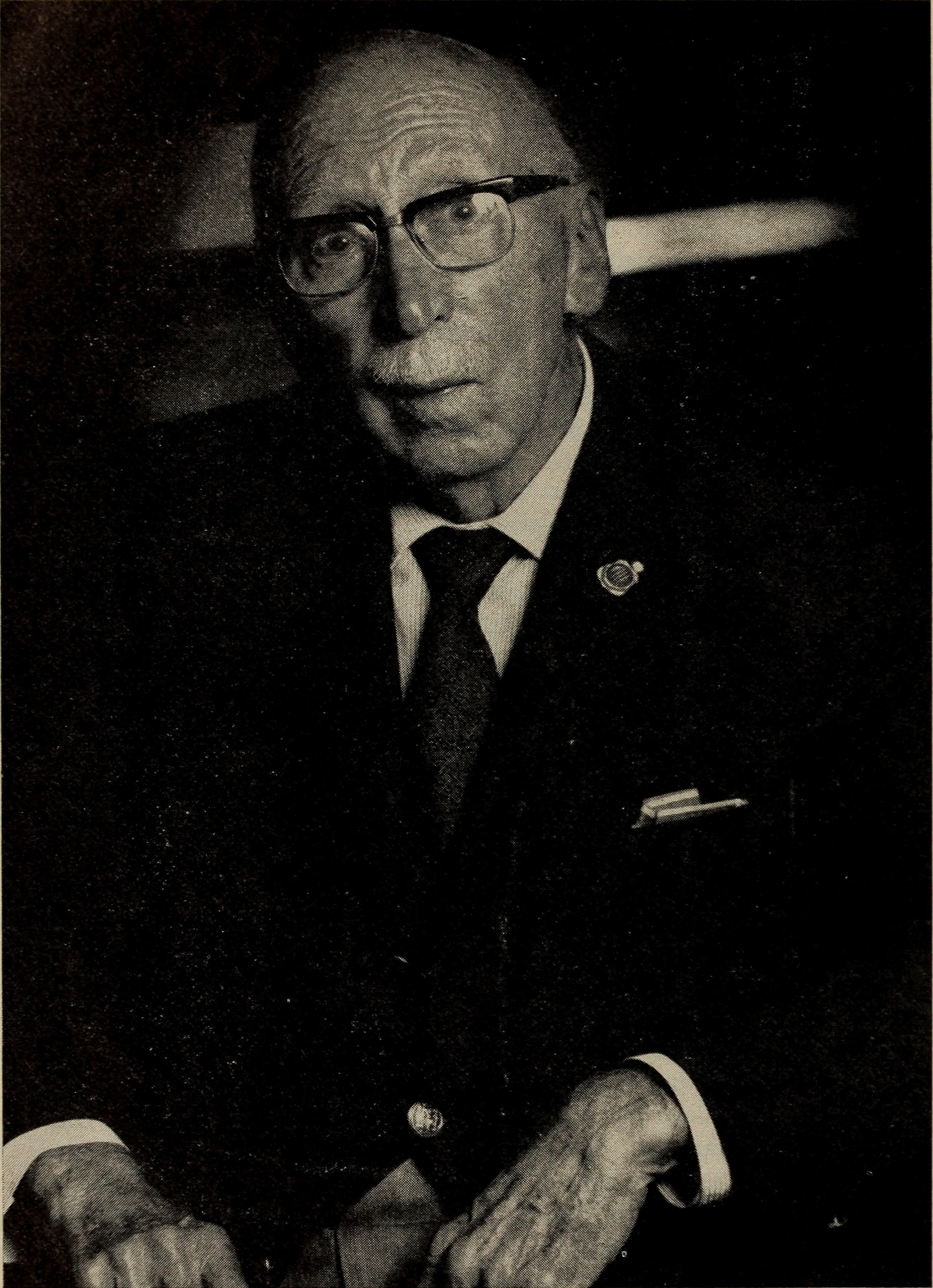

Ellis Le Geyt Troughton (born in Sydney on 29 April 1893; died 30 November 1974) was an Australian zoologist and mammalogist.

== Biography ==
Ellis Troughton began to exercise his interest in mammals at fourteen years of age, taking a role at the Australian Museum in 1908. He continued to be employed there as curator after returning from military service as a stretcher bearer in the European war during the years 1917 and 1918.

He retired from the museum in 1958.

== Works ==
Troughton wrote Furred Animals of Australia in 1941, with illustrations provided by Neville W. Cayley; the publication date of the work was determined to be 1944. He was the first Honorary Life Member of The "Australian Mammal Society" and The Ellis Troughton Memorial Award is named for him. Amongst Troughton early works is a significant contribution to the study of bats, and at 33 years of age he composed the text for the section regarding the poorly known Australian Chiroptera in the volume titled The Wild Animals of Australia; Troughton's text was one of the few original contributions to A. S. Le Souef and Henry Burrell's largely plagiarised work. Troughton classified the New Guinea singing dog as a separate species Canis hallstromi.
