= Science House =

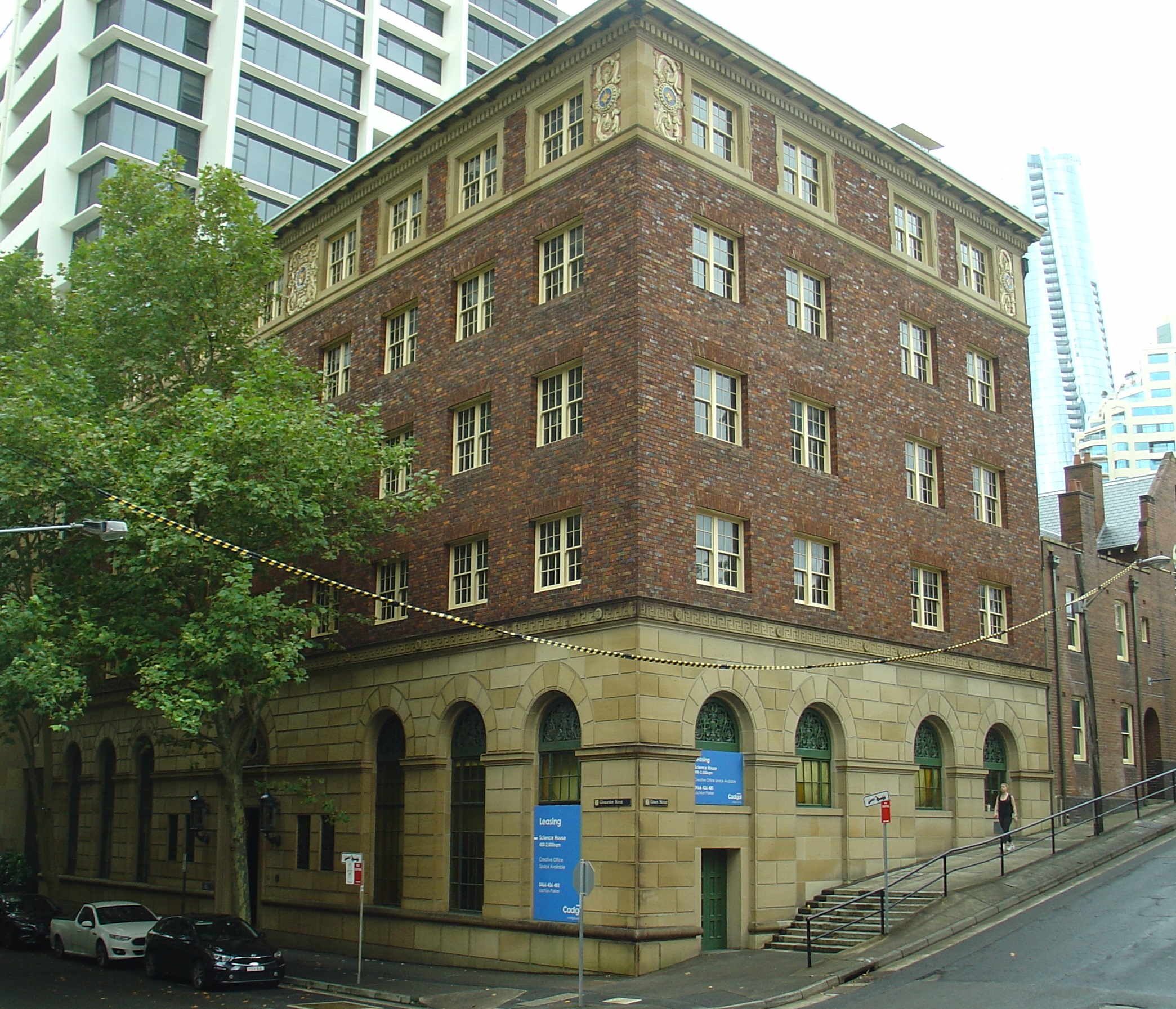

- Location within Sydney Location within Australia
- 33.8621°S 151.2062°E
- Location: 157–169 Gloucester Street and Essex Street, The Rocks, City of Sydney, New South Wales, Australia

History
- Built: 1930
- Built for: Three scientific societies

Site notes
- Architect: Peddle, Thorp and Walker
- Architectural style: Inter-war Commercial Palazzo
- Owner: Denwol Group

New South Wales Heritage Register
- Official name: Science House (aka Sports House, 1978–1991)
- Type: State heritage (built)
- Designated: 10 May 2002
- Reference no.: 1578
- Type: Scientific building
- Category: Scientific facilities
- Builders: John Grant and Sons, master builders

Science House is a heritage-listed commercial building located at 157–169 Gloucester Street and Essex Street, in the inner city Sydney suburb of The Rocks in the City of Sydney local government area of New South Wales, Australia. It was designed by Peddle Thorp & Walker Architects and built in 1930 by John Grant and Sons, Master Builders. It was also known as Sports House from 1978–1991. The building is owned by Denwol, a property group owned and controlled by Phillip Wolanski AM. It was added to the New South Wales State Heritage Register on 10 May 2002.

== History ==
Science House was opened on 7 May 1931 by the NSW Governor Air Vice-Marshal Sir Philip Game as a co-operative venture between three of the major scientific organisations in NSW. A venue to share facilities and operate from a centralised headquarters had been discussed since the 1870s and, in 1905, a committee was formed to that end but World War I and lack of finances forestalled the plan until the 1920s. After the Royal Victorian Institute of Architects and the Institution of Engineers built their Allied Societies Trust Building in Melbourne, The Royal Society of NSW, the Institution of Engineers, Australia, and the Linnaean Society of NSW decided to follow suit and formed a joint committee in 1926 to pursue the matter. When the site at the corner of Essex and Gloucester Streets was granted by the NSW Government in July 1927, an architectural competition was held by the Royal Australian Institute of Architects in 1928 with a first prize of £250. It was won by Peddle Thorp and Walker who designed an Inter-war Commercial Palazzo style building, one of the few in Sydney. The adjudicator's report on the entry said the design was:

'Remarkably in accord with the conditions, a special feature being its economy. The design shows cleverness, a thorough insight into the requirements of the promoters. The ground floor has been skilfully arranged to accommodate both lecture halls and, to meet the irregular angles in the boundaries of the site, the elevations are excellent and admirably suitable for the dignified purpose of the building.'

=== Construction ===
In June 1930 Governor Game laid the foundation stone and the building was completed in January 1931. It was constructed by John Grant & Sons who kept to the budget of £45,000 but allowed enough structural integrity in the building for additional storeys to be added in the future, and an additional lift to be installed. The first general meeting of the Royal Society of NSW was held in Science House on 6 May 1931. When the building was opened the three scientific bodies were joined by The Australian Chemical Institute, The Australian and New Zealand Association for the Advancement of Science, The Australian National Research Council, The Institute of Architects NSW, The Institution of Surveyors NSW and the Standards Association of Australia.

=== Sulman Medal ===
The Council of the Institute of Architects of NSW decided that the Sir John Sulman Medal (for 1932) should be for an institutional building and seven buildings were nominated. On 3 January 1933 it was announced that Peddle, Thorp and Walker had been awarded the inaugural Sulman Medal for the design of Science House.

=== 1940–2007 ===
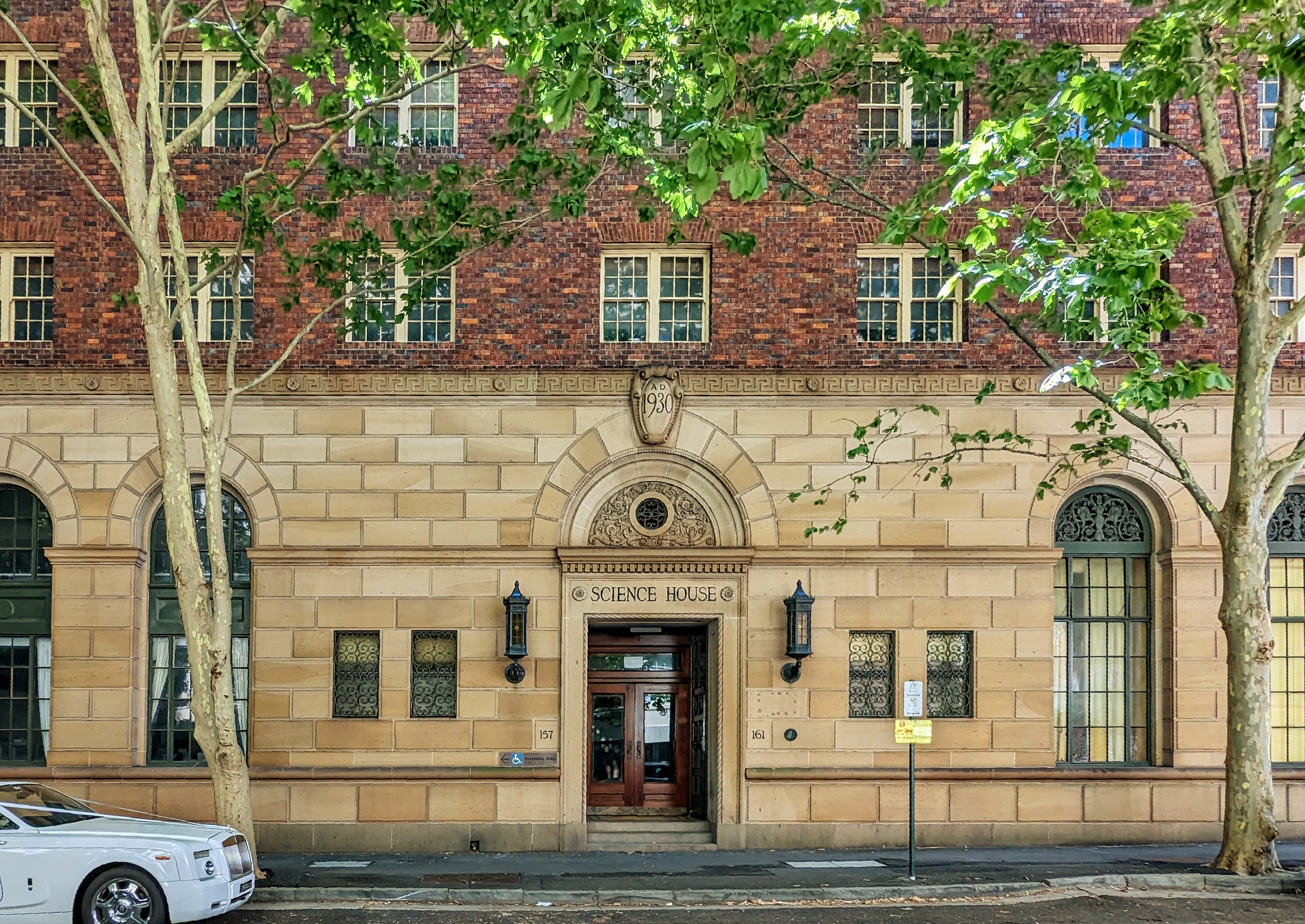
Science House front on Gloucester Street

During World War II an air raid shelter was constructed in a small hall on the ground floor. There were plans to extend the building an additional three storeys in 1953 but that did not eventuate. The building was occupied by the various scientific organisations from 1931 until 1976 and in 1978 the NSW Department of Sport and Recreation moved into the building which became known as "Sports House" until they left in 1991. During this time the large auditorium continued to be used for talks, and the building housed 11,000 books and journals and 1,000 films covering many areas of sport. The New South Wales Hall of Champions was installed in 1982, which included a Sports Museum to commemorate outstanding sportsmen and women of NSW. Major works were carried out on the building during 1995-96, after which the Australian Centre for Languages occupied the building, remaining there until 2007 following ACL's takeover by Navitas Limited in 2007.

=== New York University campus ===
In 2012, New York University established a campus in Sydney, leasing the ground floor of Science House and the three floors directly above. In December 2021, this campus was closed and relocated at the University of Sydney.

==== Mainway Management ====
In 2022, Mainway Management relocated to Science House as head office for its Development and Project Management consultancy services.

=== Sale to developer ===
In 2016 it was announced that the NSW Government would sell more than $100 million worth of commercial property in The Rocks in order to preserve and enhance the historic area and Science House was included. In August 2019, a 99-year leasehold was offered and a sale was announced in January 2020, the new owner being the Sydney-based Denwol group.

== Description ==
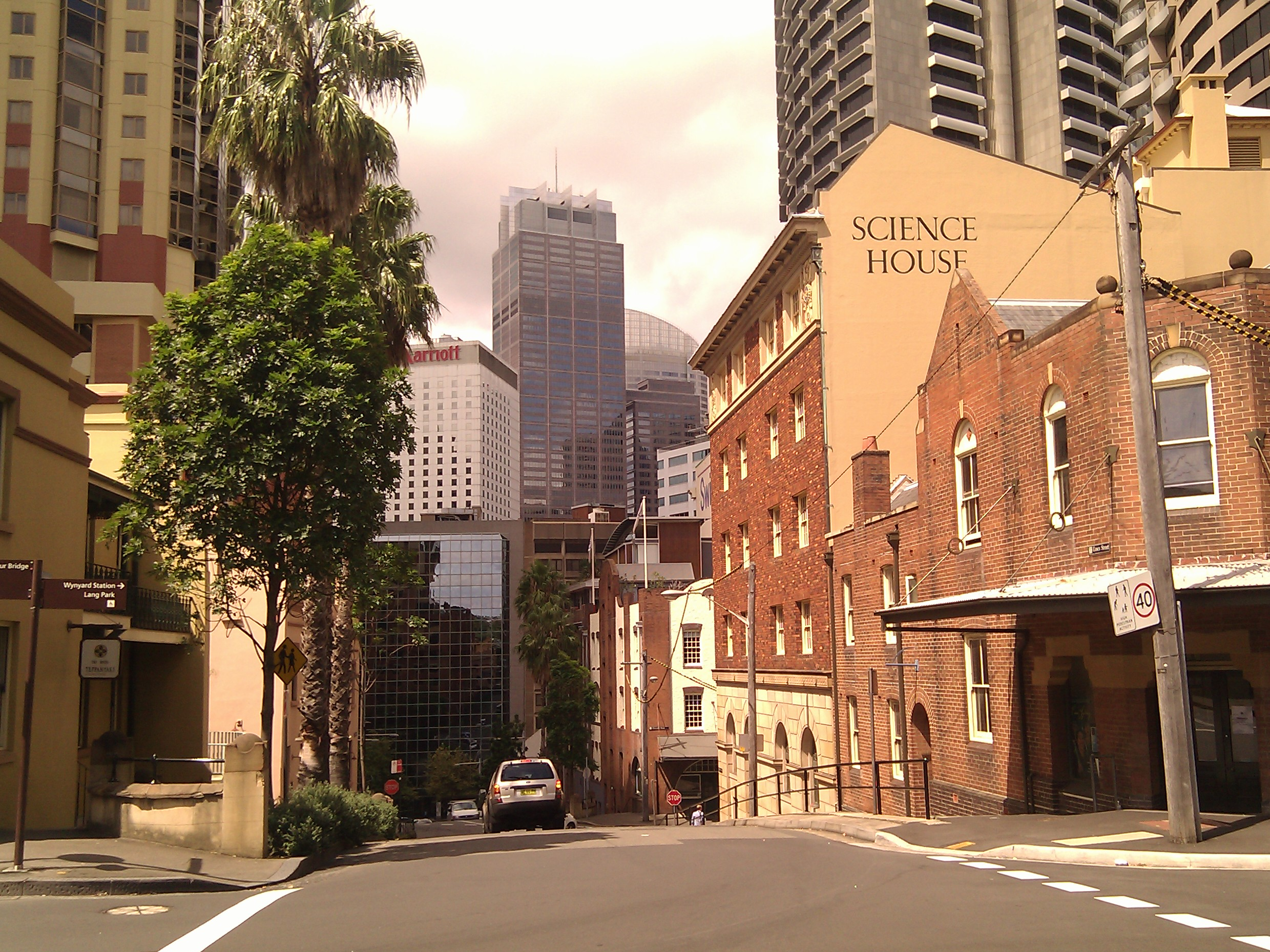
Rear of Science House, looking down Essex Street in 2012.

Science House sits on the south-western corner of the intersection of Gloucester and Essex Streets at Church Hill, Sydney. The structure of the six-storey building consists of a concrete-encased steel frame of columns and reinforced concrete slabs. The external masonry walls of the building are non-loadbearing and merely support their own weight. The designs of the principal facades in Gloucester and Essex Streets are divided into three architectural zones mirroring the exaggerated ground floor, piano nobile and attic storey of the Florentine Early Renaissance palazzo type. The exaggerated "ground storey" comprises the Ground Floor and Floor 1; the piano nobile Floors 2, 3 and 4, the attic storey Floor 5. The exaggerated "ground storey" is built of fine quality ashlar sandstone masonry with rusticated joints. In Gloucester Street, the windows have semi-circular heads rising through two storeys. A decorative metal grille fills the semi-circular arches; below the windows have steel frames. The piano nobile is stretched through three floors and has the most simple architectural treatment. The walls are built of textured brick of subtle colour variations. The window apertures are regularly spaced in nine bays along Gloucester Street, four bays in Essex Street. Each window aperture consists of a pair of identical double-hung timber sash-windows, each sash of six panels in the general design and portion of the Georgian style windows. The attic storey is more highly decorated. At window-sill level, a projecting square-profile string course runs along the Gloucester and Essex Street facades.

The internal walls are largely undecorated and finished with painted plaster over brickwork. Flooring is original timber, roofing is of terracotta pan tiles and ceilings are of moulded plasterwork. There are fire stairs in the south-western corner of the building, an original lift on the southern side and two lifts opposite the entrance doors.

The building's State Heritage listing includes significant original interiors and items of moveable heritage stored in separate locations.

=== Condition ===
The physical condition of the building is good, remediation work having been undertaken in 1995-96. As of March 2022, the new owner, Denwol Group, has undertaken that the whole building will be "refurbished to high quality heritage standard".

=== Modifications ===
- 1942 – Air raid shelter constructed in small hall on ground floor.
- 1948 – Upgrading of lighting in main auditorium.
- 1953 – Peddle Thorp & Walker prepare a design for a three-storey addition to Science House (which was never executed)
- 1972 – The SCRA gives approval for the enlargement of a roof-mounted advertising sign.
- 1983 – Recommendation by the SCRA that Science House be extended so that the new additions complement the original design.
- 1983 – Original passenger lift decommissioned and new lift installed in adjacent lift shaft. Fire isolation wall erected between lift shafts.
- 1995–96 – Major building project included new electrical, fire and airconditioning services, the construction of a second fire-isolated staircase and escape tunnel, a new second lift car and machinery and the recommissioning of the original lift car which remained unused since the 1980s. The original interiors and exteriors were conserved or restored including the replacement of some of the original terracotta roof tiles, external stone and brickwork, the internal partitions, corridors, main reception rooms and auditorium. New light fittings similar to the original were manufactured and original fittings were repaired and upgraded. New corridor paving was installed and the main stair and corridors reinstated.

== Heritage listing ==
Science House and site are of State Heritage significance for their historical and scientific cultural values, including their contribution to The Rocks area. The building was listed on the New South Wales State Heritage Register on 10 May 2002. Its notability derives from its aesthetic, associational and social significance as a building of exemplary architectural design for its period. Throughout several changes of changes of use and occupancy, the building retained physical evidence of its scientific heritage.

Science House, although not a unique example of the Inter-war period Commercial Palazzo style, is an extremely refined version employing classical details with a Georgian flavour, which is uncommon and rivalled by one other example in Sydney's central business district, Beneficial House on George Street.

== See also ==
- Australian non-residential architectural styles
- Sir John Sulman Medal
