= Furred Animals of Australia =

1931 book

- Author: Ellis Le Geyt Troughton
- Illustrator: Neville W. Cayley
- Language: English
- Subject: Australian mammals
- Genre: Reference
- Publication date: 1931
- Publication place: Australia

Furred Animals of Australia is a general reference book, first published in 1931, that gives accounts of Australian mammals, the continent's often unique marsupial and placental mammal fauna. The text and research for the book was undertaken by the mammalogist and museum curator Ellis Le Geyt Troughton. Colour plates for the work were produced by Neville W. Cayley, whose popular standard guide What Bird is That? inspired Troughton's working title What Mammal is That?. The second edition of the work, while dated 1943 on the title page, was issued by Angus and Robertson in 1944. It remained the only authoritative treatment of the continent's mammals to be readily available during the mid-twentieth century.

Preparation for the work was prompted by the absence of any general reference for Australian mammalogy, with no work being readily accessible or current. The book was an attempt to reproduce the highly regarded volumes of John Gould's The Mammals of Australia, issued in 1863 with lithographic illustrations by Henry Richter, a work only available as a valuable collectible. Two earlier twentieth century works on Australian animals had included sections on mammals, but most text for the entries was copied from the authoritative but outdated catalogue of mammal specimens at the British Museum of Natural History published by Oldfield Thomas in 1888. The otherwise plagiarised text did, however, include new accounts of Australian bats by the author of this work. Troughton's treatments of Australian mammals was not succeeded until 1983, excepting the brief diagnostic descriptions of W. D. L. Ride's 1970 field guide, when the Australian Museum issued the standard text of Australian mammalogy for their series National Photographic Index of Australian Wildlife.

Ellis Troughton's second edition was dated as 1943, but an investigation of the publisher's correspondence in 1984 determined that the work was not available until 1944. The book contained the first publication of new genera of bats. the result of Troughton's research into the regions very poorly known chiropteran species, and the date of publication was subject to taxonomic rules of priority. Troughton's new taxa were often reduced to synonyms, and had been regarded as too exuberant in nominating new species and genera, but some of the names have been resurrected when later revisions revealed hidden species. Ronald Strahan summarised his separation of populations as correct in the judgement of later workers, but for the wrong reasons.

The mammalogist Ronald Strahan, who edited the Australian Museum's complete book of mammals, also reissued this work as What Mammal is That? in 1987. Strahan provided brief accounts to Cayley's plates, supplemented with the illustrations of Peter Schouten, he says to emulate the work What Bird is That?. Strahan assembled the new work to showcase the art of Cayley's mammals that had been collected by researchers seeking reference material the Australian Museum's book. He explains that the new work resembles the original in name only, with his text replacing Troughton's and including illustrations by Cayley not appearing in the original and newly commissioned art to supplement the work with new species. When introducing Cayley's paintings in the new edition, Strahan criticises his renditions of mammals (and the birds of his earlier works) as somewhat flat and lifeless when compared to Richter's lithographs in Gould's 1863 volumes.
