= Neville William Cayley =

Australian author, artist and ornithologist

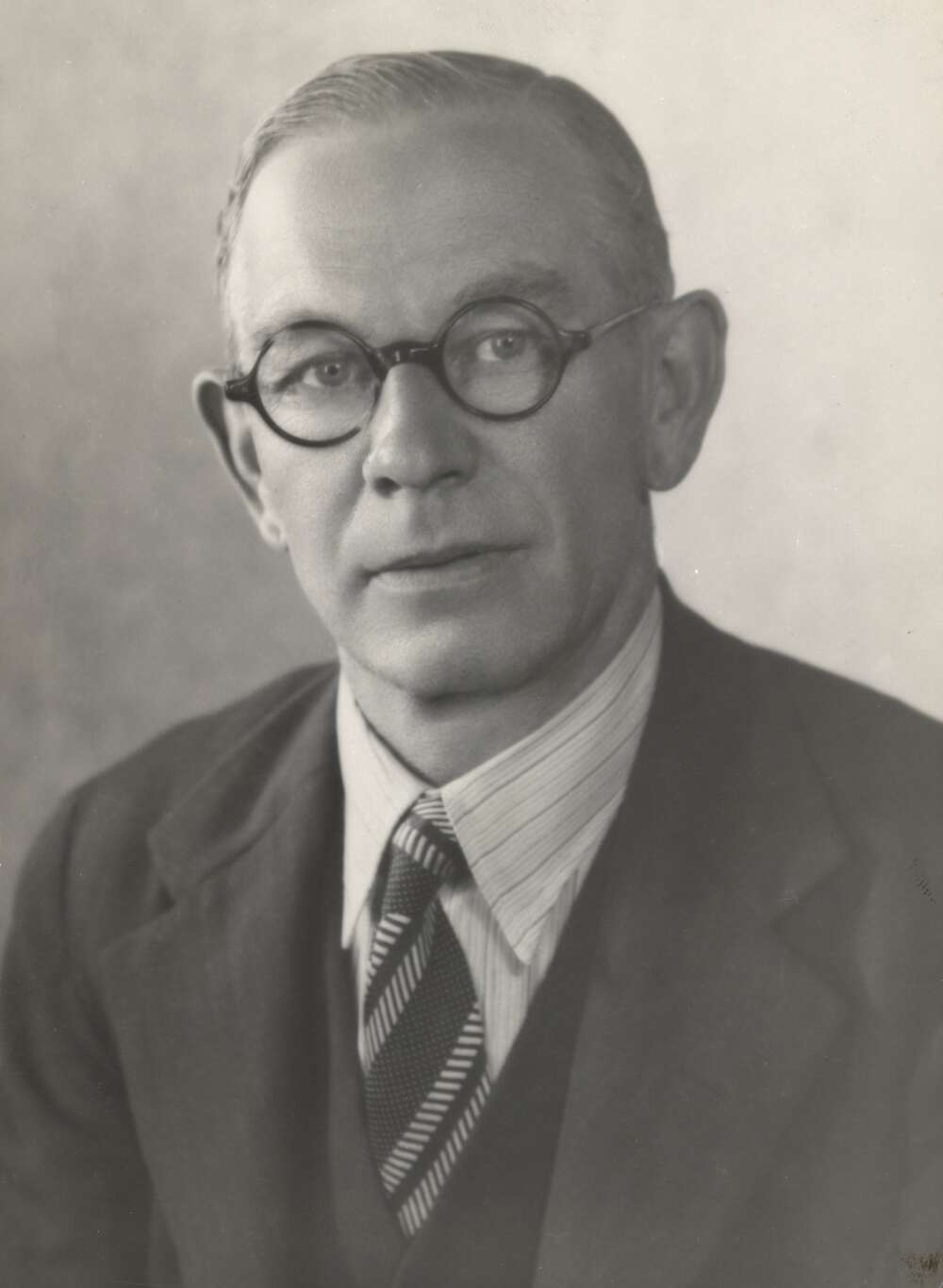
Neville W. Cayley c. 1936

Neville William Cayley (1886–1950) was an Australian writer, artist and ornithologist. He produced Australia's first comprehensive bird field guide What Bird is That?. In 1960 it was rated the all-time best seller in Australian natural history and remains a classic birding reference to this day.

== Early years ==
Born in Yamba, New South Wales, in January 1886, he was the son of ornithologist and bird artist Neville Henry Cayley born Caley, and consequently signed his name as Neville W. Cayley in his professional years. Cayley's family moved to Sydney in the mid-1890s, where he studied art and was a pivotal member in the Cronulla Surf Life Saving Club.

In 1918, his first work, the booklet Our Birds was published. Our Flowers and The Tale of Bluey Wren followed, both published in 1926. In the same period (1925–26), Cayley began illustrating birds’ eggs for the Australian Encyclopaedia.

== Groundbreaking work ==
Cayley's big breakthrough came in 1931 when he published his most celebrated work: What Bird is That? It was the first comprehensive field guide to Australian birds and included full-colour paintings of each species, setting the benchmark for all Australian field guides to come. It remained the only available field guide from the 1930s (the first edition was issued in 1931) to the 1960s. Rather than create another book for birding's elite, Cayley wanted to create one that was accessible to beginners. To this end, he organised the birds by habitat, which made them easy to find and identify, and included concise information on bird distribution, behaviour and breeding. The book became a classic, has been reprinted and repackaged in many formats, and remains in print to this day.

Following the success of What Bird is That? Cayley published a number of other bird titles as well as paintings for What Butterfly is That? (1932) and Furred Animals of Australia (1941). Cayley favoured watercolours and his vibrant pictures were steeped in sunlight and shadow. He often used bird specimens from the Australian Museum as reference, and noted on the back of artwork which particular specimen he had used. His paintings were regularly published in the Royal Australasian Ornithologists’ Union's quarterly journal The Emu, and he wrote popular articles on birds for the weekly Sydney Mail. Cayley held several art exhibitions and in 1932 one of his paintings was presented to King George V.

== Cayley's 'big bird book' ==
Meanwhile, the prolific Cayley was working on a much more ambitious project – his "big bird book". From about 1918 until the time of his death in 1950, Cayley was painting subspecies, plumage stages and eggs (now lost) for the entire range of known Australian birds. The project was incomplete at the time of his death, despite the illustrations being all but finished. In 1984, noted ornithologist Terence Lindsey picked up where Cayley had left off, incorporating these illustrations into a revised and expanded edition of What Bird is That? For seasoned and emerging bird lovers alike, Cayley's "big bird book" was finally published.

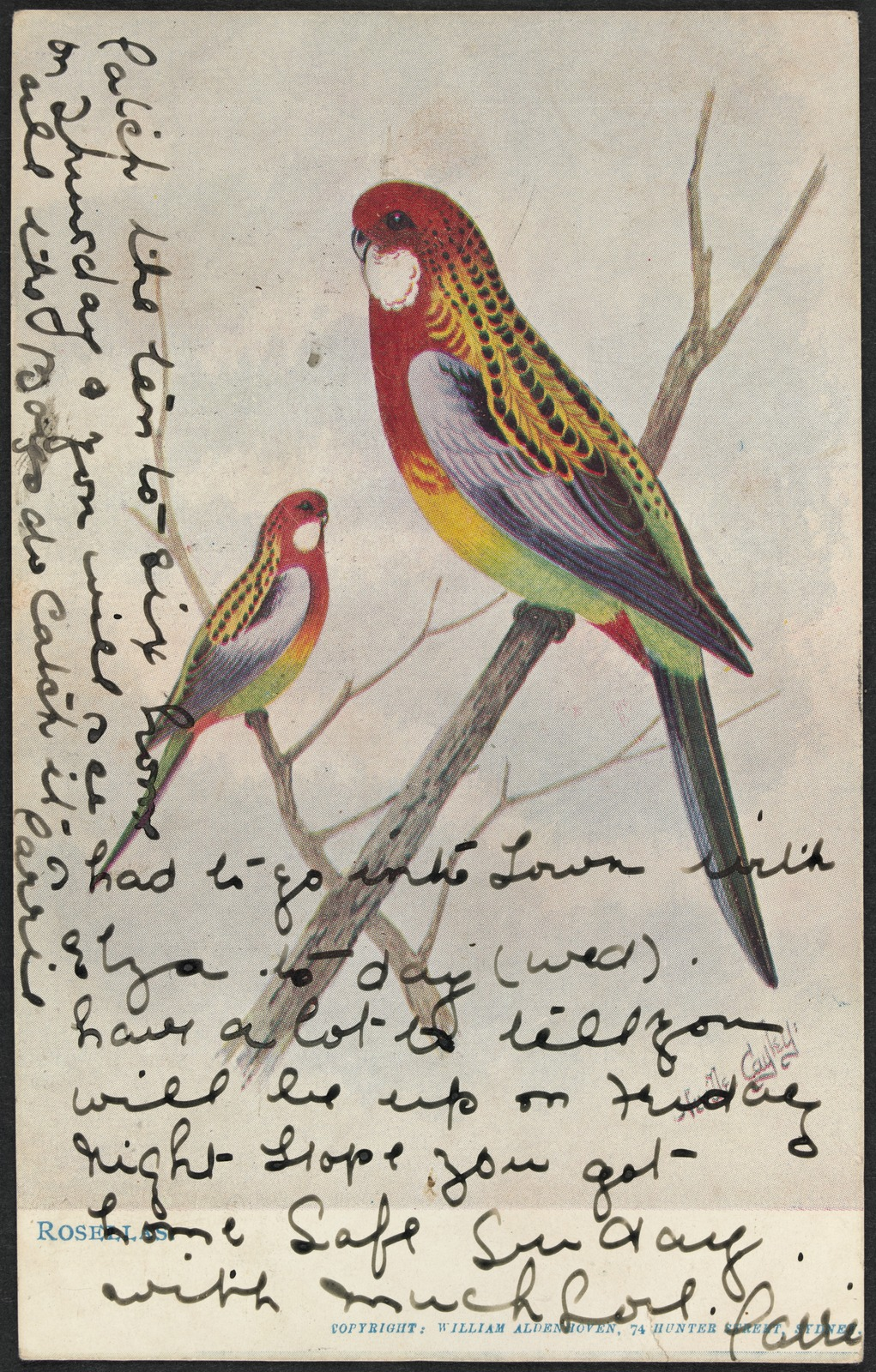
Postcard from artwork by Neville W. Cayley, c. 1903

== Beyond publishing ==
As well as an author and artist, Cayley was a prominent ornithologist. A Fellow of the Royal Zoological Society of New South Wales, he was elected President in 1932–1933. He was also President of the Royal Australasian Ornithologist's Union in 1936–1937. He was a Trustee of the Royal National Park from 1937–1948 and was instrumental in establishing the zoological cabin there. Cayley was long associated with the Gould League of Bird Lovers of New South Wales and was made an Honorary Life Member in 1935. The League published a large number of his paintings and his birds were reproduced on more than two million membership cards. Cayley truly believed in the value of ornithology and in memory of his father, he created a scholarship in Economic Ornithology at Sydney University, to be administered by the League and funded by royalties from What Bird is That? The scholarship was eventually extended to post-graduate students involved in wildlife study or management relating to birds from universities around Australia. It endured for around 50 years, with the final two 'Gould League of NSW Cayley Memorial Scholarships' awarded in 2010.

Cayley was active in other community pursuits, including being a founding member of the Cronulla Surf Life Saving Club and a member of the executive of the Surf Life Saving Association of Australia and the Royal Life Saving Society.

== Final years ==
Cayley married twice and had two sons from his first marriage. He continued to work until around 1947, by which time he suffered from chronic kidney disease and, following a series of strokes, was no longer able to paint. He died on 17 March 1950 at his home in the Sydney seaside suburb of Avalon, aged 64.
