= Gould League =

Australian not-for-profit organisation

The Gould League is an Australian independent not-for-profit organisation promoting environmental education, founded in Victoria in 1909 and named after the English ornithologist John Gould. Largely autonomous branches were subsequently established in other Australian states.

== History ==
The initial stimulus to form the Gould League was a letter from Jessie McMichael to John Albert Leach, supervisor of nature study in Victorian state schools and later Assistant Chief Inspector of Schools in Victoria. A full history can be found at https://gould.org.au/wp-content/uploads/2025/10/GL-History-of-Enviromental-Education-as-at-1Nov2025.pdf

=== 1900s ===
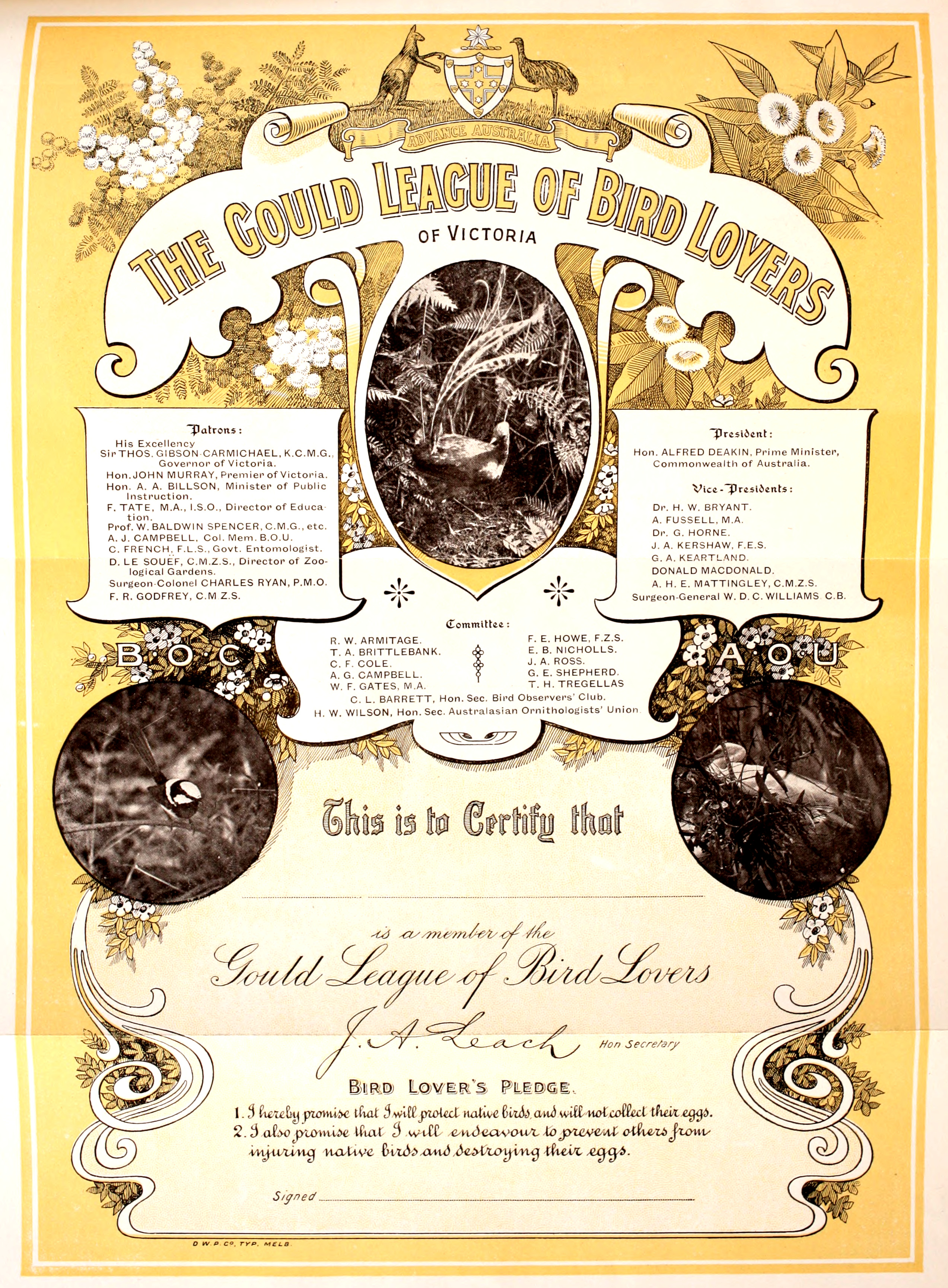
A Gould League certificate with a 'bird lovers pledge' issued in The Emu, 1910

When formally established in 1909, the Gould League of Bird Lovers, as it was then called, was devoted to bird protection, especially the prevention of bird egg theft, the promotion of interest in and knowledge of birds and to campaign for the formation of bird sanctuaries. Members would take a pledge to protect Australian birdlife and not to collect their eggs.

One of the main sponsors was the Royal Australasian Ornithologists Union. Alfred Deakin was the first Gould League president. The League had considerable success during this period, particularly in education. Activities included field days for the public to be introduced to birdlife, and publishing educational material.

=== 1960s ===
After the 1960s the League focused on more general environmental education, and the name "Gould League" was adopted, without specific reference to birds. The Gould Leagues promoted the teaching of Environmental Education in schools, publishing classroom material and establishing field studies centres.

=== 1990s ===
During the 1990s there was a shift of emphasis to "Education for Sustainability". For example, the 1990 formation of the first Recycling Education Centre in Australia by the Gould League of Victoria and the Waste Wise Schools program significantly reduced the waste to landfill produced by schools.

=== 2000s ===
The Gould League located in Moorabbin, Victoria changed its name from Gould League to Gould Group Ltd. in 2006.

In August 2008, Gould Group went into voluntary administration. This was attributed to many factors, primarily being a sudden halt in government funding. The loss of hundreds of thousands of dollars of funding from Sustainability Victoria caused major problems.

In good news though, administrators found a funder for the ailing organisation, with a NSW land care group, Liverpool Plains Land Management Committee, taking over its running and reviewing the Gould League's operations in a bid to have it continue into the future. Programs were reduced but not halted with funds repaid to Liverpool Plans after a bequest was received by the League.

2009 was the 100th anniversary of the organisation.

=== 2010s ===
School excursions at Gould League's Recycling/Sustainability Education Centre in Moorabbin, Ricketts Point Marine Sanctuary in Beaumaris and outreach in Melbourne Metro schools were returned to full strength in 2010 and have been running ever since. These popular programs cover the important sustainability themes of waste minimisation (recycling and composting), biodiversity, marine ecology and water conservation. Bookings for programs can be made online or by phoning the Gould League office.

Gould League publications are available via an online bookstore, and hundreds of Australian's renew their annual membership to the organisation. Membership badges have become collector's items. The 2012 badge featured the brolga, to acknowledge the relationship with NSW Liverpool Plains Land Management Committee.

In October 2012, Gould League initiated Toolangi State Forest excursions, with the endorsement of the Department of Sustainability and Environment after the closure of the Toolangi Forest Discovery Centre and Education Programs mid-2012.

In mid-2016, Gould League's Genoa St Sustainability Education Centre was closed due to the deterioration of the building. Operations moved to a new site at Le Page Primary School in Cheltenham.

=== Gould League Publications ===
In the late 1920s Neville Cayley, a member of the Council for some years, was occupied in writing and illustrating a comprehensive guide to Australian birds. In return for the Council’s sponsorship he assigned four tenths of his 10% royalty to the League. In 1931 at the 21st Bird Day celebration in the Assembly Hall, What Bird Is That? was launched. Despite early doubts, What Bird? was a huge success. In 1960 it was rated the all-time best seller in Australian natural history books, and is still in print today.

Initial sales were disappointing, and in February 1935 Cayley, perennially short of cash, offered to sell his remaining royalty share to the League for £300. With considerable misgivings, Council agreed. Sales took off during World War II, sparked interest from US servicemen in Australia, and the book turned out to be a lucrative investment.

It was not until 1934 that the League undertook a publication of its own with the production of Gould League Songs and Poems. This took the form of an 80-page booklet: the main section of 14 pages featured 16 songs, the words mainly written about Australian birds and set to the music of well-known British folk songs. Twenty five pages of bird poems followed, and the rest was given over to articles about birds and Gould League matters.

The book is plentifully illustrated with photographs and two colour plates of paintings by Neville W. Cayley (fantails and whistlers). Songs & Poems was reprinted in 1965, but on inferior paper and without the colour plates.

In June 1935 the Council agreed to another publication, called Feathered Friends. It consisted of "a Foreword by The President, Mr. Ross Thomas; a preface by Mr. W. Fingigan, and an introductory article on Australian birds in general by Mr. A. Chisholm. Then followed six articles: The Lyrebird by Mr. M. Sharland; The Satinbird by Mr N. Chaffer; The Blue Wren’s by Mr. Cayley; The White-eared Honeyeater by Mr K. Hindwood; The Magpie by Mr. D. Leithhead and The Heath Wren by Mr. Chisholm."

Feathered Friends was illustrated with numerous photographs and full-page colour plates of the six birds, painted by Neville Cayley. The originals are now in the National Library in Canberra. The book was published by Angus and Robertson in September 1935, and copies given to every public school in NSW.

In the same year, 1935, the League commenced publication of Gould League Notes, a magazine that appeared annually until 1967, following the general pattern set by the earlier Supplements to the Gazette. A copy was sent to every public school in Victoria, as well as every private school with a Gould League branch. The first issue ran to 24 pages, the next three to 40, and from 1939 there were always more than 50.

From the beginning the pages were brightened by a coloured plate, supplied (with descriptive notes) by Neville Cayley for many years, and then by a succession of distinguished artists. Starting with 1938, League Notes featured extensive accounts of the most recent Bird Camp.

== See also ==
- Conservation biology
- Conservation movement
- Environmental protection
- Habitat conservation
- José Guillermo Hay
- The Birds of Australia
