= Norman Wettenhall Foundation =

The Norman Wettenhall Foundation (now the Wettenhall Environment Trust) is an Australian environmental philanthropic foundation and a charitable trust with tax-deductible status. It supports projects that enhance or maintain the vitality and diversity of the Australian natural living environment, with an emphasis on conserving Australia's native birds and their habitats.

It was founded in 1997 on the proceeds of the sale of the book collection of Henry Norman Burgess Wettenhall, a paediatrician, art-lover, amateur ornithologist, environmentalist and philanthropist.
