= Gerard Frederick van Tets =

Ornithologist and palaeontologist

Jonkheer Gerard Frederick van Tets (19 January 1929 – 14 January 1995), otherwise known as Jerry van Tets, was a twentieth century British, Canadian and Australian ornithologist and palaeontologist. Born to Dutch parents, jhr. Hendrik Barthout van Tets, heer van Goidschalxoord and Thérèse van Heukelom, in London on 19 January 1929, Van Tets spent his childhood in the Netherlands. Following World War II, he moved to England to complete his schooling at Hazelmere. He completed two years of national service with the Royal Engineers in England and Austria before emigrating to Canada where he studied at the University of Toronto (1952–54) and the University of British Columbia (1954-1963), obtaining his PhD in 1963. He became a member of the American Ornithologists' Union in 1958. In November 1963, he married Patricia Anne Johnston in Vancouver, British Columbia, moving shortly thereafter to Australia, where he joined the Commonwealth Scientific and Industrial Research Organisation in the Division of Wildlife and Ecology, now the Division of Sustainable Ecosystems.

Van Tets participated in the 1972–1973 Auckland Islands Expedition where he studied the Auckland Islands shag on the Auckland Islands.

Van Tets swam for the swimming teams of British Troops Austria, the University of Toronto and the University of British Columbia.

Van Tets received recognition for his studies on bird strike damage to aircraft, and later for his studies of the bird bones in the Australian National Wildlife Collection, including those of the extinct Tasman booby which he described scientifically in 1988, and became a specialist authority on the mutton bird and the cormorant family. Together with Michael Crowley, Chris Davey, Peter Fullagar, Ederic Slater, Petrus Heyligers and others, Van Tets helped to establish and maintain a long term ecological study on Montague Island, NSW. Van Tets served as compiler for the first four bird (Aves) volumes of the Zoological Catalogue of Australia and as a sub-editor for behaviour for the first three volumes of the Handbook of Australian, New Zealand and Antarctic Birds.

On retirement in 1988, Van Tets continued to work as a research fellow and as curator of osteology for the Australian National Wildlife Collection and the Faunal Reference Collection of the Prehistory Department of the Australian National University. He died in Canberra, Australia on 14 January 1995. Van Tets was survived by his wife and three children, Janet Bradly, Ian van Tets and Kit Cassidy.

The extinct New Zealand stiff-tailed duck, Oxyura vantetsi, was named in his honour.

The Gerard Frederick van Tets Field Research Station on Montague Island, NSW was named in recognition of Jerry's work there.

== Selected publications ==
- Tets, G F van, 1994. Do Cormorants eat Freshwater Mussels? If not, What Does? Emu 94, 127-8
- Fullager, P J, Davey C C, Tets, G F van, and Heyligers P C., 1990. Is the Short-Tailed Shearwater Colonizing New South Wales? A Long-Term Study on Montagu Island. Nature in Eurobodalla, 5, 51-6.
- Tets, G F van, Rich, P V, and Marino-Hadi-Wardoyo H., 1989. A Reappraisal of Protoplotus beauforti from the Early Tertiary of Sumatra and the Basis of a New Pelecaniform Family. Geological Research and Development Centre. Paleontology Series 5, 57-75.
- Tets, G F van, Meredith, C W., Fullagar, P J and Davidson, P M., 1988. Osteological differences between Sula and Morus, and a description of an extinct new species of Sula from Lord Howe and Norfolk Islands, Tasman Sea. Notornis, 35, pp 35–57.
- Rich, P V, Tets, G F van, and Knight F., 1985. Kadimakara: extinct vertebrates of Australia. Princeton University Press.
- Tets, G F van, 1984. A checklist of extinct fossil Australasian birds. In Archer M and Clayton G (Eds.) Vertebrate Zoogeography and Evolution in Australasia (Animals in Space and Time). Hesperian Press. pp 468–475.
- Rich, P V and Tets, G F van, 1984. What fossil birds contribute towards an understanding of origin and development of the Australian avifauna. In Archer M and Clayton G (Eds.) Vertebrate Zoogeography and Evolution in Australasia (Animals in Space and Time). Hesperian Press. pp 421–446.
- Tets, G F van, and O'Connor S. 1983. The Hunter Island Penguin; an extinct new genus and species from a Tasmanian midden. Records of the Queen Victoria Museum 81. 1-13.
- Rich, P V and Tets, G F van, 1981. The Fossil Pelicans of Australia. Records of the South Australian Museum 18(12). 235-264.
- Tets, G F van, 1977. Guide to the Recognition and Reduction of Aerodrome Bird Hazards.
- Tets, G F van and Kolar, Kurt, 1970. Continent of Curiosities - Animals and Birds of Australia.
- Rich, P V and Tets, G van, 1976. Birds from Australia's Past. Australian Natural History 18(9). 338-341.
- Tets, G F van, 1969. Orange Runway Lighting as a Method for Reducing Bird Strike Damage to Aircraft.
- Tets, G F van, 1966a. Bird-banding on and Near Christmas Island. The Australian Bird Bander 4. 59.
- Tets, G F van, 1966b Two Dutch Quail-trapping Methods. The Australian Bird Bander 4. 36.
- Tets, G van, 1966c. Banding of Feral Domestic Pigeons. The Australian Bird Bander 4. 9.
- Tets, G F van, 1965. A Comparative Study of Some Social Communication Patterns in the Pelecaniformes. The American Ornithological Union, Ornithological Monographs, Number 2 : pages 1–88 with 78 figures and 30 tables.
