= Emu (journal) =

- Discipline: Ornithology
- Language: English

Publication details
- History: 1901–present
- Publisher: Taylor & Francis on behalf of BirdLife Australia (Australia)
- Frequency: Quarterly
- Impact factor: 1.895 (2012)

Standard abbreviations
- ISO 4: Emu

Indexing
- ISSN: 0158-4197 (print); 1448-5540 (web)
- OCLC no.: 1567848

Links
- Journal homepage; Journal at Taylor & Francis Online

Emu, subtitled Austral Ornithology, is the peer-reviewed scientific journal of BirdLife Australia (formerly the Royal Australasian Ornithologists Union). The journal was established in 1901 and is the oldest ornithological journal published in Australia. The current editor-in-chief is Kate Buchanan (Deakin University). The journal was published quarterly for the Royal Australasian Ornithologists Union in print and online by CSIRO Publishing until 2016. According to the Journal Citation Reports, the journal has a 2012 impact factor of 1.895, ranking it 4th out of 22 journals in the category "Ornithology".

== See also ==
- List of ornithology journals
