= Royal Australasian Ornithologists Union =

Bird research organisation

The Royal Australasian Ornithologists Union (RAOU), now part of BirdLife Australia, was Australia's largest non-government, non-profit, bird conservation organisation. It was founded in 1901 to promote the study and conservation of the native bird species of Australia and adjacent regions, making it Australia's oldest national birding association. In 1996, the organisation adopted the trading name of Birds Australia for most public purposes, while retaining its original name for legal purposes and as the publisher of its journal, the Emu. In 2012, the RAOU merged with Bird Observation & Conservation Australia to form BirdLife Australia.

The RAOU was the instigator of the Atlas of Australian Birds project. It also published (in association with Oxford University Press) the encyclopaedic Handbook of Australian, New Zealand and Antarctic Birds. Its quarterly colour membership magazine was Wingspan. The RAOU is the Australian Partner of BirdLife International, and had the motto "Conservation through Knowledge".

== History ==
=== Establishment ===
The RAOU was formally constituted (as the Australasian Ornithologist's Union) on 1 July 1901 in Melbourne, Victoria, following a series of informal meetings held by a small group of amateur ornithologists from 1896. The driving force behind the formation of the union was Archibald J. Campbell. Its founding membership was 137, including six women and 10 overseas members.

The first general meeting of members was held in Adelaide on 1 November 1901, where office-bearers were elected. The first president was Colonel William Vincent Legge of Tasmania, the secretary was Dudley Le Souef, the treasurer Robert Hall, and the editors Archibald J. Campbell and Henry Kendall. Such general meetings, soon termed "congresses" were held annually thereafter and were normally accompanied by the annual "campouts" of several days' duration, which gave members the opportunity to meet and to collect specimens and eggs.

=== Early years ===
Many RAOU members in the early 20th century called themselves "oologists", though the distinction between the notionally scientific discipline of oology and simple egg-collecting was blurred. Identification of any but the most common and distinctive species usually entailed the collection of specimens to be made into study skins. Modern field guides did not exist and few people could afford the massive multi-volume, lavishly illustrated handbooks of John Gould and Gregory Mathews. However, both Archibald J. Campbell and Alfred North had produced comprehensive guides to what was known about the nests and eggs of Australian birds, with illustrations of the eggs rather than the birds themselves, reflecting the dominance of egg and skin collecting in ornithology of the time.

On 12 April 1905, some Melbourne members formed the Bird Observers Club to facilitate more frequent and less formal meetings and field-trips. At this time, membership of the union was a prerequisite for membership of the club. In 1916, when the union acquired its own room for meetings and storage of donated specimens, it became impossible for the club to share the use of the room. This led to the club becoming inactive for the next few years, though it was successfully revived as an independent entity in 1927.

In 1907, the issue of bird conservation was raised prominently with the publication, in the Emu, of articles and photographs by Arthur Mattingley depicting starving egret nestlings in a breeding colony where the parent birds had been shot for the international trade in plumes for millinery. The photographs were widely reprinted internationally as part of a campaign to halt the trade. As a result, the fashion for wearing plumes in hats and head-dresses changed and the market collapsed.

In 1909, the union was one of the first major sponsors of the Gould League of Bird Lovers, which was founded by Jessie McMichael and supported by John Albert Leach, the Director of Nature Study in the Victorian Education Department. In 1910, the union was given permission by King George V, newly ascended to the throne, to use the prefix "Royal" on what had hitherto been simply the "Australasian Ornithologists Union".

Early in 1913, the first Official Checklist of the Birds of Australia was published as a supplement to the Emu. For many years, the compilation of checklists and the production of regular supplements to them was a constant activity, and the position of Chairman of the Checklist Committee was an important one. Almost immediately after the first Checklist was published, it was apparent that work needed to be continued towards a second edition, eventually published in 1926.

=== Changing attitudes ===
1911 was marked by the publication of An Australian Bird Book, by John Albert Leach. The popularity of the first edition ensured that a series of further editions and reprints continued into the 1960s. This was followed in 1931 with the first publication of Neville Cayley's What Bird is That?, further editions of which continued to be published into the 1980s. These books were focussed on bird identification rather than collecting and were affordable to the general public. They reflected the shifting mood in amateur ornithology, through the first half of the 20th century, from collecting to observation.

The annual campouts were increasingly being seen as opportunities for bird-watching, photography and non-destructive studies. During the 1933 campout near Moree, New South Wales, extensive egg-collecting by the oologists present aroused much criticism from other members; the egg-collectors were later formally censured. This growing split between members' attitudes to bird-study came to a head at the 1935 campout at Marlo, eastern Victoria, when a museum ornithologist, George Mack, provocatively shot a scarlet robin at its nest, which had been under observation by the party. This caused outrage among many members and was followed by a decision of the RAOU Council to appoint a committee to reconsider the question of collecting. The result was a policy that collecting of specimens, except under government permit, was not acceptable, and that no collecting should take place at campouts anyway.

=== Decline and division ===
Membership of the RAOU, after reaching a peak in the 1920s, went into a decline during the Great Depression and the Second World War, and there were difficulties meeting the costs of printing the Emu. After the War, membership numbers began to rise again. However, during the 1950s and 1960s, there was further division between the members. There were those who enjoyed the clubby atmosphere of the campouts and the comfortable, sometimes chatty, style of the Emu. Others, including those professionally involved in ornithology, as well as the more scientifically rigorous amateurs, wanted the RAOU to be scientifically credible and to publish an ornithological journal that merited international recognition.

The sudden death of Charles Bryant in 1960, while editor of the Emu, was another blow. He had edited and managed the publication of the journal for over 30 years, but had not prepared for his successor. Those who did succeed him during the 1960s struggled to maintain, let alone develop, the journal in a way that the membership and the changing times demanded, and its issue, due to problems with the printers, was becoming erratic. Moreover, the accounts were falling into disarray and the administrative backlog was becoming worse each year. There was increasing criticism from members, especially from the ACT branch, which contained a high proportion of professional scientists as members.

In a letter sent to the RAOU Council meeting in July 1966, the ACT branch strongly criticised the standard of the Emu, the administrative disorder, and the passivity regarding conservation and field studies. It finished by proposing two formal motions to (i) adopt active policies for organising research, publicity and education, and to (ii) set up a committee to implement the former. Subsequently, in September 1966, such a reform committee was appointed under the chairmanship of Keith Hindwood. However, the lack of agreement between committee members led to its disbandment in August 1967, less than a year later. The RAOU was in crisis.

=== Reform and revival ===
Up to this point, the Emu had been the only serial publication produced by the RAOU for all members, and was by far the biggest financial cost to the organisation. For a majority of members the receipt of the journal was the only direct contact they had with the RAOU. Yet the content of Emu was being assailed from both the 'scientists' who wanted more rigour and less in-house material, and from the 'amateurs' who disliked the scientific language of many papers. The long-term solution would be to cater separately for both groups. The start of this process came with the decision by the RAOU Council in 1968 to allow for a type of membership without a subscription to Emu. The next step was when Jack Hyett resigned as editor of Emu in 1968, the ACT Branch nominated Stephen Marchant for the editorship, and he was elected unopposed. Marchant was editor for the next twelve years and he transformed Emu into the lean and rigorous journal the 'scientists' wanted.

With regard to other necessary reforms, the new president, Allan McEvey, set up a new review committee of two, Dom Serventy and himself. Serventy, a scientist with the CSIRO, was the principal writer of the review report and he addressed both the need for a sense of what the RAOU should be doing, and the structure that would allow it to do so. Although there was considerable vocal opposition to the reform proposals (including cutting the number of people on Council from an unwieldy forty to just nine) the report was ratified by Council in April 1969 and adopted at an Extraordinary General Meeting in June 1969, with the vote being over 80% in favour. Later that year came the first issue of the RAOU Newsletter, a publication that would evolve to become the magazine Wingspan.

A perhaps unavoidable consequence of the reforms was the alienation of some of the members and Council officers. The drastic reduction in the number of Councillors meant that many regional positions in particular no longer existed. Some members left the organisation and many transferred their active loyalty to the Bird Observers Club. Independent regional groups were established to cater for those who felt disenfranchised by the new order, replacing previous RAOU branches. A comparison of the names of Council officers between 1968 and 1972 shows almost complete replacement, with most change occurring between 1969 and 1970. The process of renewal was painful and the sense of alienation, for some, was permanent.

One test of the reformed RAOU was to be the extent of its involvement with the International Ornithological Congress (IOC), held in Canberra in 1974 with about 800 delegates attending. The secretary-general of the congress (i.e. the principal organiser) was Dr Harold Frith who was not only one of the hardliners of the 'scientists' faction of the pre-reform RAOU, but had also threatened to start a competing group with its own journal if the reforms had not proceeded. Ultimately the RAOU contributed to the success of the IOC through provision of funding (along with the Australian Academy of Science (AAC) and the administrative assistance of the CSIRO), and with the organisation of excursions for delegates. The appointment in 1974 of Tommy Garnett as RAOU secretary was also a move that assisted in bringing order to the growing administrative demands of the evolving organisation.

=== Projects, personnel and property ===
An essential part of the revolution within the RAOU in the late 1960s, and its evolution during the 1970s was a strong push to carry out scientific field studies with the involvement of volunteers. The first of the major projects undertaken was the Atlas of Australian Birds. Fieldwork for this project took place over five calendar years 1977-1981 and transformed the organisation. Pauline Reilly was RAOU president and an enthusiastic proponent of the Atlas in the years leading up to the fieldwork phase of the project and she was subsequently Chair of the Atlas Committee which oversaw the project. The first paid staff members of the RAOU were appointed in connection with the project, and the first property, a small house in Dryburgh Street, North Melbourne, acquired as premises for it in 1976. It soon became obvious that the house was too small and an upgrade was necessary; it was replaced in 1979 by a house in Gladstone Street, Moonee Ponds. The logistics of managing a national bird atlassing project, with 3000 volunteer atlassers mapping the avifauna of a continent, stretched the resources of the organisation beyond reasonable limits, but the RAOU was forced to grow in the process.

The period of the first Atlas also coincided with a move to establish bird observatories as field research centres. These were Eyre in 1976, Rotamah Island in 1979, Barren Grounds in 1982, and Broome in 1988. Later the emphasis shifted from the establishment of field centres to the purchase of large properties as habitat conservation, with the acquisition of Gluepot Reserve in 1997 and Newhaven Reserve in 2000.

=== Reconciling with the "amateurs"... ===
Between the beginning and the end of the first Atlas project RAOU membership grew from fewer than a thousand to over two thousand. Not all Atlassers became members, but many did, and most of them were not interested in subscribing to the Emu but were happy to receive the RAOU Newsletter that contained all the informal in-house news that the pre-reform Emu had carried. In 1991, the newsletter was renamed Wingspan, a glossy colour magazine received by all members. By 2004, fewer than 20% of RAOU members subscribed to the Emu.

In 1996, the RAOU formally adopted the name Birds Australia for most public purposes, and updated its logo from a lone emu to an emu with a family of chicks, reflecting new growth in the size and number of its regional groups.

=== ...while keeping the "scientists" happy ===
1996 also saw the first Southern Hemisphere Ornithological Conference (SHOC), held in Albany, Western Australia. This was an initiative of Professor Brian Collins, RAOU president at the time. Another SHOC was held at Griffith University, Brisbane, in 2000 before the RAOU refined its conference concept and initiated the first Australasian Ornithological Conference (AOC), hosted with Charles Sturt University at Bathurst, New South Wales in December 2001. Also from 2001, the direct management and publication of the Emu was outsourced to CSIRO Publishing, which already handled a large stable of international and Australian scientific journals.

=== HANZAB ===
Other projects, such as the Australian Bird Count (1989–1995), followed the first Atlas. However, the project that would dominate the period from the early 1980s until 2006 was the Handbook of Australian, New Zealand and Antarctic Birds (HANZAB). Financially it was the biggest project of all, and one that strained RAOU resources more than any other. The need to provide adequate working conditions for HANZAB staff was one factor that forced another move of its head office to larger premises in Riversdale Road, Hawthorn in 1994.

=== State of Australia's Birds ===
Since 2003 Birds Australia has produced an annual State of Australia's Birds (SOAB) report. The reports collate and disseminate information on trends in bird populations to inform Australians of the status of their birds. The 2003 and 2008 editions of SOAB are five-yearly overviews, while the other editions are themed on various aspects of Australian avifauna (e.g. SOAB 2010 was themed on Birds and Islands). Some of the material presented in SOAB is extracted from Birds Australia projects, notably the Atlas of Australian Birds project.

=== The future ===
The final volume of HANZAB was published in 2006, and an era in the history of the RAOU came to an end. In March 2007, the RAOU moved its National Office to new, smaller premises in the Green Building at 60 Leicester Street, Carlton, Melbourne.

On 21 May 2011, members of both Birds Australia and Bird Observation & Conservation Australia (BOCA) voted by an overwhelming majority at their respective annual general meetings to merge the two organisations into one entity, to be named BirdLife Australia.

== Regional Groups ==
The RAOU / Birds Australia has several Regional Groups that cater for members based in particular geographic regions of Australia, as well as looking at the bird conservation challenges of those regions. These are:

- Birds Australia Capricornia (BAC) is a regional group of Birds Australia based in the Rockhampton and Yeppoon region of Central Queensland and covering the geographical area from Bundaberg to Birdsville in the south and Gumlu to Boulia in the North. Birds Australia Capricornia was formed in 2002. Members of Birds Australia resident in the area of coverage are automatically members of the group. A quarterly newsletter is sent to members. Activities provided for members include meetings, a variety of field trips, bird surveys and conservation projects.
- Birds Australia North Queensland (BANQ)
- Birds Australia Northern NSW (BANN) is a regional group of Birds Australia based in northern New South Wales. BANN was formed in 1987 following a campout by RAOU members at Dorrigo the previous year. Members of Birds Australia resident in the area of coverage are automatically members of the group. A quarterly newsletter is sent to members. Activities provided for members include meetings, a variety of field trips, bird surveys and conservation projects.
- Birds Australia Southern NSW & ACT (BASNA)
- Birds Australia Southern Queensland (BASQ)
- Birds Australia Victoria (BA-VIC) is the Victorian regional group of Birds Australia. BA-VIC was formed in 1982. Members of Birds Australia resident in Victoria are automatically members of BA-VIC. The quarterly newsletter is Vic Babbler. Activities provided for members include monthly meetings, a variety of excursions and campouts, bird surveys and conservation projects. Past presidents include prominent ornithologists Margaret Cameron and Tim Dolby. BA-VIC also organizes the Victorian Twitchathon and Birdline Victoria. In 2009, in association with Allen & Unwin, BA-VIC published a new bird book, Where to See Birds in Victoria, edited by Tim Dolby, featuring the best places in Victoria for seeing birds.
- Birds Australia Western Australia (BAWA) is the Western Australian regional group of Birds Australia. BAWA was formed in 1943 and incorporated in 2001. Members of Birds Australia resident in Western Australia are automatically members of BAWA. BAWA maintains an office, Peregrine House, at Floreat, Perth. It also publishes a quarterly newsletter, WA Bird Notes. Activities provided for members include monthly meetings, a variety of excursions ranging from half-day outings to extensive campouts, bird surveys and conservation projects.
- Birds Tasmania (BA-TAS)

== Special Interest Groups ==
The RAOU / Birds Australia has Special Interest Groups that focus attention on particular groups of birds that have special study and conservation needs. These are:

- Australasian Raptor Association (ARA) - birds of prey, including eagles, falcons, hawks and owls
- Australasian Seabird Group (ASG) - seabirds, including albatrosses, petrels, penguins, gulls and terns
- Australasian Wader Studies Group (AWSG) - waders or shorebirds
- Birds Australia Parrot Association (BAPA) - parrots, including cockatoos, lories and lorikeets. It publishes the newsletter Eclectus. It was formed in 1996 with the objectives:
  - To develop plans for parrot research and management in Australasia in conjunction with other interested bodies;
  - To coordinate and encourage scientific projects using amateur and professional skills;
  - To encourage and assist with the publication of results;
  - To maintain effective communication on parrot matters within Australasia, and with similar groups elsewhere; and
  - To formulate and promote policies for the conservation and management of parrots and their habitat.
- In 2007 a new Birds Australia Ethnoornithology Special Interest Group was established.

== Bird observatories ==
Four bird observatories were established by the RAOU in order to provide accommodation and act as bases for research, education and recreation, in areas of particular interest and bird richness. Two of these, Barren Grounds Bird Observatory in NSW, and Rotamah Island Bird Observatory in Victoria, have since been closed for economic reasons. The two remaining observatories, both in Western Australia, are:

- Broome Bird Observatory (BBO)
- Eyre Bird Observatory (EBO)

== Reserves ==
The RAOU has established two reserves, through the purchase of large pastoral leases, in order to protect extensive areas of important bird habitat. They are:

- Gluepot Reserve
- Newhaven Reserve

Newhaven Reserve was sold to the Australian Wildlife Conservancy in 2007. The RAOU retains access rights for its members and a say in monitoring and research on the reserve through the Newhaven Management Committee.

== Honours and awards ==
The RAOU has always recognised service to the organisation and to ornithology through the granting of the title of Fellow of the Royal Australasian Ornithologists Union (FRAOU) to a small and limited number of individuals. It also recognises excellence in contributions to ornithological knowledge through annual awards: the D.L. Serventy Medal for outstanding published work on birds in the Australasian region, and the John Hobbs Medal for major contributions to amateur ornithology.

== Notable members ==
- Gordon Binns
- Frank Littler (F. M. Littler)
- Henry Luke White (H. L. White)
- Harry Wolstenholme

== See also ==
- The Finch Society of Australia
