= Handbook of mathematical functions =

Handbook of Mathematical Functions may refer to:

- NBS Handbook of Mathematical Functions (with Formulas, Graphs, and Mathematical Tables) a.k.a. Abramowitz and Stegun, a mathematical textbook published in 1964
- NIST Handbook of Mathematical Functions, the successor mathematical textbook published in 2010
