= Common logarithm =

Mathematical function

A graph of the common logarithm of numbers from 0.1 to 100

In mathematics, the common logarithm (aka "standard logarithm") is the logarithm with base 10. It is also known as the decadic logarithm, the decimal logarithm and the Briggsian logarithm. The name "Briggsian logarithm" is in honor of the British mathematician Henry Briggs who conceived of and developed the values for the "common logarithm". Historically, the "common logarithm" was known by its Latin name logarithmus decimalis or logarithmus decadis.

The mathematical notation for using the common logarithm is log(x), log_{10}(x), or sometimes Log(x) with a capital L; (Note: The notation Log is ambiguous, as this can also mean the complex natural logarithmic multi-valued function.) on calculators, it is printed as "log", but mathematicians usually mean natural logarithm (logarithm with base e ≈ 2.71828) rather than common logarithm when writing "log", since the natural logarithm is – contrary to what the name of the common logarithm implies – the most commonly used logarithm in pure math.

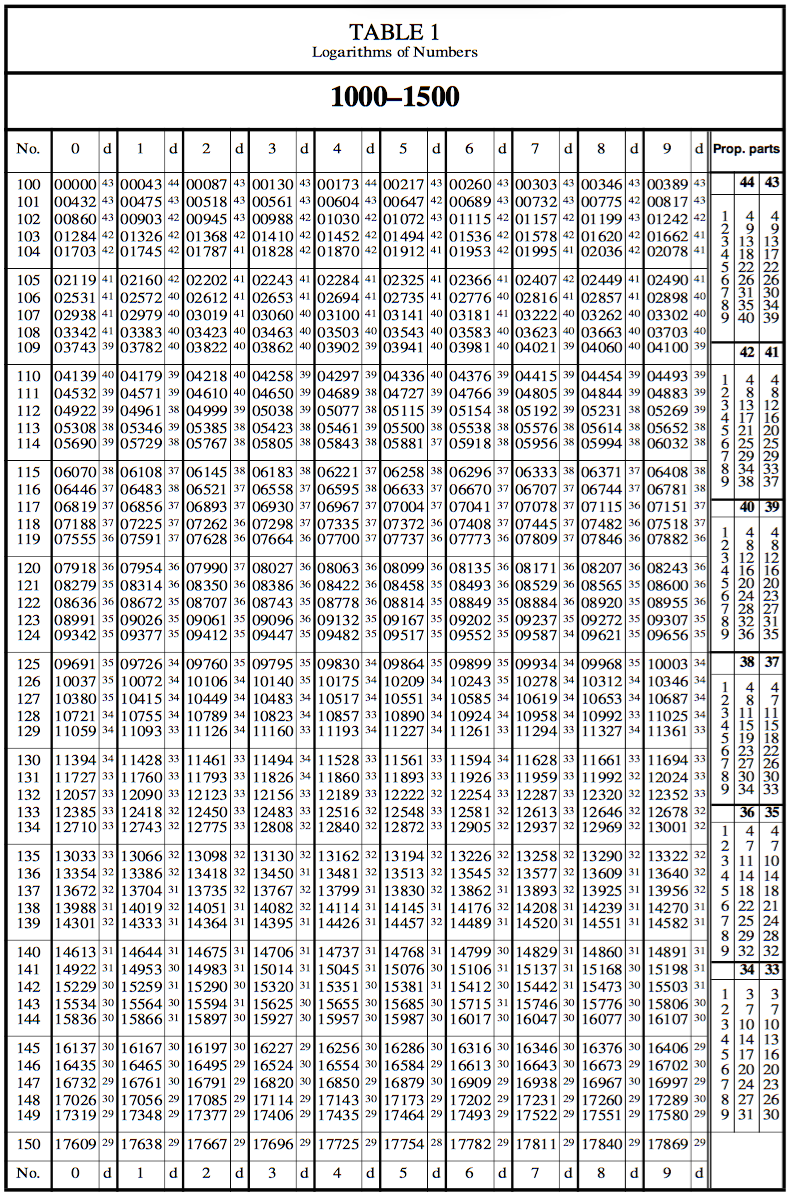
Page from a table of common logarithms. This page shows the logarithms for numbers from 1000 to 1509 to five decimal places. The complete table covers values up to 9999.

Before the early 1970s, handheld electronic calculators were not available, and mechanical calculators capable of multiplication were bulky, expensive, and not widely available. Instead, tables of base-10 logarithms were used in science, engineering and navigation—when calculations required greater accuracy than could be achieved with a slide rule. By turning multiplication and division to addition and subtraction, use of logarithms avoided laborious and error-prone paper-and-pencil multiplications and divisions. Because logarithms were so useful, tables of base-10 logarithms were given in appendices of many textbooks. Mathematical and navigation handbooks included tables of the logarithms of trigonometric functions as well. For the history of such tables, see log table.

Numbers are placed on slide rule scales at distances proportional to the differences between their logarithms. By mechanically adding the distance from 1 to 2 on the lower scale to the distance from 1 to 3 on the upper scale, one can quickly determine that 2 × 3 = 6.

== Mantissa and characteristic ==
An important property of base-10 logarithms, which makes them so useful in calculations, is that the logarithm of numbers greater than 1 that differ by a factor of a power of 10 all have the same fractional part. The fractional part is known as the mantissa. (Note: This use of the word mantissa stems from an older, non-numerical, meaning: a minor addition or supplement, e.g., to a text. The word was introduced by Henry Briggs. The word "mantissa" is often used to describe the part of a floating-point number that represents its significant digits, although "significand" was the term used for this by IEEE 754, and may be preferred to avoid confusion with logarithm mantissas.) Thus, log tables need only show the fractional part. Tables of common logarithms typically listed the mantissa, to four or five decimal places or more, of each number in a range, e.g. 1000 to 9999.

The integer part, called the characteristic, can be computed by simply counting how many places the decimal point must be moved, so that it is just to the right of the first significant digit. For example, the logarithm of 120 is given by the following calculation:
$$\log_{10}(120) = \log_{10}\left(10^2 \times 1.2\right) = 2 + \log_{10}(1.2) \approx 2 + 0.07918.$$

The last number (0.07918)—the fractional part or the mantissa of the common logarithm of 120—can be found in the table shown. The location of the decimal point in 120 tells us that the integer part of the common logarithm of 120, the characteristic, is 2.

By applying this reasoning it can be seen that $\log_{10}(120) = 2.07918$, $\log_{10}(12) = 1.07918$, and $\log_{10}(1.2) = 0.07918.$

=== Negative logarithms ===
Positive numbers less than 1 have negative logarithms. For example,
$$\log_{10}(0.012) = \log_{10}\left(10^{-2} \times 1.2\right) = -2 + \log_{10}(1.2) \approx -2 + 0.07918 = -1.92082.$$

To avoid the need for separate tables to convert positive and negative logarithms back to their original numbers, one can express a negative logarithm as a negative integer characteristic plus a positive mantissa. To facilitate this, a special notation, called bar notation, is used:
$$\log_{10}(0.012) \approx \bar{2} + 0.07918 = -1.92082.$$

The bar over the characteristic indicates that it is negative, while the mantissa remains positive. When reading a number in bar notation out loud, the symbol $\bar{n}$ is read as "bar n", so that $\bar{2}.07918$ is read as "bar 2 point 07918...". An alternative convention is to express the logarithm modulo 10, in which case
$$\log_{10}(0.012) \approx 8.07918 \bmod 10,$$
with the actual value of the result of a calculation determined by knowledge of the reasonable range of the result. (Note: For example, Bessel, F. W. (1825). "Über die Berechnung der geographischen Längen und Breiten aus geodätischen Vermessungen". Astronomische Nachrichten. 331 (8): 852–861. arXiv:0908.1823. Bibcode:1825AN......4..241B. doi:10.1002/asna.18260041601. S2CID 118630614. gives (beginning of section 8) $\log b = 6.51335464$, $\log e = 8.9054355$. From the context, it is understood that $b = 10^{6.51335464}$, the minor radius of the earth ellipsoid in toise (a large number), whereas $e = 10^{8.9054355-10}$, the eccentricity of the earth ellipsoid (a small number).)

The following example uses the bar notation to calculate 0.012 × 0.85 = 0.0102:
$$\begin{array}{rll}
\text{As found above,}          &  \log_{10}(0.012) \approx\bar{2}.07918\\
\text{Since}\;\;\log_{10}(0.85) &= \log_{10}\left(10^{-1}\times 8.5\right) = -1 + \log_{10}(8.5) &\approx -1 + 0.92942 = \bar{1}.92942\\
\log_{10}(0.012 \times 0.85)    &= \log_{10}(0.012) + \log_{10}(0.85)                            &\approx \bar{2}.07918 + \bar{1}.92942\\
&= (-2 + 0.07918) + (-1 + 0.92942)                               &= -(2 + 1) + (0.07918 + 0.92942)\\
&= -3 + 1.00860                                                  &= -2 + 0.00860\;^*\\
&\approx \log_{10}\left(10^{-2}\right) + \log_{10}(1.02)         &= \log_{10}(0.01 \times 1.02)\\
&= \log_{10}(0.0102).
\end{array}$$

* This step makes the mantissa between 0 and 1, so that its antilog (10^{mantissa}) can be looked up.

The following table shows how the same mantissa can be used for a range of numbers differing by powers of ten:

Common logarithm, characteristic, and mantissa of powers of 10 times a number
Number	Logarithm	Characteristic	Mantissa	Combined form
n = 5 × 10^{i}	log_{10}(n)	i = floor(log_{10}(n))	log_{10}(n) − i	
5 000 000	6.698 970...	6	0.698 970...	6.698 970...
50	1.698 970...	1	0.698 970...	1.698 970...
5	0.698 970...	0	0.698 970...	0.698 970...
0.5	−0.301 029...	−1	0.698 970...	1̅.698 970...
0.000 005	−5.301 029...	−6	0.698 970...	6̅.698 970...

Note that the mantissa is common to all of the 5 × 10^{i}. This holds for any positive real number $x\times 10^i$ because
$$\log_{10}\left(x \times10^i\right) = \log_{10}(x) + \log_{10}\left(10^i\right) = \log_{10}(x) + i.$$

Since i is a constant, the mantissa comes from $\log_{10}(x)$, which is constant for given $x$. This allows a table of logarithms to include only one entry for each mantissa. In the example of 5 × 10^{i}, 0.698 970 (004 336 018 ...) will be listed once indexed by 5 (or 0.5, or 500, etc.).

== History ==
Common logarithms are sometimes also called "Briggsian logarithms" after Henry Briggs, a 17th century British mathematician. In 1616 and 1617, Briggs visited John Napier at Edinburgh, the inventor of what are now called natural (base-e) logarithms, in order to suggest a change to Napier's logarithms. During these conferences, the alteration proposed by Briggs was agreed upon; and after his return from his second visit, he published the first chiliad of his logarithms.

Because base-10 logarithms were most useful for computations, engineers generally simply wrote "log(x)" when they meant log_{10}(x). Mathematicians, on the other hand, wrote "log(x)" when they meant log_{e}(x) for the natural logarithm. Today, both notations are found. Since hand-held electronic calculators are designed by engineers rather than mathematicians, it became customary that they follow engineers' notation. So the notation, according to which one writes "ln(x)" when the natural logarithm is intended, may have been further popularized by the very invention that made the use of "common logarithms" far less common, electronic calculators.

To mitigate the ambiguity, the ISO 80000 specification recommends that log_{e}(x) should be ln(x), while log_{10}(x) should be written lg(x), which unfortunately is used for the base-2 logarithm by CLRS and Sedgwick and The Chicago Manual of Style.

== Numeric value ==
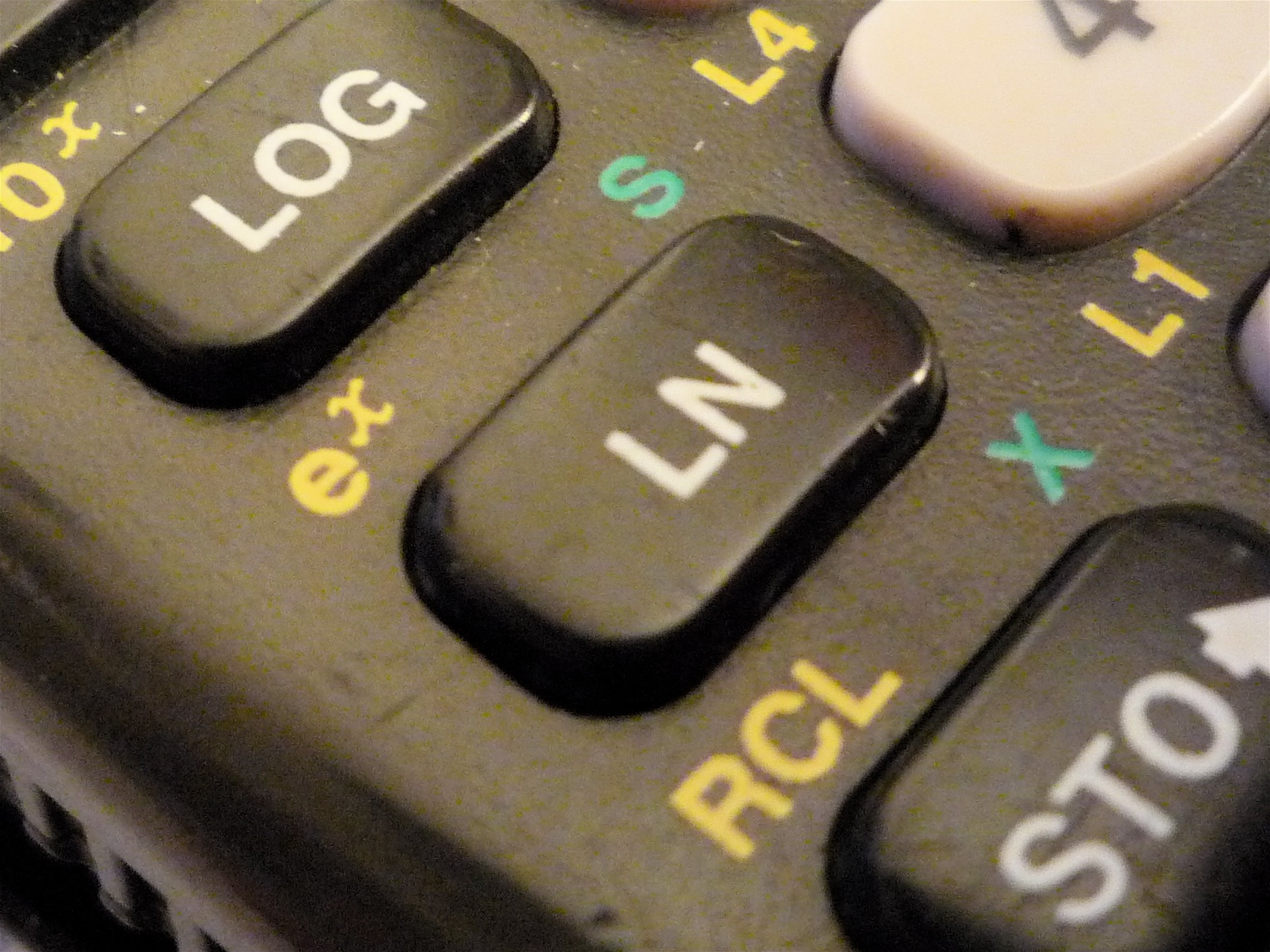
The logarithm keys (log for base-10 and ln for base-e) on a typical scientific calculator. The advent of hand-held calculators largely eliminated the use of common logarithms as an aid to computation.

The numerical value for logarithm to the base 10 can be calculated with the following identities:
$$\log_{10}(x) = \frac{\ln(x)}{\ln(10)} = \frac{\log_2(x)}{\log_2(10)} = \frac{\log_B(x)}{\log_B(10)}$$
using logarithms of any available base $\, B ~.$

as procedures exist for determining the numerical value for logarithm base e (see Natural logarithm § Efficient computation) and logarithm base 2 (see Algorithms for computing binary logarithms).

== Derivative ==
The derivative of a logarithm with a base b is such that
$${d \over dx}\log_b(x)={1 \over x\ln (b)},$$
therefore ${d \over dx}\log_{10}(x)={1 \over x\ln(10)}\approx{0.4343 \over x}$ (4 significant digits).

== See also ==
- Binary logarithm
- Cologarithm
- Decibel
- Logarithmic scale
- Napierian logarithm
- Significand (also commonly called mantissa)
- Scientific notation
- Orders of Magnitude (numbers)

== Bibliography ==
- Abramowitz, Milton; Stegun, Irene Ann, eds. (1983) [June 1964]. Handbook of Mathematical Functions with Formulas, Graphs, and Mathematical Tables. Applied Mathematics Series. Vol. 55 (Ninth reprint with additional corrections of tenth original printing with corrections (December 1972); first ed.). Washington D.C.; New York: United States Department of Commerce, National Bureau of Standards; Dover Publications. ISBN 978-0-486-61272-0. LCCN 64-60036. MR 0167642. LCCN 65-12253.
- Möser, Michael (2009). Engineering Acoustics: An Introduction to Noise Control. Springer. p. 448. ISBN 978-3-540-92722-8.
- Poliyanin, Andrei Dmitrievich; Manzhirov, Alexander Vladimirovich (2007) [2006-11-27]. Handbook of mathematics for engineers and scientists. CRC Press. p. 9. ISBN 978-1-58488-502-3.
