= Birds of Western Australia (book) =

Book by Dominic Serventy

- Author: D.L. Serventy & H.M. Whittell
- Illustrator: Olive Seymour and Harley Webster
- Cover artist: Harley Webster
- Language: English
- Subject: Western Australian ornithology
- Genre: Ornithological handbooks
- Published: 1948 Patersons Press Ltd Perth, Western Australia
- Publication place: Australia
- Media type: Print (hardcover) with dustjacket
- Pages: vi + 366 (1st edn), x + 482 (5th edn)
- ISBN: 0-85564-101-0 (5th edn)
- Dewey Decimal: 598.29941

The Birds of Western Australia is a book first published in 1948 by Patersons Press Ltd in Perth, Western Australia. Its full title was originally A Handbook of the Birds of Western Australia (with the exception of the Kimberley Division), though with the publication of the 5th edition only the shorter form was used. It was authored by Dominic Serventy and Hubert Whittell. It was issued in octavo format (228 x 148 mm) and contains 372 pages bound in blue buckram with a dustjacket illustrated with a painting of Australian pelicans by Harley Webster. It contains a coloured frontispiece of paintings of the heads of Meliphaga honeyeaters, with numerous black-and-white drawings and maps scattered through the text. The second edition (1951) contained colour plates by Olive Seymour.

The book covered birds recorded within the Australian state of Western Australia except, as the full title of the first edition indicates, the tropical Kimberley region of its north. It was the first Australian regional ornithological handbook. In the Introduction the authors state:

”The need for some such Handbook as this one was impressed on the authors by their own early experiences in Western Australian ornithology. Perhaps, however, they flatter themselves unduly for presenting to the bird-loving public a book which they like to feel is one of the type they wished had been available to them when beginning the study of local birds.”

With regard to the layout of the book, they say:

”The first two sections deal with the history of Western Australian ornithology and a discussion of the bird geography of the State. Though complete in themselves both are supplementary to the third section, the detailed treatment of the species of birds occurring in our area.”

The success of the book was such that, for many years, it was the principal source of information on the birds of the state. Further editions appeared in 1951, 1962, 1967 and 1976, the fifth and final one being published by the University of Western Australia Press, with the length having increased by then to some 490 pages. It was described later in the preface to the state's next ornithological handbook as:

”…a landmark in Australian ornithology. Its high standard and concise presentation provided a stimulus for a great deal of ornithological research in this State.”
