= Harley Webster =

Harley Webster may refer to:

- Phrase (rapper) (Harley Webster, born 1981), Australian hip hop MC
- Harley Webster (illustrator) (born 1909), Australian illustrator and conservationist
