= Hubert Whittell =

British army officer and Australian farmer and ornithologist

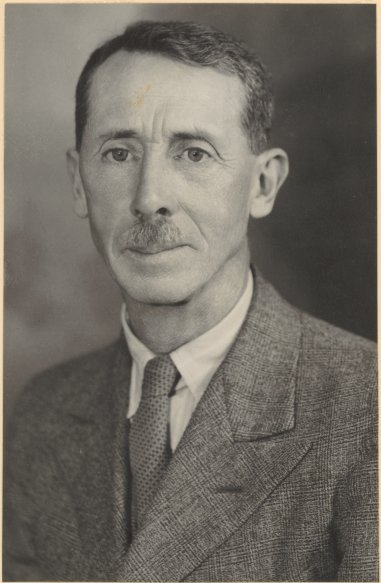
Hubert Whittell

Hubert Massey Whittell OBE (24 March 1883 – 7 February 1954) was a British army officer, and later an Australian farmer and ornithologist who compiled a history and bibliography of ornithology in Australia from its origins until the mid-20th century.

== Early days ==
Whittell was born at Stratford in Essex, England, now part of Greater London. His father, an engineer and naval architect was the Bombay representative of Lloyd's of London, and Whittell grew up in both India and England, as well as attending school for a year in Germany in 1894. In 1899 he began studying medicine at Edinburgh University. In 1899, Whittell donated to Edinburgh Museum a specimen of an Atlantic puffin (Fratercula arctica) taken in County Mayo, Ireland. His address was then given as 53, Merchiston Crescent, Edinburgh. In August 1901, he made an ornithological expedition to Orkney and collected a specimen of a red-necked phalarope (Phalaropus hyperboreus) from Stromness. However, in 1903 he gave up his medical studies to pursue a career in the British Army.

== Military career ==
In September 1904, after service with the 2nd Battalion the Royal Guernsey Light Infantry (Channel Islands Militia), Whittell passed a competitive examination and in December was gazetted a second lieutenant in the 1st Battalion the Royal Sussex Regiment, with which he was posted to India in 1905. In November 1907 he was promoted lieutenant, and transferred to the Indian Army, joining the 56th Punjabi Rifles, being promoted to captain in 1913. He studied Urdu, Pushtu and Persian, collected old Indian coins, went big game hunting and published papers on local history. He married Sydney Margaret O'Hara Hodgkins in 1911 in Bombay. Following the outbreak of World War I he served in France, Belgium and Egypt for the duration of the war, after which he returned to India to serve in the Third Anglo-Afghan War in 1919. He was twice mentioned in despatches and was promoted to major. In June 1921, while serving with the Supplies and Transport Corps of the Indian Army, he was appointed an Officer of the Order of the British Empire (Military Division). In 1926 he retired from the Indian Army and emigrated to Australia.

== Ornithology ==
Whittell settled with his family at Bridgetown, Western Australia, 270 kilometres (170 mi) south of Perth, where he bought an orchard and a dairy farm which he managed successfully, becoming a prosperous member of the local farming community. By 1929 he had revived a lifelong interest in birds and was ornithologically active, joining the Royal Australasian Ornithologists Union (RAOU) that year. He started building up a bird egg and skin collection, as well as establishing an ornithological library. He also made several collecting trips in the south-west and south-east of Western Australia.

In 1939 Whittell became Convener of the RAOU's Checklist Committee, serving also as President of the Union 1941–1943. A keen conservationist, from 1946 he served on the State Fauna Protection Advisory Committee. In 1943 he began a collaboration with Dominic Serventy on a regional handbook, the Birds of Western Australia, the first edition of which was published in 1948. From the mid-1930s he had been working on a comprehensive history and bibliography of Australian ornithology, The Literature of Australian Birds, a monumental 900-page volume published in 1954 not long after his death.

Whittell was described by his friend and collaborator Dom Serventy as follows:

”Physically he was a slight man, of restless disposition, and his physiognomy, with the keen face and the alert prominent blue-grey eyes, reminded one strikingly of some of the profile portraits of Frederick the Great. Personally he was of the highest integrity and he despised any adventitious aid to advancement, such as joining the 'right' social organisations or currying favour with persons supposed to have influence. He found it difficult to suffer fools gladly and this, combined with a somewhat choleric temperament at times, alienated some of his acquaintances. Others were never quite at their ease in his presence, never knowing whether to take his quips, uttered in a clipped English accent, as real reproaches or humorous chaffing. However, when acquaintance passed to friendship his ripe observations from an intelligent and well-stocked mind, on people, places and things, combined with his essential good nature and fair dealing, made him an agreeable and congenial companion.”

Whittell was awarded Life Memberships of the St John Ambulance Association, the Returned Sailors' and Soldiers' Imperial League of Australia, and the Western Australian Naturalists' Club. He died in 1954 following long and painful complications from surgery carried out more than a year previously in December 1952. He was survived by his wife, a daughter, two sons and three grandchildren.

== Publications ==
As well as numerous papers in The Emu and other journals, notes and popular articles, book-length works authored or coauthored by Whittell include:

- Serventy, D.L.; Whittell, H.M. (1948). A Handbook of the Birds of Western Australia. Perth: Paterson's Press Ltd.
- Whittell, H.M.; Serventy, D.L. (1948). A Systematic List of the Birds of Western Australia. Perth: Public Library, Museum and Art Gallery of Western Australia.
- Whittell, Hubert Massey (1954). The Literature of Australian Birds: A History and a Bibliography of Australian Ornithology (PDF). Perth: Paterson Brokensha. LCCN 56000760. OCLC 2851290. OL 6194318M. Wikidata Q7747557.
