= MAOL table book =

- Language: Finnish
- ISBN: 9511160532

MAOL tables (Finnish: MAOL-taulukot, Swedish: MAOLs tabeller) is a reference handbook published by MAOL, the Finnish association for teachers of mathematical subjects, and distributed by Otava in both printed and digital forms. It is a book of numeric tables to aid in studying mathematics, chemistry and physics at the gymnasium level. The book includes a list of mathematical notation and symbols, scientific units and constants, a diverse collection of formulae, and several numeric tables. The Finnish Matriculation Examination Board has accepted the book and allowed it to be used in the Finnish matriculation examinations. From 2020 onwards, only the digital version has been allowed, and it is included for free in the digital examination environment, Abitti.

The colour of the cover of the book is changed with each edition of the book.

== See also ==
- Mathematical table
- Handbook of Mathematical Functions with Formulas, Graphs, and Mathematical Tables
- Reference book
- Handbook
- Rubber book (for chemistry & physics)
- BINAS, a Dutch science handbook

== Literature ==
- Seppänen, Raimo et al.: MAOL-taulukot. Matemaattisten aineiden opettajien liitto, Otava, 1991. ISBN 951-1-16053-2.
