= Ida Rhodes =

American mathematician

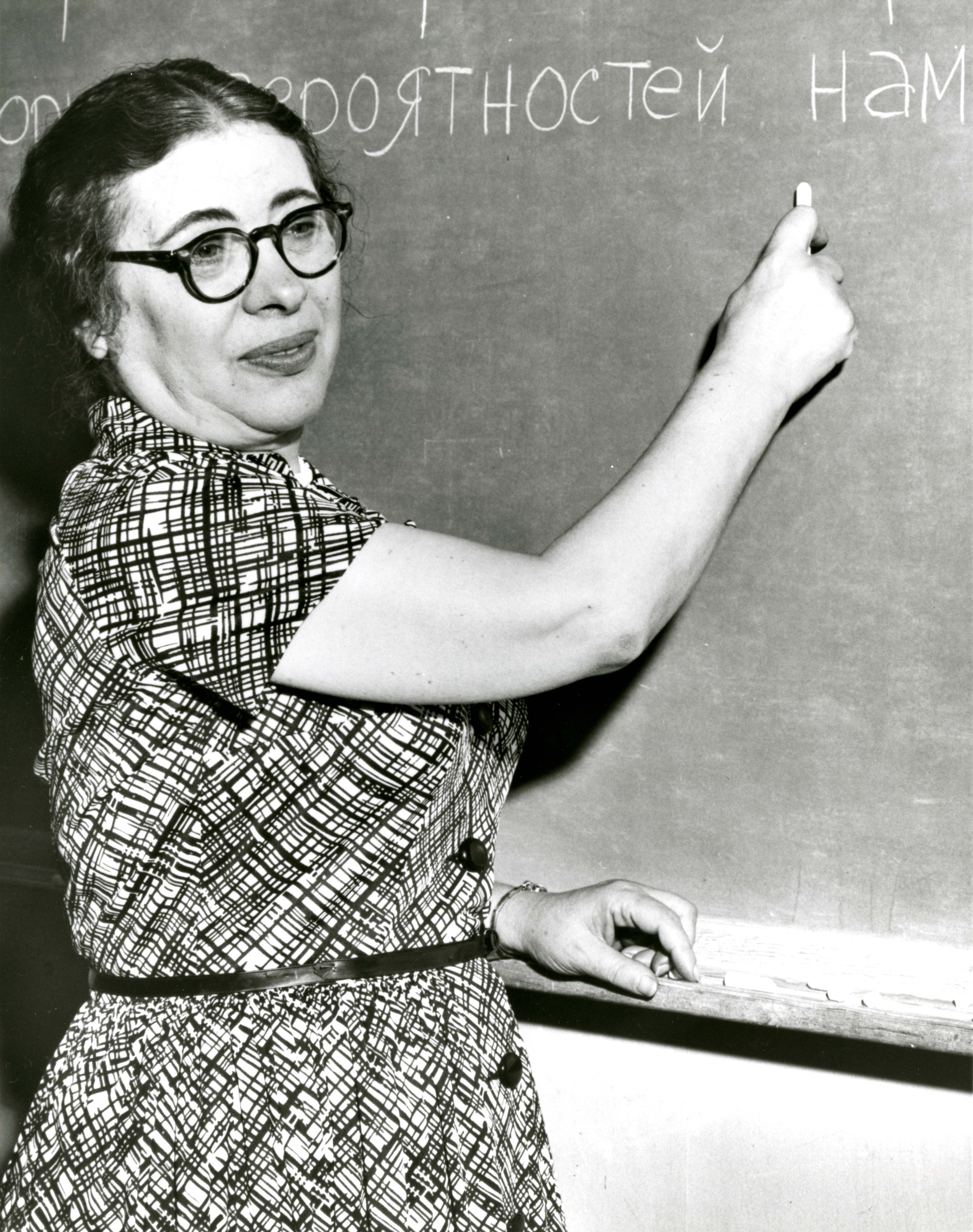
- Rhodes in 1959
- Born: Hadassah Itzkowitz; May 15, 1900; Kamianets-Podilskyi, Ukraine
- Died: February 1, 1986 (aged 85)
- Education: Cornell University (BA, MA); Columbia University

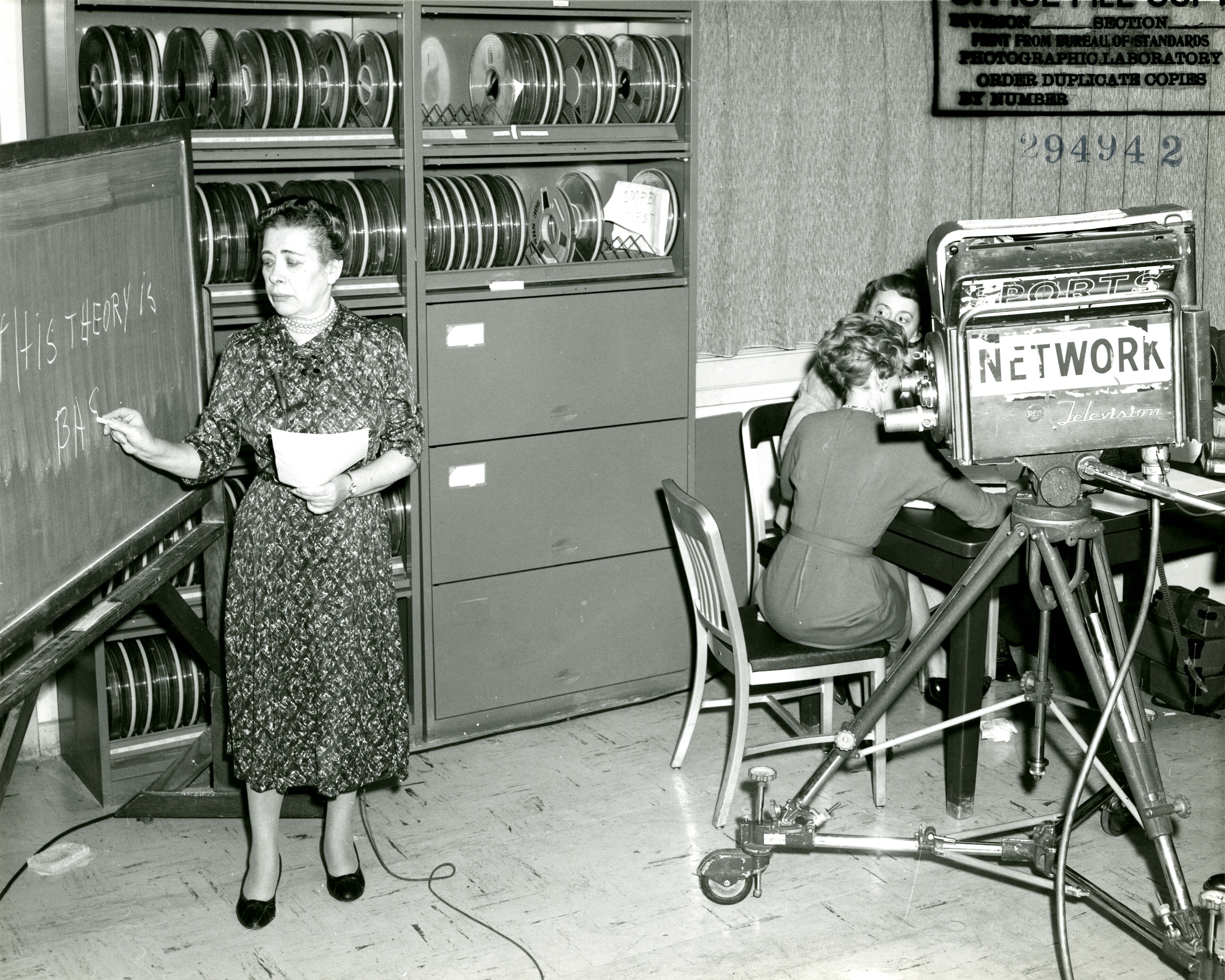
Filming of Ida Rhodes (left) at IBM. National Bureau of Standards (NBS) mathematician and computer expert Ida Rhodes demonstrates her pioneering work in computer translation of languages. Rhodes was among the first to realize the importance of parsing sentences and separating the roots of words from their prefixes and suffixes as initial steps in the process of computer translation.

Ida Rhodes (born Hadassah Itzkowitz; May 15, 1900 – February 1, 1986) was an American mathematician who became a member of the clique of influential women at the heart of early computer development in the United States.

== Childhood ==
Ida Rhodes (Hadassah Ida Schachnes) was born in 1900 in a small village near the city of Kamenets-Podolski, in the Russian Empire, which is now a part of Ukraine. Her family was Jewish, and her early life was marked by the political and social unrest of the region.

She was 13 years old in 1913 when her parents, David and Bessie (née Sinkler) Itzkowitz, brought her to the United States. Her name was changed upon entering the country to Ida Itzkowitz.

She sustained a connection to her Judaism even in her computing work, publishing a paper called “Computation of the Dates of the Hebrew New Year and Passover” in Computers and Mathematics with Applications in 1977.

== Career ==
Rhodes was awarded the New York State Cash Scholarship and a Cornell University Tuition Scholarship and began studying mathematics at Cornell University only six years after coming to the United States, from 1919 to 1923. During her time at Cornell University she worked as a nurse's aid at Ithaca City Hospital. She was elected to the honorary organizations Phi Beta Kappa (1922) and Phi Kappa Phi (1923). She received her BA in mathematics in February, 1923 and her MA in September of the same year, graduating Phi Beta Kappa.

Ida Itzkowitz married Solomon Alhadef Rhodes on 20 September 1922 in Bronx, New York City, and became known as Ida Rhodes. The couple made a Declaration of Intention to become a citizen of the United States on 17 June 1924; however, they were divorced by 1940.

Rhodes had her first encounter with Albert Einstein in 1922 and encountered him again in 1936 at Princeton, where a group of mathematicians traveled to spend the weekend in informal seminars. She later studied at Columbia University in 1930–31. She held numerous positions involving mathematical computations before she joined the Mathematical Tables Project in 1940, where she worked under Gertrude Blanch, whom she would later credit as her mentor.

Ida Rhodes was a pioneer in the analysis of systems of programming, and with Betty Holberton designed the C-10 programming language in the early 1950s for the UNIVAC I. She also designed the original computer used for the Social Security Administration. In 1949, the Department of Commerce awarded her a gold medal for "significant pioneering leadership and outstanding contributions to the scientific progress of the Nation in the functional design and the application of electronic digital computing equipment".

In 1953, Rhodes wrote for the Mathematical Tables and Other Aids to Computation, Vol. 7, No. 42 (Apr., 1953). She provided a summary of an article from a prior issue and provided feedback on what readers can take from the article. Focusing on removing the human element and error along with the advantages in time and space. She concluded that business can't expect savings until data random access "ha[s] been perfected."

Though she retired in 1964, Rhodes continued to consult for the Applied Mathematics Division of the National Bureau of Standards until 1971. Her work became much more widely known after her retirement, as she took the occasion to travel around the globe, lecturing and maintaining international correspondence. In 1976, the Department of Commerce presented her with a further Certificate of Appreciation on the 25th Anniversary of UNIVAC I, and then at the 1981 Computer Conference cited her a third time as a "UNIVAC I pioneer." She died in 1986.

In an unusual case of an old specialized algorithm still in use, and still credited to the original developer, in 1977 Rhodes was responsible for the "Jewish Holiday" algorithm used in calendar programs to this day. While at the National Bureau of Standards (now NIST), she also did original work in machine translation of natural languages.

== Sources ==
- National Institute of Standards and Technology virtual museum
- Blanch Anniversary Volume, February 21, 1967
- Charlene Morrow and Teri Peri (eds), Notable Women in Mathematics, Greenwood Press, 1998, pp. 180–85
