= Leioproctus chaetosus =

Scientific classification
- Kingdom: Animalia
- Phylum: Arthropoda
- Clade: Pancrustacea
- Class: Insecta
- Order: Hymenoptera
- Family: Colletidae
- Genus: Leioproctus
- Species: L. chaetosus

Binomial name
- Leioproctus chaetosus Batley, 2025

Species of bee

Leioproctus chaetosus, or Leioproctus (Exleycolletes) chaetosus, is a species of bee in the family Colletidae and subfamily Colletinae. It is endemic to Australia. It was described by entomologist Michael Batley in 2025.

== Etymology ==
The specific epithet chaetosus (Latinised Greek: "long hair") is an anatomical reference to the tufts on S8 of the male.

== Description ==
The holotype male body length is 9.3 mm, head width 2.8 mm; female body length 10 mm, head width 3.2 mm;. Integumental colouration is mainly black, with brown markings. The hair is white to brown.

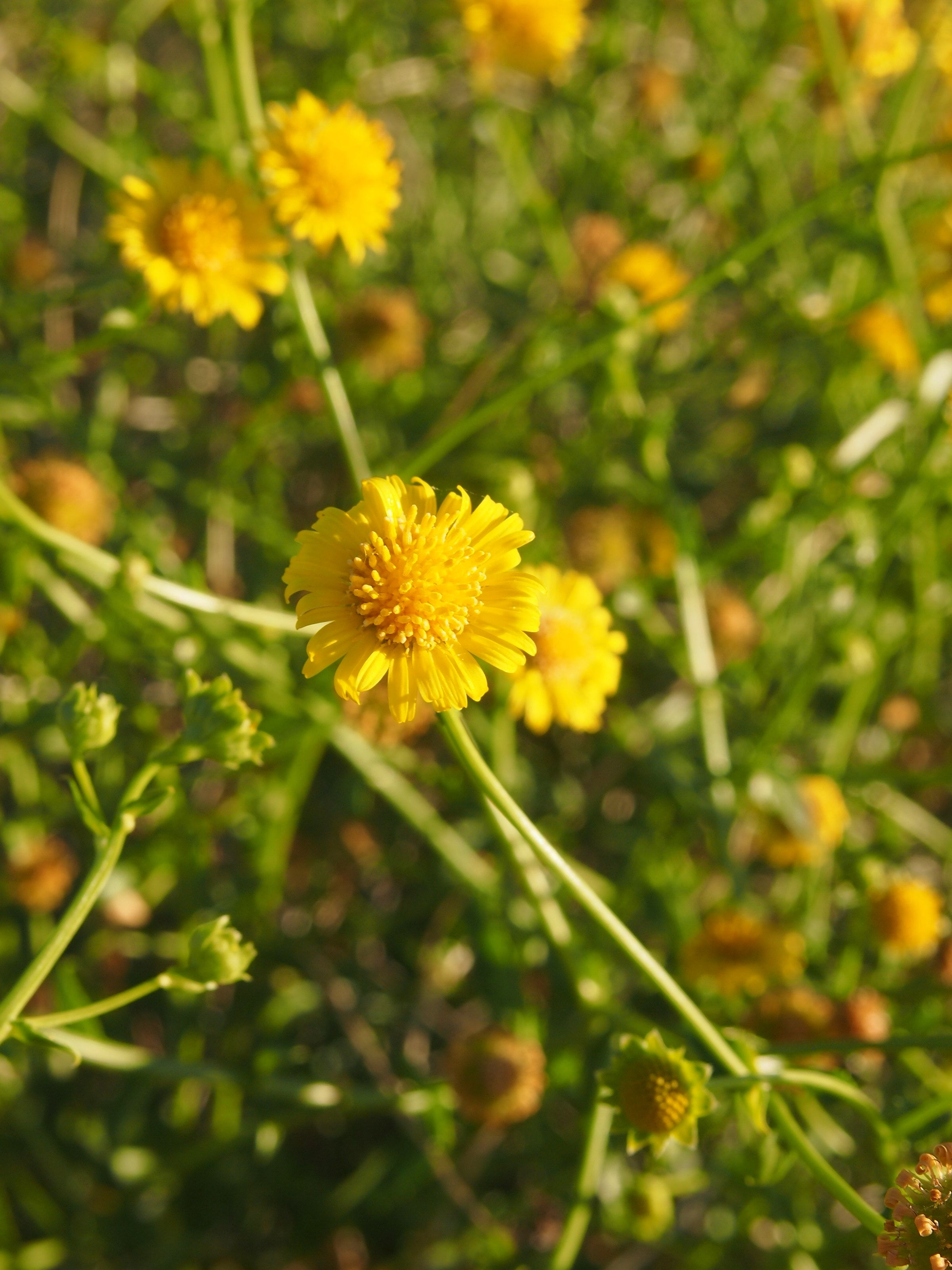
Flowers of Calotis erinacea

== Distribution and habitat ==
The species occurs in inland eastern Australia. The type locality is 22 km south of Charleville, Queensland. It has also been recorded from Hattah-Kulkyne National Park in north-western Victoria.

== Behaviour ==
The adults are flying mellivores. Flowering plants visited by the bees include Calotis erinacea.

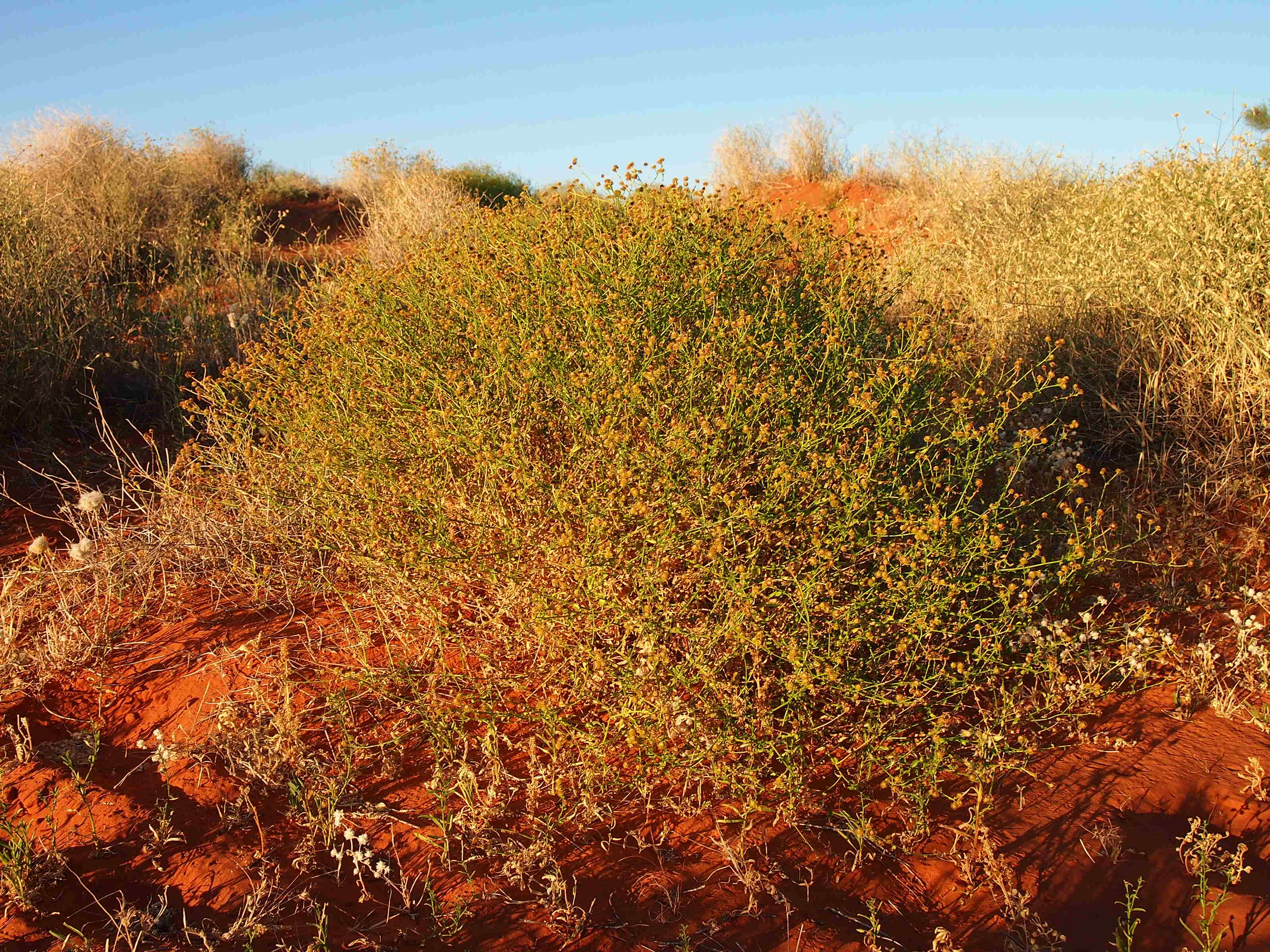
Calotis erinacea (tangled burr-daisy), a forage plant of the bees
