= Enchiridion =

An enchiridion or encheiridion (Ancient Greek: ἐγχειρίδιον, enkheirídion) is a small manual or handbook.

It can refer more specifically to:

- Enchiridion of Epictetus, a short manual of Stoic ethical advice
- Enchiridion de Metris, an ancient treatise on poetic meters by the Greek grammarian Hephaestion
- Enchiridion of Pomponius, a 2nd-century collection of Roman law
- Enchiridion on Faith, Hope and Love by Augustine of Hippo, a compact treatise on Christian piety (420)
- Enchiridion of Byrhtferth (fl. 1000)
- Enchiridion Militis Christiani of Erasmus (1501)
- Erfurt Enchiridion, an early Lutheran hymnal (1524)
- The Third Catechism (1561), one of the Old Prussian catechisms
- Enchiridion of Dirk Philips (1564)
- Enchiridion of Pope Leo (16th/17th c.)
- Enchiridion Symbolorum, Definitionum et Declarationum de Rebus Fidei et Morum (1854) a compendium on Catholic dogma
- Enchiridion Indulgentiarum, a Catholic manual on indulgences

== See also ==
- "The Enchiridion!" (2010), fifth episode of the first season of the animated television series Adventure Time
- The Enchiridion (Sun & Storm), an adventure for the role-playing game Sun & Storm
- Encheiridion, an orchid
