= Leioproctus ammophilus =

Scientific classification
- Kingdom: Animalia
- Phylum: Arthropoda
- Clade: Pancrustacea
- Class: Insecta
- Order: Hymenoptera
- Family: Colletidae
- Genus: Leioproctus
- Species: L. ammophilus

Binomial name
- Leioproctus ammophilus Batley, 2025

Species of bee

Leioproctus ammophilus, or Leioproctus (Leioproctus) ammophilus, is a species of bee in the family Colletidae and subfamily Colletinae. It is endemic to Australia. It was described by entomologist Michael Batley in 2025.

== Etymology ==
The specific epithet ammophilus (Greek: "sand lover") refers to the habitat at the collection sites.

== Description ==
The holotype male body length is 9.2 mm, head width 3.0 mm; a female paratype body length 9.8 mm, head width 3.1 mm. Integumental colouration is mainly black, with brown markings. The hair is white to brown.

== Distribution and habitat ==
The species occurs in south-eastern Australia. The type locality is the Hattah-Kulkyne National Park in north-western Victoria. It has also been recorded from 35 km south-west of Pinnaroo, South Australia.

== Behaviour ==
The adults are flying mellivores. Flowering plants visited by the bees include Aotus subspinescens, as well as Dillwynia and Hibbertia species.
