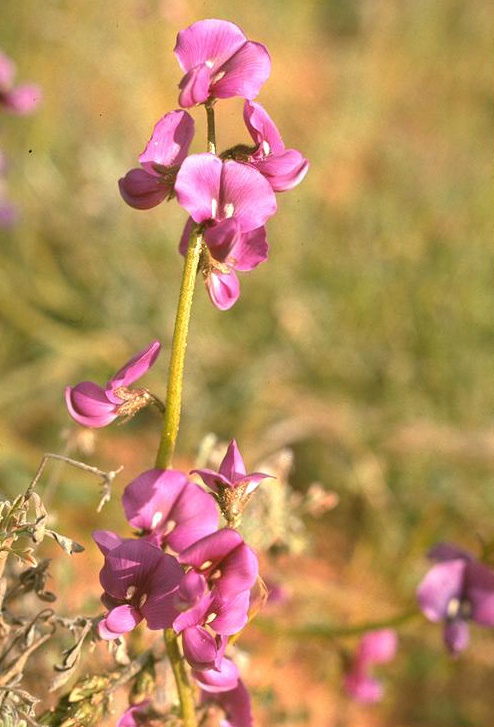
- In Hattah Lakes National Park

Scientific classification
- Kingdom: Plantae
- Clade: Tracheophytes
- Clade: Angiosperms
- Clade: Eudicots
- Clade: Rosids
- Order: Fabales
- Family: Fabaceae
- Subfamily: Faboideae
- Genus: Swainsona
- Species: S. oroboides

Binomial name
- Swainsona oroboides F.Muell. ex Benth.

Synonyms
- Swainsona oroboides F.Muell. ex Benth. subsp. oroboides; Swainsona oroboides F.Muell. ex Benth. var. oroboides; Swainsonia oroboides F.Muell. orth. var.

= Swainsona oroboides =

Species of flowering plants

Swainsona oroboides, commonly known as variable swainsona or kneed Darling pea, is a species of flowering plant in the family Fabaceae and is endemic to Australia. It is a prostrate or ascending perennial plant with imparipinnate leaves with 3 to 7 narrowly elliptic leaflets and racemes of 3 to about 16 purple flowers.

== Description ==
Swainsona oroboides is a prostrate or ascending perennial plant, that typically grows to a height of up to 15 cm (5.9 in) and has many stems. The leaves are imparipinnate, mostly 20–70 mm (0.79–2.76 in) long with 3 to 7 narrowly elliptic leaflets, the side leaflets 10–24 mm (0.39–0.94 in) long and 2–5 mm (0.079–0.197 in) wide with stipules mostly 3–5 mm (0.12–0.20 in) long at the base of the petioles. The flowers are purple, arranged in racemes of 3 to about 16, 50–150 mm (2.0–5.9 in) long, on a peduncle 0.5–1.5 mm (0.020–0.059 in) long. The sepals are joined at the base to form a tube about 1.5 mm (0.059 in) long, with lobes a little to much longer than the tube. The standard petal is 7–10 mm (0.28–0.39 in) long and 8–12 mm (0.31–0.47 in) wide, the wings about 5–8 mm (0.20–0.31 in) long and the keel about 6–10 mm (0.24–0.39 in) long and 2.5–3.0 mm (0.098–0.118 in) deep. Flowering occurs from June to September, and the fruit is a broadly oblong pod about 10 mm (0.39 in) long on a stalk about 1 mm (0.039 in) long, with the remains of the strongly curved style 3–4 mm (0.12–0.16 in) long.

== Taxonomy and naming ==
Swainsona oroboides was first formally described in 1864 by George Bentham in Flora Australiensis from an unpublished description by Ferdinand von Mueller. The specific epithet (oroboides) means "Orobus-like". (Orobus is now known as Lathyrus.)

== Distribution ==
This species of swainsona is widespread in inland areas of Western Australia, South Australia, New South Wales and southern parts of the Northern Territory and Queensland, where it usually grows on open plains and eucalypt or mulga woodland.
