= Incomplete Bessel K function/generalized incomplete gamma function =

Some mathematicians defined this type incomplete-version of Bessel function or this type generalized-version of incomplete gamma function:

$$K_v(x,y)=\int_1^\infty\frac{e^{-xt-\frac{y}{t}}}{t^{v+1}}~dt$$
$$\gamma(\alpha,x;b)=\int_0^xt^{\alpha-1}e^{-t-\frac{b}{t}}~dt$$
$$\Gamma(\alpha,x;b)=\int_x^\infty t^{\alpha-1}e^{-t-\frac{b}{t}}~dt$$

== Properties ==
$$K_v(x,y)=x^v\Gamma(-v,x;xy)$$
$$K_v(x,y)+K_{-v}(y,x)=\frac{2x^\frac{v}{2}}{y^\frac{v}{2}}K_v(2\sqrt{xy})$$
$$\gamma(\alpha,x;0)=\gamma(\alpha,x)$$
$$\Gamma(\alpha,x;0)=\Gamma(\alpha,x)$$
$$\gamma(\alpha,x;b)+\Gamma(\alpha,x;b)=2b^\frac{\alpha}{2}K_\alpha(2\sqrt b)$$

One advantage of defining this version of incomplete Bessel function $K_v(x,y)$ is that for example even the associated Anger–Weber function defined in the Digital Library of Mathematical Functions is related to it:

$$\mathbf{A}_\nu(z)=\frac{1}{\pi}\int_0^\infty e^{-\nu t-z\sinh t}~dt=\frac{1}{\pi}\int_0^\infty e^{-(\nu+1)t-\frac{ze^t}{2}+\frac{z}{2e^t}}~d(e^t)=\frac{1}{\pi}\int_1^\infty\frac{e^{-\frac{zt}{2}+\frac{z}{2t}}}{t^{\nu+1}}~dt=\frac{1}{\pi}K_\nu\left(\frac{z}{2},-\frac{z}{2}\right)$$

=== Recurrence relations ===
$K_v(x,y)$ satisfy this recurrence relation:

$$xK_{v-1}(x,y)+vK_v(x,y)-yK_{v+1}(x,y)=e^{-x-y}$$
