= Hattah-Kulkyne and Murray-Kulkyne Biosphere Reserve =

Australian nature reserve

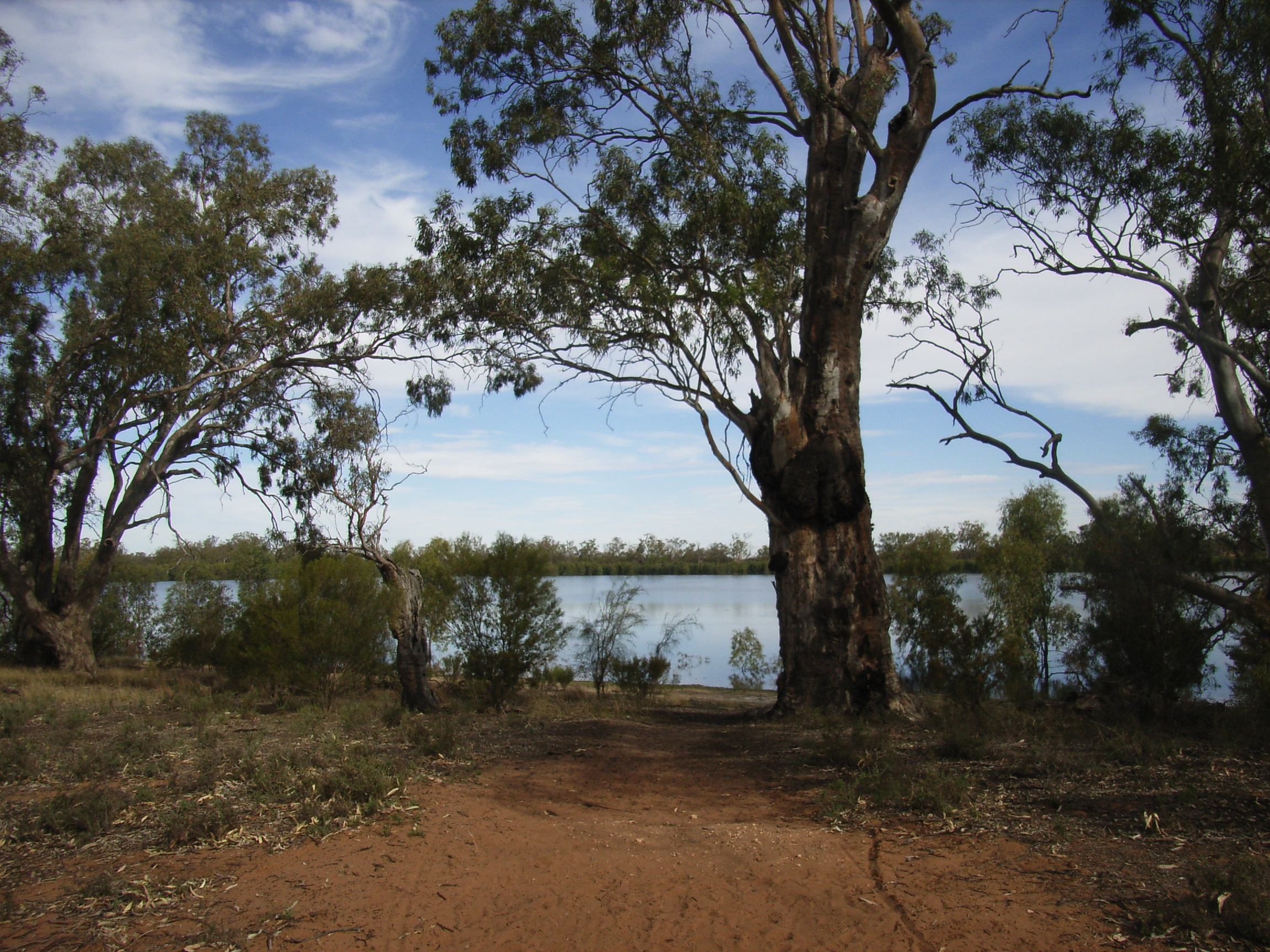
- Hattah-Kulkyne and Murray-Kulkyne Biosphere Reserve

- Location within Victoria
- Location: Victoria
- Nearest city: Mildura
- Coordinates: 34°21′5.2″S 142°19′48″E
- Area: 515.00 km^{2} (198.84 sq mi)
- Established: 1981
- Visitors: 99,000 (in 2016)
- Governing body: Parks Victoria

Hattah-Kulkyne and Murray-Kulkyne Biosphere Reserve is a biosphere reserve in the Australian state of Victoria located to the southern bank of the Murray River to the south-east of the city of Mildura on land occupied by the following protected areas - the Hattah-Kulkyne National Park and the Murray-Kulkyne Park.

The biosphere reserve was described by UNESCO in 2016 as:

The Hattah-Kulkyne and Murray-Kulkyne Biosphere Reserve is located in Southeast Australia. It comprises three main habitats: riveraise woodlands, savanna woodlands and saline shrublands. The Murray River flows through the reserve and is connected to several wetlands. However, due to the semi-arid climate it only fills intermittently with water. The main land formations are saline flats that contain shallow soils overlying gypsum, dune fields that contain relics of Pleistocence sand ridges, and floodplains that are formed of a quarterly alluvium.

== History ==
In 1915, a sanctuary was formed to protect the beauty of the Hattah lakes. Ornithologist Les Chandler in 1949, with the Reverend C. L. Lang, formed the Sunraysia Naturalists' Club (now the Sunraysia Naturalists' Research Trust) and was variously its President, Vice-president, Secretary, Treasurer and Editor. They agitated to have the Hattah-Kulkyne area declared a national park, which was achieved in 1960. The biosphere reserve was established in 1981 and is managed by Parks Victoria.

== See also ==
- List of biosphere reserves in Australia
