= Abramowitz and Stegun =

1964 mathematical reference work edited by M. Abramowitz and I. Stegun

Handbook of Mathematical Functions with Formulas, Graphs, and Mathematical Tables
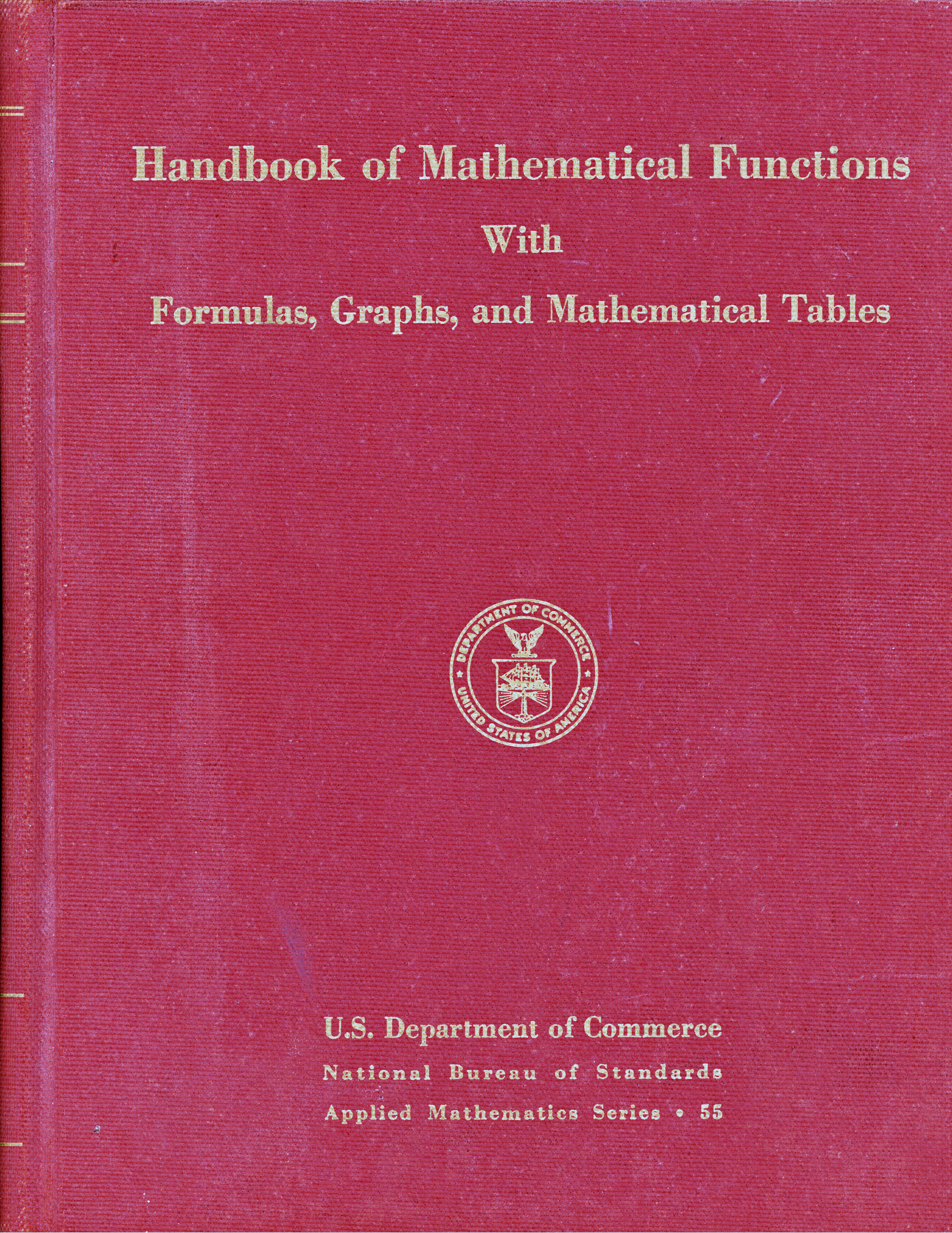
- Cover of the ninth printing, 1970
- Author: Milton Abramowitz and Irene Stegun
- Language: English
- Genre: Math
- Publisher: United States Department of Commerce, National Bureau of Standards (NBS)
- Publication date: 1964
- Publication place: United States
- ISBN: 0-486-61272-4
- OCLC: 18003605

Abramowitz and Stegun (AS) is the informal name of a 1964 mathematical reference work edited by Milton Abramowitz and Irene Stegun of the United States National Bureau of Standards (NBS), now the National Institute of Standards and Technology (NIST). Its full title is Handbook of Mathematical Functions with Formulas, Graphs, and Mathematical Tables. A digital successor to the Handbook was released as the "Digital Library of Mathematical Functions" (DLMF) on 11 May 2010, along with a printed version, the NIST Handbook of Mathematical Functions, published by Cambridge University Press.

== Overview ==
Since it was first published in 1964, the 1046-page Handbook has been one of the most comprehensive sources of information on special functions, containing definitions, identities, approximations, plots, and tables of values of numerous functions used in virtually all fields of applied mathematics. The notation used in the Handbook is the de facto standard for much of applied mathematics today.

At the time of its publication, the Handbook was an essential resource for practitioners. Nowadays, scientific calculators, numerical analysis software packages, and computer algebra systems have replaced the function tables, but the Handbook remains an important reference source. The foreword discusses a meeting in 1954 in which it was agreed that "the advent of high-speed computing equipment changed the task of table making but definitely did not remove the need for tables".

More than 1,000 pages long, the Handbook of Mathematical Functions was first published in 1964 and reprinted many times, with yet another reprint in 1999. Its influence on science and engineering is evidenced by its popularity. In fact, when New Scientist magazine recently asked some of the world's leading scientists what single book they would want if stranded on a desert island, one distinguished British physicist said he would take the Handbook. The Handbook is likely the most widely distributed and most cited NIST technical publication of all time. Government sales exceed 150,000 copies, and an estimated three times as many have been reprinted and sold by commercial publishers since 1965. During the mid-1990s, the book was cited every 1.5 hours of each working day. And its influence will persist as it is currently being updated in digital format by NIST.

— NIST

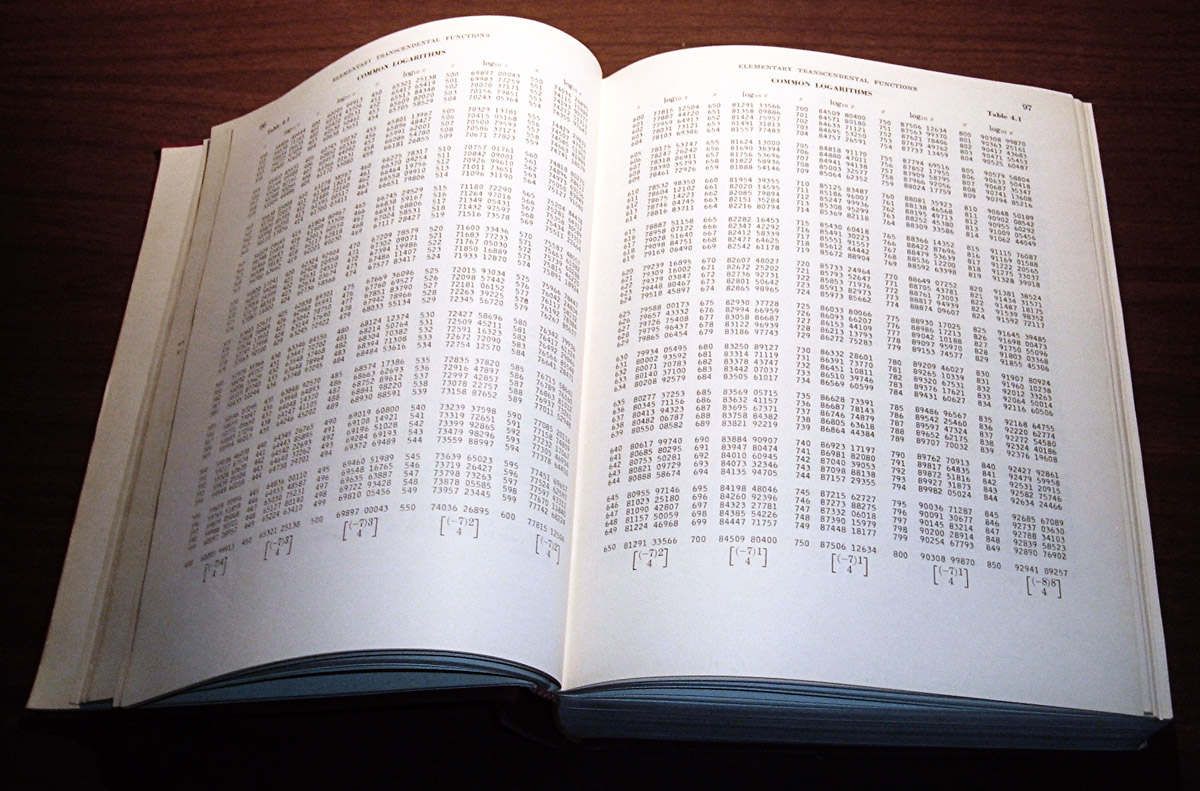
Page 97 showing part of a table of common logarithms

The chapters are:

1. Mathematical Constants
2. Physical Constants and Conversion Factors
3. Elementary Analytical Methods
4. Elementary Transcendental Functions
5. Exponential Integral and Related Functions
6. Gamma Function and Related Functions
7. Error Function and Fresnel Integrals
8. Legendre Functions
9. Bessel Functions of Integral Order
10. Bessel Functions of Fractional Order
11. Integrals of Bessel Functions
12. Struve Functions and Related Functions
13. Confluent Hypergeometric Functions
14. Coulomb Wave Functions
15. Hypergeometric Functions
16. Jacobian Elliptic Functions and Theta Functions
17. Elliptic Integrals
18. Weierstrass Elliptic and Related Functions
19. Parabolic Cylinder Functions
20. Mathieu Functions
21. Spheroidal Wave Functions
22. Orthogonal Polynomials
23. Bernoulli and Euler Polynomials, Riemann Zeta Function
24. Combinatorial Analysis
25. Numerical Interpolation, Differentiation, and Integration
26. Probability Functions
27. Miscellaneous Functions
28. Scales of Notation
29. Laplace Transforms

== Editions ==
Because the Handbook is the work of U.S. federal government employees acting in their official capacity, it is not protected by copyright in the United States. While it could be ordered from the Government Printing Office, it has also been reprinted by commercial publishers, most notably Dover Publications (ISBN 0-486-61272-4), and can be legally viewed on and downloaded from the web.

While there was only one edition of the work, it went through many print runs including a growing number of corrections.

Original NBS edition:

- 1st printing: June 1964; errata: (Note: Up to the tenth printing of the original NBS edition in December 1972, corrections were incorporated on pages 2–3, 6–8, 10, 15, 19–20, 25, 76, 85, 91, 102, 187, 189–197, 218, 223, 225, 233, 250, 255, 260–263, 268, 271–273, 292, 302, 328, 332, 333–337, 362, 365, 415, 423, 438–440, 443, 445, 447, 449, 451, 484, 498, 505–506, 509–510, 543, 556, 558, 562, 571, 595, 599, 600, 722–723, 739, 742, 744, 746, 752, 756, 760–765, 774, 777–785, 790, 797, 801, 822–823, 832, 835, 844, 886–889, 897, 914, 915, 920, 930–931, 936, 940–941, 944–950, 953, 960, 963, 989–990, 1010 and 1026. The Dover Publications paperback edition (SBN 486612724) cover names the second editor as "Irene A. Segun" instead of Stegun. The ninth reprint edition by Dover incorporates additional corrections on pages 18, 79, 80, 82, 408, 450, 786, 825 and 934. Unresolved errata include:)
- 2nd printing with corrections: November 1964; errata:
- 3rd printing with corrections: March 1965; errata:
- 4th printing with corrections: December 1965; errata:
- 5th printing with corrections: August 1966
- 6th printing with corrections: November 1967
- 7th printing with corrections: May 1968
- 8th printing with corrections: 1969
- 9th printing with corrections: November 1970
- 10th printing with corrections: December 1972

Reprint edition by Dover Publications:

- 1st printing: 1965
- ?
- 9th printing with additional corrections (based on 10th printing of NBS edition with corrections)

== Related projects ==
Michael Danos and Johann Rafelski edited the Pocketbook of Mathematical Functions, published by Verlag Harri Deutsch in 1984. The book is an abridged version of Abramowitz's and Stegun's Handbook, retaining most of the formulas (except for the first and the two last original chapters, which were dropped), but reducing the numerical tables to a minimum, which, by this time, could be easily calculated with scientific pocket calculators. The references were removed as well. Most known errata were incorporated, the physical constants updated and the now-first chapter saw some slight enlargement compared to the former second chapter. The numbering of formulas was kept for easier cross-reference.

A digital successor to the Handbook, long under development at NIST, was released as the “Digital Library of Mathematical Functions” (DLMF) on 11 May 2010, along with a printed version, the NIST Handbook of Mathematical Functions, published by Cambridge University Press.

== See also ==
- Mathematical Tables Project, a 1938–1948 Works Progress Administration (WPA) project to calculate mathematical tables, including those later used in Abramowitz and Stegun's Handbook of Mathematical Functions
- Bateman Manuscript Project
- Gradshteyn and Ryzhik, a table of integrals.
- Digital Library of Mathematical Functions (DLMF), from the National Institute of Standards and Technology (NIST), is intended to be a replacement for Abramowitz and Stegun's Handbook of Mathematical Functions
- Prudnikov, Brychkov and Marichev (PBM)
- Bronshtein and Semendyayev (BS)
- Jahnke and Emde (JE)
- Magnus and Oberhettinger (MO)
- CRC Standard Mathematical Tables (CRC)
- MAOL, a Finnish handbook for science
- BINAS, a Dutch science handbook
- Numerical analysis
- Rubber book, a Handbook of Chemistry & Physics
- Reference book
- Handbook
- Philip J. Davis, author of the Gamma function section and other sections of the book
- Louis Melville Milne-Thomson, author of the book chapters on elliptic integrals and Jacobi elliptic functions
- Boole's rule, a mathematical rule of integration sometimes known as Bode's rule, due to a typo in Abramowitz and Stegun (1972, p. 886) that was subsequently propagated.
- On-Line Encyclopedia of Integer Sequences
