= Mathematical Tables Project =

The Mathematical Tables Project was one of the largest and most sophisticated computing organizations that operated prior to the invention of the digital electronic computer. Begun in the United States in 1938 as a project of the Works Progress Administration (WPA), it employed 450 clerks to tabulate higher mathematical functions, such as exponential functions, logarithms, and trigonometric functions. These tables were eventually published in a 28-volume set by Columbia University Press.

== History ==
The group was led by a group of mathematicians and physicists, most of whom had been unable to find professional work during the Great Depression. The mathematical leader was Gertrude Blanch, who had just finished her doctorate in mathematics at Cornell University. She had been unable to find a university position and was working at a photographic company before joining the project.

The administrative director was Arnold Lowan, who had a degree in physics from Columbia University and had spent a year at the Institute for Advanced Study in Princeton University before returning to New York without a job. Perhaps the most accomplished mathematician to be associated with the group was Cornelius Lanczos, who had once served as an assistant to Albert Einstein. He spent a year with the project and organized seminars on computation and applied mathematics at the project's office in Lower Manhattan.

In addition to computing tables of mathematical functions, the project did large computations for sciences, including the physicist Hans Bethe, and did calculations for a variety of war projects, including tables for the LORAN navigation system, tables for microwave radar, bombing tables, and shock wave propagation tables.

The Mathematical Tables Project survived the termination of the WPA in 1943 and continued to operate in New York until 1948. At that point, roughly 25 members of the group moved to Washington, D.C., to become the Computation Laboratory of the National Bureau of Standards, now the National Institute of Standards and Technology. Blanch moved to Los Angeles to lead the computing office of the Institute for Numerical Analysis at UCLA and Arnold Lowan joined the faculty of Yeshiva University in New York. The greatest legacy of the project is the Handbook of Mathematical Functions, which was published 16 years after the group disbanded. Edited by two veterans of the project, Milton Abramowitz and Irene Stegun, it became a widely circulated mathematical and scientific reference.
