= Leslie Gordon Chandler =

Australian ornithologist and photographer (1888–1980)

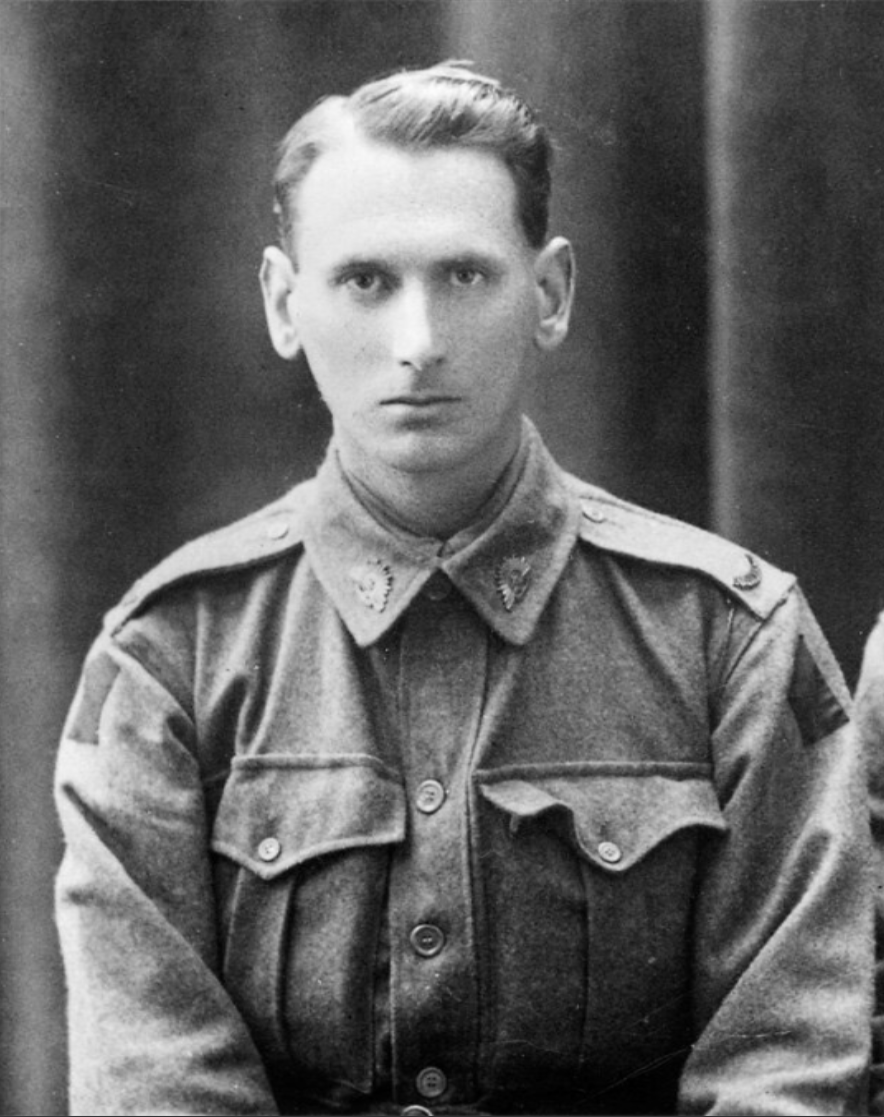
- Chandler at age 27 (c. 1915)
- Born: January 11, 1888; Malvern, Victoria, Australia
- Died: January 25, 1980 (aged 92); Red Cliffs, Victoria
- Known for: involvement with Royal Australasian Ornithologists Union, instrumental in the establishment of the Hattah-Kulkyne National Park
- Spouse: Ivy Henshall (m. 1931)
- Scientific career
- Fields: Ornithology, conservation

Leslie Gordon Chandler (1888–1980) was an Australian jeweller, vigneron, bird photographer, writer and speaker on natural history, and ornithologist. He became a member of the Royal Australasian Ornithologists Union (RAOU) in 1911 and was Press Correspondent for the RAOU 1914-1916 and again in 1920, war service and disability intervening. From 1920 he was based at Red Cliffs in the Victorian Mallee region. He was instrumental in the establishment of the Hattah-Kulkyne National Park there.

== Early life ==
Leslie Chandler (always known as 'Les') was born on January 11, 1888, in the Melbourne suburb of Malvern, fourth child of English-born parents Robert Charles Chandler and Ellen, née Mead(e)s, moving with his family to The Basin in the Dandenong Ranges where he was schooled locally. Later attending Bayswater State School, his love of nature was inspired as he walked nearly 5 kilometres (3.1 mi) each day to school through the towering forests of the Dandenong Ranges on the outskirts of Melbourne, often making long detours to observe.

== Ornithology and photography ==
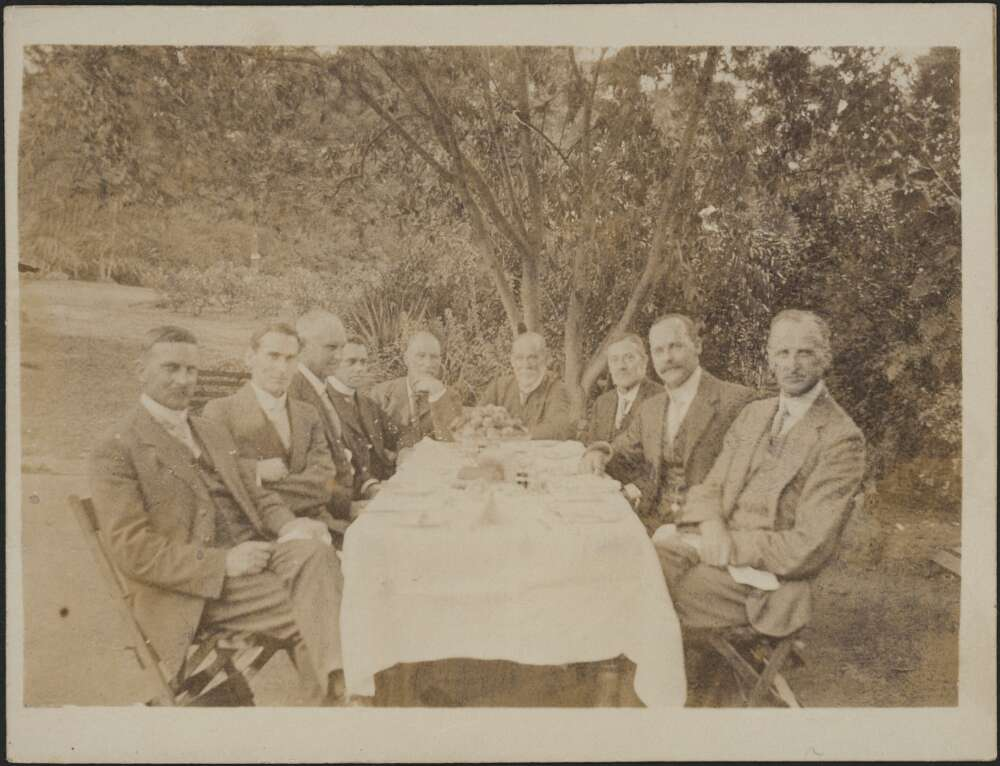
Meeting of Royal Australasian Ornithologists Union (RAOU) with members Dr J. Leach, Les Chandler, C. McLennan, C. Barrett, A.J. Campbell, Dudley Le Souef, T. Tregallas, Z. Gray, Gregory Mathews March 10, 1914

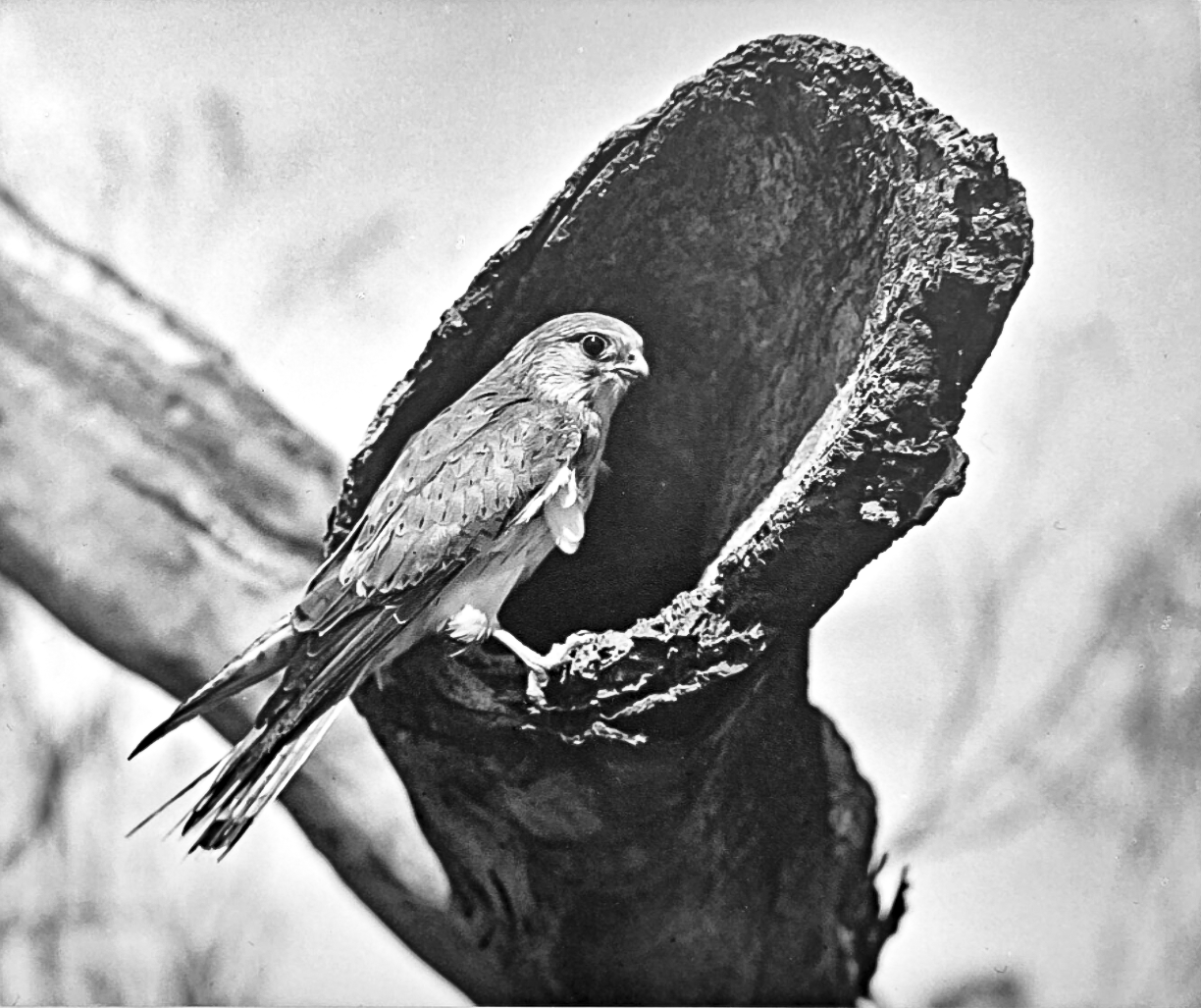
L. Chandler (n.d.) Kestrel at Tree Hollow in the Mallee

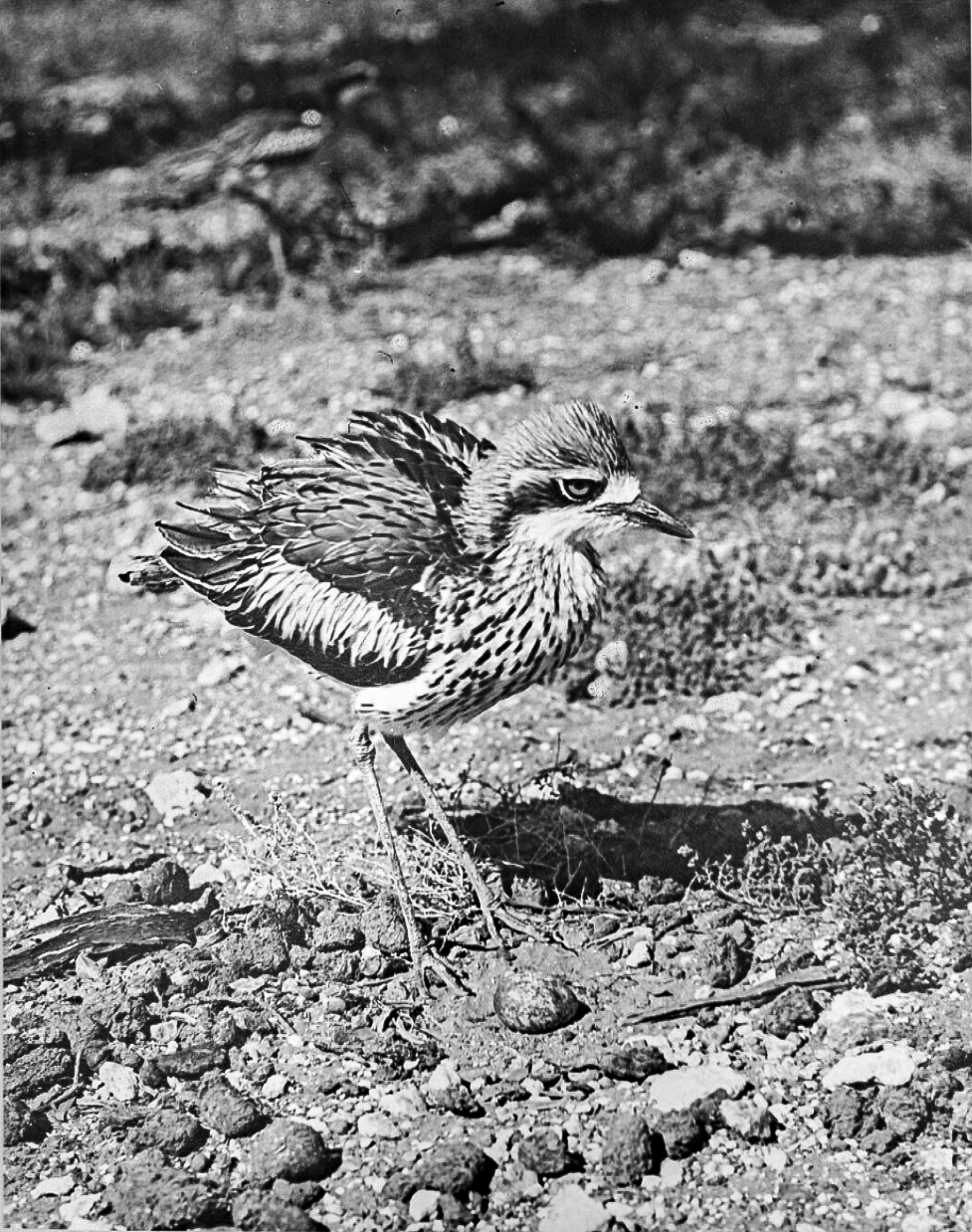
L. Chandler (n.d.) Southern Stone Curlew at nest with egg

Chandler was apprenticed at fifteen years old to a city jeweller and following his greatest interest began to give nature studies presentations in schools from age eighteen. By 1907 he had taken up bird photography, joining the Bird Observers' Club in 1908, of which he was once secretary, the Royal Australasian Ornithologists' Union in 1911 on which he served as Press Secretary, and the Field Naturalists' Club of Victoria in 1914. His experience as an apprentice jeweler enabled his production of hundreds of harmless bands for the Bird Observers Club and Australasian Ornithologists Union to track birds in the first of such projects in Australia; of Short-tailed Shearwaters on Phillip Island and white-faced storm petrels on Mud Islands during 1912–14.

Staying with Charles Thompson, the owner of Kulkyne Station he came to love the Mallee district, where he was later to settle.

== Writer on natural history ==
Periodicals including The Emu, Walkabout, Riverlander, Wild Life, Wildlife in Australia, Victorian Naturalist, Australasian Photo-Review, The School Magazine, and Victorian School-paper published Chandler's copious writings and pictures, as did newspapers The Age, Australasian, Argus, Leader, and as 'Oriole' he was nature correspondent for the Sunraysia Daily. Whenever he had the time he would spend it in the field, sometimes for several days at a time, to make his observations, employing portable bird hides of hessian, and often climbing high into trees to get his pictures.

His texts are often cited in current ornithological papers, with Woinarski and Recher for example noting the value of his observations, remarking that "Weather conditions following fire also influence bird responses, with Chandler (1973) noting that drought post-fire may accentuate the fire impact. Chandler's observation is astute and it is difficult to separate the effects of drought from that of fire as most wildfires tend to occur during dry periods"

== WW1 service ==
Chandler signed up with the Australian Imperial Force on 8 July 1915, taking his camera with him to the Western Front, despite photography there being banned. Bayonet training at Seymour Army Camp persuaded him that "he couldn't kill anybody, just couldn't face that," as his daughter Mary remembered. He volunteered instead as a stretcher-bearer in the 15th Field Ambulance, in which he served on the Western Front, in Egypt, and Belgium. Despite photography being an activity forbidden to Australian soldiers, Chandler recorded lighter moments, the French people and what was left of the natural landscape and used a bulb release to include himself in the picture.

Gassed at Villers-Bretonneux, France, in April 1918, he was invalided to the United Kingdom where he managed to photograph views of the English countryside. Arriving in Melbourne in January 1919 he was discharged medically unfit on 25 July, too ill to resume his trade as a jeweler. While convalescing he founded and led excursions of the Nature Photographers' Club of Australia in 1919 which contributed and shared their work via a portfolio circulated by mail.

== Soldier-settler in the Mallee ==
To continue his recovery, Chandler went 'on holiday' in the Mallee, recording his impressions in his diary, from which he quotes in a 1947 Walkabout article on the settlement of Red Cliffs, near Mildura:

The writer arrived at Red Cliffs in February, 1921, to take up work with a clearing gang and to gain initial knowledge in the surrounding, older settlements of vineyard work, before applying for a block. It was a scorching day of 115 degrees in the shade, with red dust flying, and on the previous day the heat had reached 119 degrees [48°C].

As a soldier-settler under the Victorian Government's "Act to make provision for the Settlement of Discharged Soldiers on the Land and for other purposes" of 22 October 1917, Chandler was granted an allotment of Crown Land of Mallee scrub which he cleared and fenced to create a vineyard for the production of dried sultana grapes and an orchard. A government loan of £500 (worth about $35,000.00 in 2021) on which interest was to be paid, provided the initial capital for returned servicemen, though the land they farmed was what was left over in a largely settled Victoria. On repayment of the initial investment, a further £500 could be granted provided the farming was successful, especially tough in the Mallee where success came only where there was irrigation.

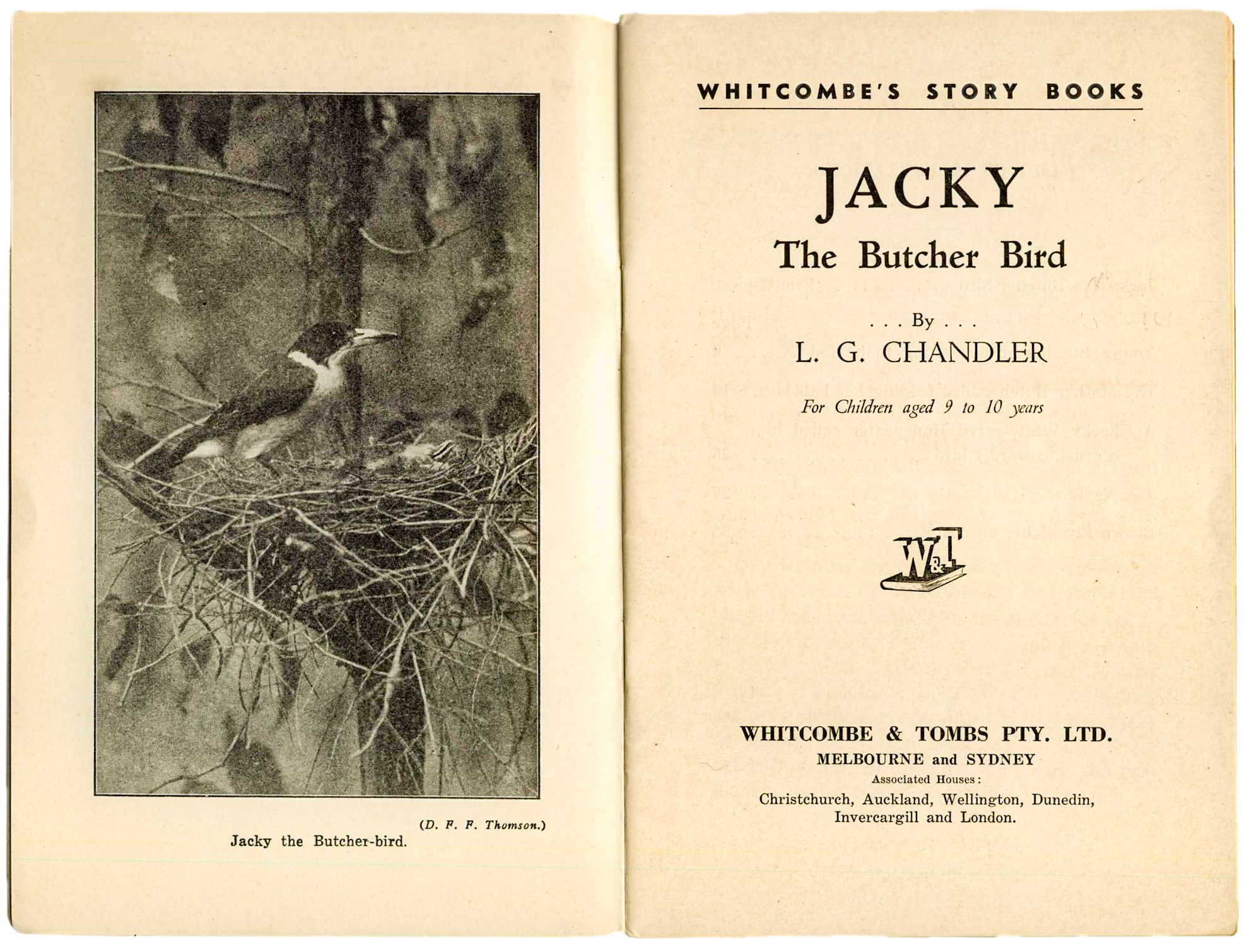
Opening pages of the book "Jacky the Butcher Bird". Photograph and text; Les Chandler

In addition to working to establishing his vineyard and a rudimentary canvas-roofed dwelling, Chandler wrote and photographed for Bush Charms, and Jacky the Butcher-Bird, both published 1922 and very early examples of children's books illustrated with photographs. The latter was reviewed in Table Talk, and The Queenslander notes that "Messrs. Whitcombe and Tombs, Ltd. have published a really choice selection of Australian nature story readers, including..."Jacky, the Butcher Bird," by L. G. Chandler...all thoroughly tested Australian stories, as Australian as the gum tree, and the cheap, well-printed re print brings them within the reach of everybody."

In addition to making photographs many of his activities, often making self-portraits with a bulb release, from 1900 Chandler kept a life-long diary in shorthand. There, and in articles he wrote, he expresses sympathy for the plight of indigenous peoples of the region in which he settled; "In those early days before the white man came, the blacks little thought that their hunting-grounds that stretched away from the river into the forests of pine, belar, mallee-gums, sugar-wood and other vegetation, would be taken from them and one day cleared...". He had come to love the Mallee before the war, being guided around it by aboriginal princess Mary Woorlong (1879-1942) a Latji Latji or Muthi Muthi woman and daughter of King Wyrlong, a Muthi Muthi from the Euston area, descendants of Mungo Man, and who worked as a domestic servant. He learned much from her and made her portrait, and after her death was instrumental in marking her grave at Mildura Cemetery with a headstone. His 1935 Walkabout article details evidence of Aboriginal occupation in north-west Victoria in kitchen-middens, and trees from which canoes, coolamons and shields have been cut and the method used to trap codfish under trees.

== Conservationist ==
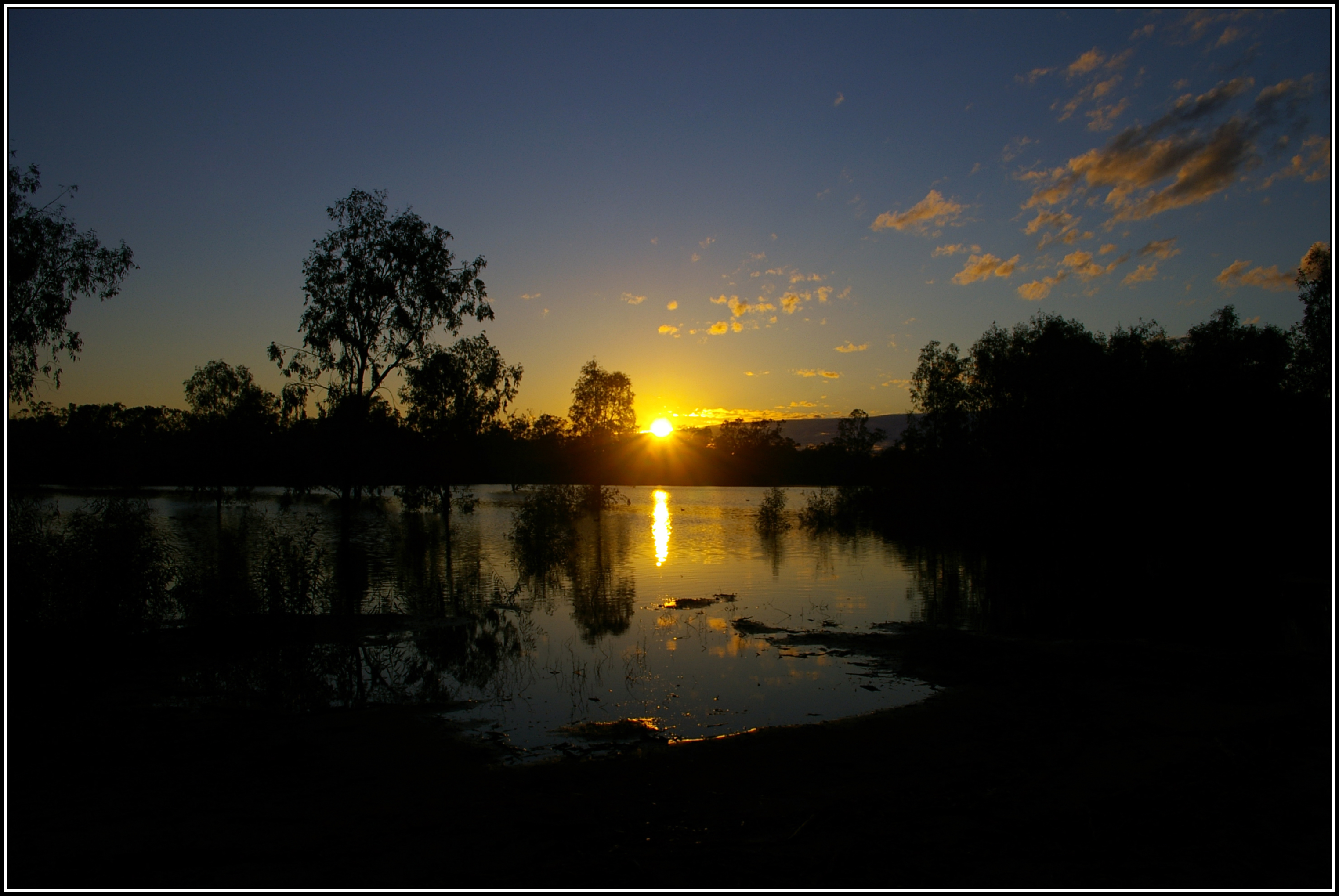
Peter Neaum (n.d.) Sunrise over Lake Mournpall, Hattah-Kulkyne National Park.

Naturalists Donald Macdonald and Charles Barrett, and later his work with E. Brooke Nicholls and bird photographer Arthur Mattingley, influenced Chandler. He was a foundation member of the Mildura Historical Society in 1949 and, with the late Reverend C. L. Lang, formed the Sunraysia Naturalists' Club (now the Sunraysia Naturalists' Research Trust) being variously its president, Vice-president, Secretary, Treasurer and Editor. They agitated to have the Hattah-Kulkyne area declared a National Park, with success coming in 1960.

== Personal life ==
Among Chandler's friends were poet C. J. Dennis, literary patron Jack Moir, cartoonist Hal Gye, sculptor Web Gilbert and painter Tom Roberts.

He married Ivy Henshall at St Andrew's Presbyterian Church, Mordialloc, Victoria, 10 September 1931 and their daughter Mary was born in 1937. Mary Chandler, who died 2020, was an historian and writer whose publications include her edited volume of her father's letters Dear homefolks : letters written by L.G. Chandler during the First World War and of chronicles of their home town, Against the odds : the story of the Red Cliffs settlement, and of environmental history in Tribal lands to national park, with pictures by her father, on the Hattah/Kulkyne National Park.

Chandler sold his vineyard in 1956 and moved to Red Cliffs where he died on 25 January 1980.

== Awards ==
- 1950 Australasian Photo-Review Recognition Medal
- 1961 Honorary Life Membership Royal Australasian Ornithologists Union
- Honorary Life Member, Sunraysia Naturalists' Research Trust

== Publications ==
=== Books ===
- Chandler, L. G. (Les G.); Chandler, Mary J., (compiler.) (1988), Dear homefolks : letters written by L.G. Chandler during the First World War, M. Chandler, ISBN 978-0-9595459-2-0
- Chandler, Mary J; Chandler, L. G. (Les G.), 1888-1980 (1980), Tribal lands to national park, M.J. Chandler, ISBN 978-0-9595459-1-3
- Chandler, L. G. (Les G.); Barrett, Charles, 1879-1959 (1923), Bush charms, Whitcombe & Tombs
- Chandler, L. G. (Les G.); Whitcombe & Tombs (1923), Jacky, the butcher bird, Whitcombe & Tombs
- Chandler, Mary J; Chandler, L. G. (Les G.), 1888-1980 (1985), Condah Mission : from half-caste to outcast

=== Journal articles ===
Chandler published hundreds of articles and photographs, in addition to his books.

- L.G. Chandler (1 October 1910), "Cuckoo notes", Emu, 10 (2), CSIRO PUBLISHING: 134, Bibcode:1910EmuAO..10..134C, doi:10.1071/MU910134b, ISSN 1448-5540
- Chandler, L. G. (26 January 1920), "Nature on a Murray River Sandhill (26 January 1920)", The Lone Hand ((26 January 1920)), W. McLeod]
- Chandler, L. G. (14 August 1920), "The Camera in the Bush (14 August 1920)", Australasian Photo-Review, 27 (8), Baker & Rouse
- Chandler, L. G. (15 December 1920), "Nature Photography (15 December 1920)", Australasian Photo-Review, 27 (12), Baker & Rouse
- Chandler, L. G. (15 June 1922), "Bird Photography. When and Where to Look for Subjects. (15 June 1922)", Australasian Photo-Review, 29 (6), Baker & Rouse
- Chandler, L. G. (2 September 1925), "The Birds' Drinking Tin. (2 September 1925)", The School Magazine of Literature for Our Boys and Girls, 10 (8 Part 2 Class 4), New South Wales. Department of Education
- Chandler, L. G. (15 October 1927), "The Photography of Reptiles (15 October 1927)", Australasian Photo-Review, 34 (10), Baker & Rouse
- Chandler, L. G. (30 October 1928), "Wasps (30 October 1928)", The Australian Woman's Mirror, 4 (49), The Bulletin Newspaper
- Chandler, L. G. (16 July 1928), "Rare Photographs in Birdland (16 July 1928)", Australasian Photo-Review, 35 (7), Baker & Rouse
- Chandler L. G. (1 May 1935), "In the Victorian Mallee (1 May 1935)", Walkabout, 1 (7), Australian National Travel Association, ISSN 0043-0064
- Chandler, L. G. (1 October 1941), "Notes on Bird Photography (1 October 1941)", Australasian Photo-Review, 48 (10), Baker & Rouse
- Chandler, L. G. (1 July 1944), "Illustrating Photography in the Vineyard L. G. Chandler (1 July 1944)", Australasian Photo-Review, 51 (7), Baker & RouseChandler L. G. (1 October 1944), "Some Mallee Birds of Prey (1 October 1944)", Walkabout, 10 (12), Australian National Travel Association, ISSN 0043-0064
- Chandler, L. G. (1 October 1945), "Photographing a Mallee Fowl (1 October 1945)", Australasian Photo-Review, 52 (10), Baker & Rouse
- Chandler L. G. (1 May 1945), "A Gallery of Self-Portraits (1 May 1945)", Australasian Photo-Review, 52 (5), Baker & Rouse
- Chandler L. G. (1 November 1945), "A Portfolio of Bird Studies (1 November 1945)", Australasian Photo-Review, 52 (11 and 12), Baker & RouseChandler, L. G. (1 October 1946), "Bird Photography in the Tree Tops (1 October 1946)", Australasian Photo-Review, 53 (10), Baker & Rouse
- Chandler L. G. (1 December 1946), "The Straited Grass-Wren (1 December 1946)", Walkabout, 13 (2), Australian National Travel Association, ISSN 0043-0064
- Chandler L. G. (1 January 1947), "Red Cliffs (1 January 1947)", Walkabout, 13 (3), Australian National Travel Association, ISSN 0043-0064
- Chandler, L. G. (1 March 1948), "Nature Photography for Women (1 March 1948)", Australasian Photo-Review, 55 (3), Baker & Rouse
- Chandler, L. G. (1 September 1949), "In Kulkyne National Forest (1 September 1949)", Australasian Photo-Review, 56 (9), Baker & Rouse
- Chandler L. G. (1 February 1950), "The Stone-Curlew (1 February 1950)", Walkabout, 16 (2), Australian National Travel Association, ISSN 0043-0064Chandler L. G. (1 July 1950), "A Study of a Young Kestrel (1 July 1950)", Australasian Photo-Review, 57 (7), Baker & Rouse
- Chandler L. G. (1 April 1951), "The Budgerygah (Melopsittacus undulatus) (1 April 1951)", Walkabout, 17 (4), Australian National Travel Association, ISSN 0043-0064
- Chandler, L. G. (Les G.) (1951), Last of her tribe
- Chandler L. G. (1 January 1952), "Victorian Cuckoo-Shrike (1 January 1952)", Walkabout, 18 (1), Australian National Travel Association, ISSN 0043-0064
- Chandler L. G. (1 October 1952), "The Australasian Photo-Review (1 October 1952)", Australasian Photo-Review, 59 (10), Baker & Rouse
- Chandler L. G. (1 December 1953), "Some Victorian Pigeons (1 December 1953)", Walkabout, 19 (12), Australian National Travel Association, ISSN 0043-0064
- Chandler L. G. (1 July 1954), "Three Victorian Fantails (1 July 1954)", Walkabout, 20 (7), Australian National Travel Association, ISSN 0043-0064
- Chandler L. G. (1 September 1955), "The Mallee-Fowl (Leipoa Ocellata) (1 September 1955)", Walkabout, 21 (9), Australian National Travel Association, ISSN 0043-0064
- Chandler L. G. (1 December 1957), "The "Happy Family" Bird (1 December 1957)", Walkabout, 23 (12), Australian National Travel Association, ISSN 0043-0064
- Chandler L. G. (1 December 1958), "The Fight for Survival (1 December 1958)", Walkabout, 24 (12), Australian National Travel Association, ISSN 0043-0064
- Chandler L. G. (1 October 1959), "A National Park in the balance (1 October 1959)", Walkabout, 25 (10), Australian National Travel Association, ISSN 0043-0064
- Chandler, L.G. (1965). "Eileen Ramsay's story – four years after." Riverlander November 1965, 8–9.

== Exhibitions ==
- 2021 Soldier Settler, Magnet Galleries, Melbourne
- 2021 Mildura Arts Centre joint show with work of Eileen Ramsay, to 25 April (Anzac Day).
- 2016 Grief and Glory inclusion, Magnet Galleries, Melbourne
- 1932 Bolton Camera Club Annual International Exhibition of Pictorial and Scientific Photography, April 2 - April 9,
- 1931 Seventy-sixth Annual Exhibition of The Royal Photographic Society of Great Britain, September 12 - October 10,
- 1930 Seventy-fifth Annual Exhibition of The Royal Photographic Society of Great Britain, September 13 - October 11,
- 1929 Pacific International Salon of Photographic Art, September 18–28,
- 1929 Pacific International Salon of Photographic Art, October 5–15,
- 1929 Seventy-fourth Annual Exhibition of the Royal Photographic Society of Great Britain, September 14 - October 12,
- 1929 Second International Invitation Salon of the Camera Club of New York, May 1–15, June 6–30, May 16 - June 5, 1929
- 1928 Seventy-third Annual Exhibition of the Royal Photographic Society of Great Britain, September 17 - October 13

== Bibliography ==
- Robin, Libby. (2001). The Flight of the Emu: a hundred years of Australian ornithology 1901-2001. Carlton, Vic. Melbourne University Press. ISBN 0-522-84987-3

== See also ==
Further biographical details for Les Chandler appear in H. M. Whittell's The Literature of Australian Birds
