= Manual =

Manual may refer to:

== Instructions ==
- User guide
- Instruction manual (gaming)
- Online help
- Procedures manual
- Handbook

== Other uses ==
- Manual (music), a keyboard, as for an organ
- Manual (band)
- Manual transmission
- Manual, a bicycle technique similar to a wheelie, but without the use of pedal torque
- Manual, balancing on two wheels in freestyle skateboarding tricks
- The Manual (How to Have a Number One the Easy Way) is a 1988 book by Bill Drummond and Jimmy Cauty

== See also ==
- Instruction (disambiguation)
- Tutorial
- Manuel (disambiguation)
