= Gertrude Blanch =

American mathematician

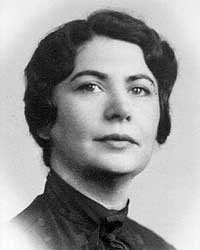
- Blanch at the start of the Mathematical Tables Projects, 1938
- Born: February 2, 1897; Kolno, Russia (now Poland)
- Education: New York University (BS); Cornell University (MS, PhD)

Gertrude Blanch (February 2, 1897 – January 1, 1996) was an American mathematician who did pioneering work in numerical analysis and computation. She was a leader of the Mathematical Tables Project in New York from its beginning. She worked later as the assistant director and leader of the Numerical Analysis at UCLA computing division and was head of mathematical research for the Aerospace Research Laboratory at Wright-Patterson Air Force Base in Dayton, Ohio.

== Early years and education ==
Blanch was born on February 2, 1897, as Gittel Kaimowitz in Kolno to Wolfe Kaimowitz and Dora Blanc. Kolno was historically a part of Poland, but was part of the Russian Empire at the time. Blanch was the youngest of seven or nine children. Wolfe Kaimowitz emigrated to the United States, and in 1907, Dora Blanc, ten-year-old Blanch, and one other daughter joined him in New York.

Blanch attended schools within Brooklyn, New York, and graduated from Eastern District High School in 1914. Later that year, Kaimowitz died, so Blanch decided to take a job to support her family. Blanch worked clerical positions for fourteen years (1914-1928), saving money for school along the way. She became an American citizen in 1921. After her mother died in 1927, Blanch started taking evening classes at Washington Square College, part of New York University. In 1932, Blanch received her Bachelor of Science degree in Mathematics with a minor in Physics from New York University. She graduated with summa cum laude and was a member of Phi Beta Kappa, a prestigious academic honor society. That same year, she changed her name from Kaimowitz to Blanch, an Americanized version of her mother's name. After writing her thesis titled "Properties of the Veneroni Transformation in S_{4}", she received her Ph.D. from Cornell University in algebraic geometry in 1935. The results from her thesis were published in the American Journal of Mathematics in 1936.

== Career ==
Blanch was unable to find a job in her area of study after she graduated with her PhD, due to the Great Depression. For a year (1935-1936), she worked in place of a colleague on leave at Hunter College. Afterwards, she worked a clerical position.

Blanch enrolled in an evening course on relativity at Brooklyn College, instructed by Arnold Lowan. Upon learning of Blanch's PhD in mathematics, Lowan extended an invitation to Blanch to join the Works Progress Administration project, where she was assigned to a supervisory position. In February 1938, she began work on the Mathematical Tables Project of the WPA, for which she was mathematical director and Chair of the Planning Committee. As a member of the Planning Committee, Blanch decided which mathematical functions were to be calculated, and constructed the computing plans used by the computers. While the Planning Committee was in operation, it included women other than Blanch such as Ida Rhodes, Jenny Rosenthal, and Irene Stegun. The Planning Committee was in charge of 450 human computers with varying knowledge of mathematics.

Blanch's duties entailed designing algorithms that were executed by teams of human computers under her direction. Many of these computers possessed only rudimentary mathematical skills, but the algorithms and error checking in the Mathematical Tables Project were sufficiently well designed that their output defined the standard for transcendental function solutions for decades. This project later became the Computation Laboratory of the National Bureau of Standards. During her last two years at the WPA, she worked as an evening tutor at Brooklyn College.

The Mathematical Tables Project became an independent organization following the termination of the WPA at the end of 1942. During World War II, it operated as a major computing office for the US government and did calculations for the Office of Scientific Research and Development, the Army's map grid, the Navy's LORAN radio navigation system, the Manhattan Project and other institutions. The project also performed important calculations for Operation Overlord. Using a mathematical model developed by Jerzy Neyman, the group helped evaluate strategies designed to bomb the Normandy beaches. Blanch led the group throughout the war.

After the war, Blanch's career was hampered by FBI suspicions that she was secretly a communist. During this time the National Bureau of Standards was investigated by the loyalty board of the Department of Commerce. Their evidence for her communist ties was scarce and included, for example, the observation that she had never married or had children, as well as the fact that her sister was affiliated with the Communist Party. In a May 1952 hearing, all charges were resolved. With her name cleared, she was able to resume her work.

Subsequently, she worked for the Institute for Numerical Analysis at UCLA until it was closed in June 1954. While at UCLA, she interviewed Grace Hopper for a position there, though Hopper instead took a position at UNIVAC. Blanch then became a mathematician for the computer division of Consolidated Engineering in Pasadena, California for a couple of months until a friend she had made at the Mathematical Tables Project, Chief mathematician Knox Millsaps, recruited her to be a senior mathematician for the Aerospace Research Laboratory at Wright-Patterson Air Force Base in Dayton, Ohio. The Air Force hired her to work on computations dealing with turbulence, air flow, and transonic and supersonic flight. In 1962, Blanch was promoted to government senior scientist. She was an early member of the ACM.

== Publications ==
Blanch published over 30 articles on functional approximation, numerical analysis and Mathieu functions. Between 1940 and 1942, while at the Mathematical Tables Project, several important papers were jointly published with Lowan, including a project with physicist Hans Bethe which involved complex calculations to determine various properties of stars.

- The Gertrude Blanch Papers (1932–1996)
- Tables of Planck's Radiation and Photon Functions (1940)
- Error in Hayashi's Table of Bessel Functions for Complex Arguments (1941)
- On the Inversion of the Q-Series Associated with Jacobian Elliptic Functions (1942)
- The Internal Temperature Density Distribution of the Sun (1941)

== Honors, awards, and tributes ==
In 1963, she was elected a Fellow of the American Association for the Advancement of Science. In 1964, she received the Federal Woman's Award, an award for women who had exemplary professional service in the United States Government.

- Air Force Outstanding Performance Award (1958)
- Air Force Exceptional Service Award (1963)
- Fellow of the American Association for the Advancement of Science (1963)
- Federal Woman's Award (1964)
- Inducted into the Portrait Gallery at the National Institution of Standards and Technology (2017)

Ida Rhodes dedicated her 1965 talk "The Mighty Man-Computer Team" to Blanch, saying "She has always exemplified for me everything that is noble, true, and admirable in a human being. To her I owe whatever success I have had in my career, for she taught me everything I know about computation and numerical analysis."

In 1967, Gaetano Fichera wrote of "the critical sharpness of [Blanch's] mind, her sensitivity to the quantitative study of problems, her capacity to perceive the subtle barrier which separates a purely theoretical procedure from a method leading to effective evaluation and, above all her intransigeant scientific scrupulousness, all these many qualities make of her a very distinguished numerical analysis. Ample witness of our affirmation is not only the high acknowledgment accorded to her mathematical activity but especially the imposing mass of her work in the field of numerical analysis."

== Later years ==
Blanch retired in 1967 at the age of 69, but through Ohio State University continued working as a consultant for the Air Force until 1970 when Ohio State canceled all military funded contracts. Thereafter she moved to San Diego, California where she worked on her book about functional approximations until it was completed in 1982 but never published. Blanch then continued to work on numerical solutions of Mathieu functions, specifically concentrating on the use of continued fractions to achieve highly accurate results in a small number of computational steps to which she completed an unpublished manuscript. She continued this research until her death in January 1996.

The Gertrude Blanch Papers, 1932–1996 are accessible at the Charles Babbage Institute, University of Minnesota, Minneapolis.
