= The Enchiridion (Sun & Storm) =

The Enchiridion is a 1992 role-playing supplement for Sun & Storm published by Storm Publications.

== Contents ==
The Enchiridion is a supplement in which character information is provided.

== Reception ==
Wayne Ligon reviewed The Enchiridion in White Wolf #44 (June, 1994), rating it a 2.5 out of 5 and stated that "An original introduction in The Enchiridion sets the stage for some interesting ideas, but they aren't followed up on."

== Reviews ==
- Shadis #15 (Sept., 1994)
