= The Literature of Australian Birds =

1954 book by Hubert Massey Whittell

- Author: Hubert Massey Whittell
- Language: English
- Subject: Australian ornithology
- Genre: History and bibliography
- Publisher: Paterson Brokensha Pty Ltd
- Publication date: 1954
- Publication place: Australia
- Media type: Print (hardcover)
- Pages: xii + 116 + 788

The Literature of Australian Birds is a book published in 1954 by Paterson Brokensha in Perth, Western Australia. Its full title is The Literature of Australian Birds: A History and a Bibliography of Australian Ornithology. It was authored by Hubert Massey Whittell. It is in large octavo format (252 by 184 millimetres or 9.9 by 7.2 inches) and contains some 900 pages, two separately paginated parts bound in one volume in brown buckram. It contains a coloured frontispiece (Plate 1) of a drawing of the superb lyrebird by Lieutenant-General Thomas Davies from 1799, with another 31 black-and-white plates bound between Parts 1 and 2.

Part 1, titled “A History of Australian Ornithology 1618 to 1850”, is 116 pages in length. It covers the period from the exploratory Dutch voyages of the early 17th century to the voyages of HMS Fly and HMS Rattlesnake during 1842–1850. Much the larger part of the book, however, lies in the 788 pages of Part 2, titled “A Bibliography of Australian Ornithology 1618 to 1950, with Biographies of Authors, Collectors and Others”, where Whittell has attempted to be exhaustively comprehensive in compiling mentions of Australian birds, not only from the scientific literature but also from newspapers, magazines and other published sources, and including potted biographies of their authors. The two parts of the book are dedicated separately, Part 1: "To D.L.S. in Appreciation of our long Association in Australian Ornithology", and Part 2: "In Memoriam. GREGORY MACALISTER MATHEWS C.B.E. A Pioneer Bibliographer of the Literature of Australian Birds. OBIT 1947."

A facsimile edition was published by Oak Knoll Press in 1993 (ISBN 1888262680). In 1995 the Bird Observers Club of Australia (BOCA) published BOCA Report Number 6 – “Whittell (1618-1950) Supplemented. Additions and Emendations to H.M. Whittell’s The Literature of Australian Birds”, compiled by Tess Kloot. In the preface to this latter work Kloot comments, with regard to Whittell:

In his monumental work, The Literature of Australian Birds, (Paterson Brokensha Pty Ltd, 1954), the late Major H. M. Whittell paid tribute to those who went before him : In 1925 Gregory M. Mathews issued, as a supplement to his Birds of Australia, a bibliography of books and articles studied in the preparation of his work, plus brief biographical notes on the authors; and in 1935 Anthony Musgrave published his Bibliography of Australian Entomology 1775-1930. In turn, I can do no better than pay tribute to Major Whittell. With his book constantly before me as I worked, I never ceased to wonder at his exhaustive research and meticulous attention to detail. It is indeed a remarkable achievement. I offer this modest contribution (and later, A Bio-bibliography of Australian Ornithology: 1951-1975) in the hope that others who come after me will build upon my work.

== Sources ==
- Kloot, Tess (1995). Whittell (1618-1950) Supplemented. Additions and Emendations to H.M. Whittell's The Literature of Australian Birds. Melbourne: Bird Observers Club of Australia.
- Whittell, Hubert Massey (1954). The Literature of Australian Birds: A History and a Bibliography of Australian Ornithology (PDF). Perth: Paterson Brokensha. LCCN 56000760. OCLC 2851290. OL 6194318M. Wikidata Q7747557.
