= Harley Webster (illustrator) =

Australian illustrator and conservationist

Hargreaves Ogilvie Webster (born 1909, date of death unknown) was an illustrator and conservationist. He was born in Bunbury, Western Australia. He is noted as a contributing illustrator to Birds of Western Australia and for work to protect the fauna of the Southwest Australia ecoregion, especially the noisy scrub-bird (Atrichornis clamosus).

Webster attended Bunbury High School and Claremont Training College, and completed a degree in art at the University of Western Australia in 1962. Webster was a Primary School teacher, retiring from that occupation as the Albany Primary School's headmaster in 1974 to pursue his interest in the ornithology. His research on the scrub-bird and other fauna of the region is associated with the establishment of Two Peoples Bay Nature Reserve.
