= Irene Stegun =

American mathematician (1919–2008)

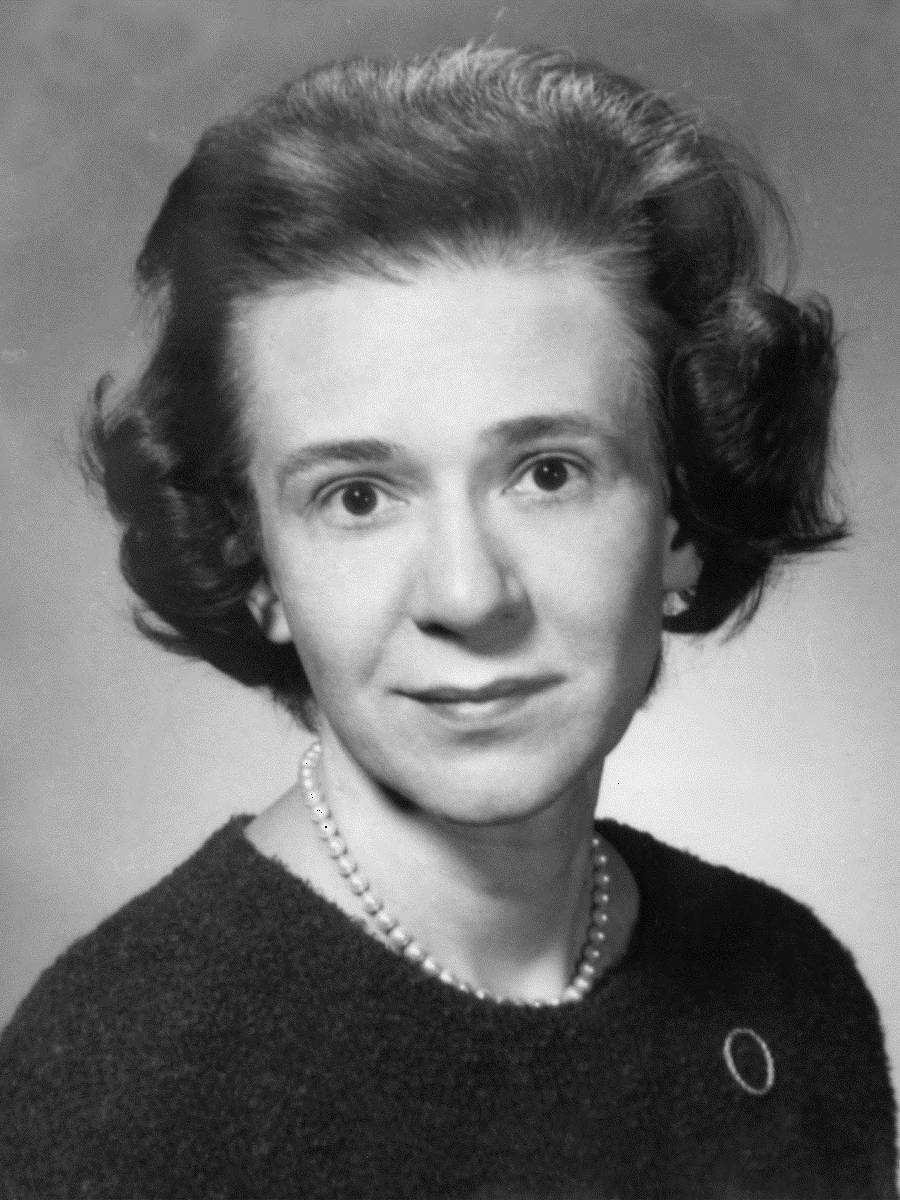
- Stegun, c. 1995
- Born: February 9, 1919; Yonkers, New York
- Died: January 27, 2008 (aged 88); Danbury, Connecticut

Academic background
- Education: Columbia University

Academic work
- Notable works: A Handbook of Mathematical Functions (1964)

Irene Ann Stegun (February 9, 1919 – January 27, 2008) was an American mathematician at the National Bureau of Standards (NBS, now the National Institute of Standards and Technology) who edited a classic book of mathematical tables called A Handbook of Mathematical Functions, widely known as Abramowitz and Stegun.

== Early life and education ==
Stegun was born in Yonkers, New York, the daughter of Richard Stegun and Regina Skakandi Stegun. Her parents were both immigrants from central Europe. Her father owned a restaurant. She trained as a teacher, and later completed a master's degree in mathematics at Columbia University.

== Career ==
Stegun began her mathematical career during the Second World War. After teaching mathematics at a Catholic school in New York, she joined the Planning Committee of the Mathematical Tables Project of the WPA. In that role, she learned the basics of numerical analysis from the committee's chair, Gertrude Blanch. While working at the Mathematics Tables Project, she completed her master's degree at Columbia.

Stegun is also credited with performing the numerical calculations supporting Robert D. Richtmyer's development of artificial viscosity methods for the numerical solution of compressible fluid flow problems with shock waves.

In 1948, Stegun and a handful of other members of the Mathematical Tables Project moved to Washington, D.C., where they set up the Computation Laboratory of the National Bureau of Standards. She eventually rose to assistant chief of the Computation Laboratory at NBS. In 1965, Stegun was awarded a Gold Medal from the Department of Commerce for her efforts in completing the project. She held the position of assistant chief of the Computing Lab until she became the interim director in 1965.

== Publications ==
Stegun and Milton Abramowitz co-edited a book of mathematical tables called A Handbook of Mathematical Functions (1964). The handbook is considered a classic, "a major cooperative endeavor" and "one of the very few scientific activities of the 1950s led by a woman." The pair also wrote articles for academic journals including Physical Review, Journal of the Society for Industrial and Applied Mathematics, and Mathematics of Computation. Abramowitz died in 1958, before their book was published. With other co-authors, she also had publications in the Journal of Applied Physics and the Journal of Research of the National Bureau of Standards.

- "Generation of Coulomb Wave Functions by Means of Recurrence Relations" (1955, with Milton Abramowitz)
- "Pitfalls in Computation" (1956, with Milton Abramowitz)
- "Generation of Bessel Functions on High Speed Computers" (1957, with Milton Abramowitz)
- "Ferroelectric Switching and the Sievert Integral" (1963, with P. H. Fang)
- "Automatic computing methods for special functions" (1970, with Ruth Zucker)
- "Automatic computing methods for special functions. Part II. The exponential integral En (x)" (1974, with Ruth Zucker)
- "Automatic computing methods for special functions. Part III. The sine, cosine, exponential integrals, and related functions" (1976, with Ruth Zucker)
- "Automatic Computing Methods for Special Functions. Part IV. Complex Error Function, Fresnel Integrals, and Other Related Functions" (1981, with Ruth Zucker)

== Death ==
Stegun died in 2008, at the age of 88, in Danbury, Connecticut.

== See also ==
- Timeline of women in science
