= Binas (book) =

Educational book in Dutch

BiNaS
- Cover of the Noordhoff Uitgevers edition
- Author: R. Bouwens; W. Kranendonk; J. van Lune
- Language: Dutch
- Subject: Science reference work
- Genre: Informative
- Publisher: Noordhoff Uitgevers
- Publication date: 25 October 2022
- Publication place: Netherlands
- ISBN: 978-90-01-00724-9

The Binas (Often written as BiñaS or BINAS) is a Dutch science reference work (a handbook) for the higher levels of secondary school, consisting largely of tables and formulas. The name stands for biologie, natuurkunde, scheikunde (biology, physics, chemistry). It is compiled by NVON (Dutch Association for Education in the Natural Sciences) and has been published by Noordhoff Uitgevers since it became the standard reference work allowed at the central examinations in 1975. An English version of the Binas is also available.

== Contents ==
The Binas is divided into five chapters: general, physics, mathematics, chemistry, and biology. Each chapter consists of multiple tables, each with specific information. These tables can be short or can span up to a few pages. To find information, students can use the alphabetical register in the back. The Binas does not make use of page numbers, but instead the register refers you to a table number.

- General. This chapter contains an extensive overview of units of measurement and quantities in the International System of units. This chapter continues in the back of the Binas with safety and environment.
- Physics. The contents of this chapter include physical constants, physical properties of materials, and isotopes. Additionally, it contains information about astronomy, electricity, etc.
- Mathematics. This chapter contains just one table with a number of mathematical formulas.
- Chemistry. The tables in this chapter contain information about chemicals, elements, materials, and reactions. In the back of the Binas, there is a periodic table.
- Biology. This chapter contains tables about general concepts of biology, such as: DNA, cells, circulatory system of the human body, reproduction, etc.
