= Digital Library of Mathematical Functions =

Online collection of special functions from NIST

The Digital Library of Mathematical Functions (DLMF) is an online project at the National Institute of Standards and Technology (NIST) to develop a database of mathematical reference data for special functions and their applications. It is intended as an update of Abramowitz's and Stegun's Handbook of Mathematical Functions (A&S). It was published online on 7 May 2010, though some chapters appeared earlier. In the same year it appeared at Cambridge University Press under the title NIST Handbook of Mathematical Functions.

In contrast to A&S, whose initial print run was done by the U.S. Government Printing Office and was in the public domain, NIST asserts that it holds copyright to the DLMF under Title 17 USC 105 of the U.S. Code.

== See also ==
- NIST Dictionary of Algorithms and Data Structures
