= Milton Abramowitz =

American mathematician (1915–1958)

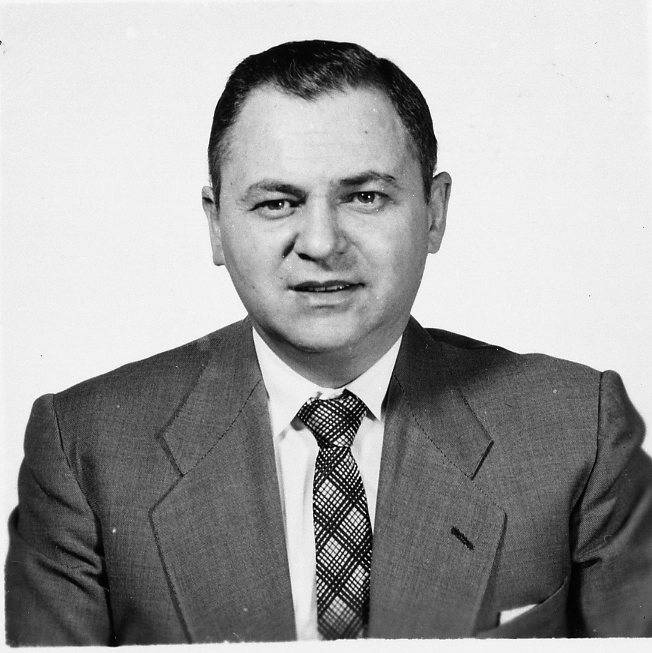
- Born: February 13, 1915; Brooklyn, New York, US
- Died: July 5, 1958 (aged 43); Washington, D.C., US

Academic background
- Education: Brooklyn College; New York University
- Thesis: On the Backflow of a Viscous Fluid in a Diverging Channel (1948)

Academic work
- Notable works: A Handbook of Mathematical Functions (1964)

Milton Abramowitz (19 February 1915 – 5 July 1958) was an American mathematician at the National Bureau of Standards (NBS) who, with Irene Stegun, edited a classic book of mathematical tables called Handbook of Mathematical Functions, widely known as "Abramowitz and Stegun".

== Education and career ==
Abramowitz was born in Brooklyn, NY. He received a B. A. in mathematics in 1937 from Brooklyn College. He joined the NBS Math Tables Project in 1938, first as a member of the technical planning staff, while continuing his graduate studies at Brooklyn College in the evening. He obtained his M. A. in mathematics in 1940 and went on to attend the Ph.D. program in Mathematics at New York University, where he was supervised by Kurt Otto Friedrichs and graduated in 1948. In 1954, Abramowitz became the Chief of the Computation Laboratory of the NBS Applied Mathematics Division. In 1958, he died while mowing the lawn of his home in suburban Washington, when the heat caused a heart attack.

== Research ==
In 1953, Abramowitz studied the behavior of the integral $f(x) := \int_0^{\infty}e^{-u^2 - x/u}du$ as a function of x, which was previously studied in physical problems where particle velocities were distributed according to a Maxwellian distribution. He found a power series expression for this function useful for small x, as well as the asymptotic $f(x)\approx\sqrt{\frac{\pi}{3}}e^{-3(x/2)^{2/3}}$for large x. More generally, he showed that the integral $f_m(x) := \int_0^{\infty}u^m e^{-u^2 - x/u}du$ asymptotes to $\sqrt{\frac{\pi}{3}} \cdot 3^{-m/2}\cdot z^{m/2}e^{-z}$ where $z := 3(x/2)^{2/3}$ for large x.

In 1957, Abramowitz and Stegun proposed an algorithm for numerically computing the values of Bessel functions $J_n(x)$ and $Y_n(x)$ in the regime where both the index n and the argument x were large, using a recurrence relation.

=== Coulomb wave functions ===
In 1954, Abramowitz and H. A. Antosiewicz studied the Coulomb wave functions in the form $d^2y/d\rho + (1 - \frac{2\eta}{\rho} + \frac{L(L + 1)}{\rho^2})y = 0$. By expressing them in terms of the Airy functions as $y_1(x, \mu) = \phi(x, \mu)Ai(x) + \psi(x, \mu)Ai'(x)$ and $y_2(x, \mu) = \phi(x, \mu)Bi(x) + \psi(x, \mu)Bi'(x)$, they were able to expand the functions $\phi(x, \mu), \psi(x, \mu)$ as a power series in x. In the same issue of Physical Review, Abramowitz and Philip Rabinowitz were able to find an expansion for the Coulomb wave functions in the special case $2\eta = \rho$ using the method of steepest descent.

== Legacy ==
At the time of Abramowitz' death, the book was not yet completed but was well underway. Irene Stegun took over management of the project and was able to finish the work by 1964, working under the direction of the NBS Chief of Numerical Analysis Philip J. Davis, who was also a contributor to the book. The major work of producing reliable mathematical tables, was part of the WPA project of Franklin Roosevelt.

In his memory, the Abramowitz Award is granted by the University of Maryland, College Park to students "for superior competence and promise in the field of mathematics and its applications." Winners of this award include Charles Fefferman and Sergey Brin.
