= Handbook =

Type of reference book

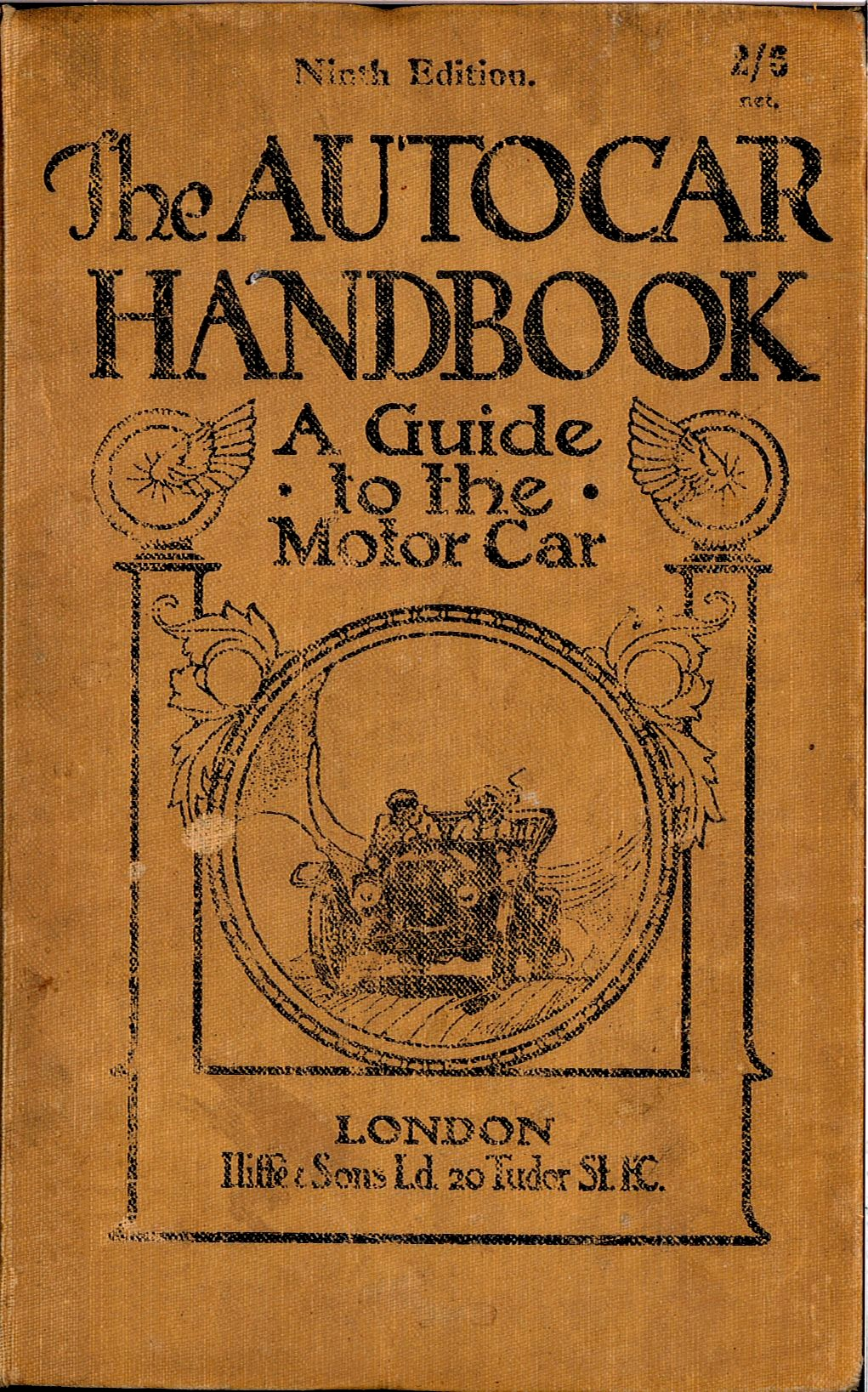
Early 20th century handbook for operating a motor car

A handbook is a type of reference work, or other collection of instructions, that is intended to provide ready reference. The term originally applied to a small or portable book containing information useful for its owner, but the Oxford English Dictionary defines the current sense as "any book ... giving information such as facts on a particular subject, guidance in some art or occupation, instructions for operating a machine, or information for tourists."

A handbook is sometimes referred to as a vade mecum (Latin, "go with me") or pocket reference. It may also be referred to as an enchiridion. Historically, practical knowledge was typically learnt from a more experienced person. Due to literacy rates, many people could not learn from sources such as handbooks. The term signifies that it is a book "on hand". During the nineteenth century, many technological and scientific handbooks became "unhandy" in size and instead book series were more suitable, hence why the definition of handbook evolved.

Handbooks may deal with any topic, and are generally compendiums of information in a particular field or about a particular technique. They are designed to be easily consulted and provide quick answers in a certain area. For example, the MLA Handbook for Writers of Research Papers is a reference for how to cite works in MLA style, among other things. Examples of engineering handbooks include Perry's Chemical Engineers' Handbook, Marks' Standard Handbook for Mechanical Engineers, and the CRC Handbook of Chemistry and Physics.

== See also ==
- Enchiridion
- Guide book
- Manual (disambiguation)
- Oxford Companions
- Textbook
- Abramowitz and Stegun Handbook of Mathematical Functions
- CRC Handbook of Chemistry and Physics
- Mathematical tables
- MAOL, a Finnish handbook for science
- Binas (book), a Dutch science handbook
