= Hattah-Kulkyne National Park =

National park in Victoria, Australia

- IUCN category II (national park)
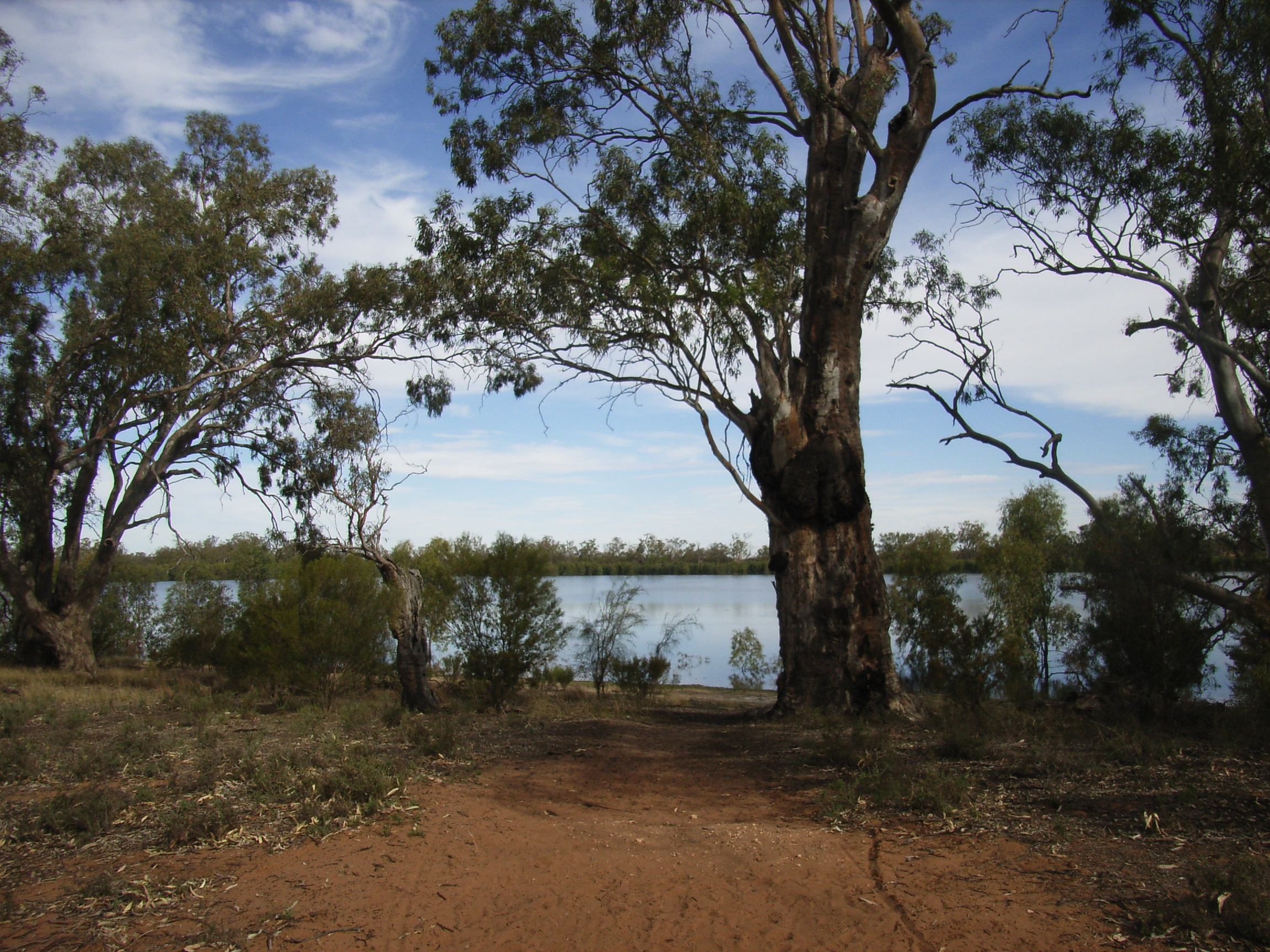
- Hattah Lake, within the national park.

- Location within Victoria
- Location: Victoria
- Nearest city: Mildura
- Coordinates: 34°41′14″S 142°22′54″E
- Area: 480 km^{2} (190 sq mi)
- Established: 7 June 1960
- Governing body: Parks Victoria
- Website: Official website

Ramsar Wetland
- Official name: Hattah-Kulkyne Lakes
- Designated: 15 December 1982
- Reference no.: 264

The Hattah-Kulkyne National Park is a national park in the Mallee district of Victoria, Australia. The 48,000-hectare (120,000-acre) national park is situated adjacent to the Murray River, approximately 417 kilometres (259 mi) northwest of Melbourne with the nearest regional centre being Mildura. The Hattah Lakes National Park was proclaimed on 7 June 1960, later being greatly expanded in 1980 and becoming the Hattah-Kulkyne National Park. It is a popular destination for bushwalkers and school camping trips.

== History ==
In 1915, a sanctuary was formed to protect the beauty of the Hattah lakes. In 1949, ornithologist Les Chandler and the Reverend Clarrie Lang formed the Sunraysia Field Naturalists' Club (later the Sunraysia Naturalists' Research Trust). Les Chandler was variously its president, vice-president, secretary, treasurer and editor. They agitated to have the Hattah-Kulkyne area declared a national park, which was partially achieved in 1960, with the Hattah Lakes area becoming the Hattah Lakes National Park. The Kulkyne State Forest was added to the national park in 1980, resulting in the creation of the Hattah-Kulkyne National Park.

== Description ==
The park is in the Mallee district, famous for its red dirt and mallee eucalypts. There are several lakes in the area, the largest of which is Lake Hattah. During the dry season most of the lakes and their streams dry out completely. Although there are limited road and tracks, there are several major high tension power and telegraph lines that run through or near the park, around which large areas are cleared. For management purposes, the Hattah-Kulkyne National Park is managed with the Murray-Sunset National Park, Wyperfeld National Park, Lake Albacutya Park and Murray-Kulkyne Park as part of the Victorian Mallee Parks.

== Important Bird Area ==
Over 200 bird species have been recorded in the park, which is overlapped by the Murray-Sunset, Hattah and Annuello Important Bird Area (IBA), so identified by BirdLife International because it contains mallee habitat supporting a suite of threatened mallee birds, including the malleefowl, black-eared miner and mallee emu-wren.

== See also ==
- Protected areas of Victoria
- Hattah-Kulkyne and Murray-Kulkyne Biosphere Reserve
- List of national parks of Australia
