= List of Australian field naturalist clubs =

List of Australian natural history and conservation groups

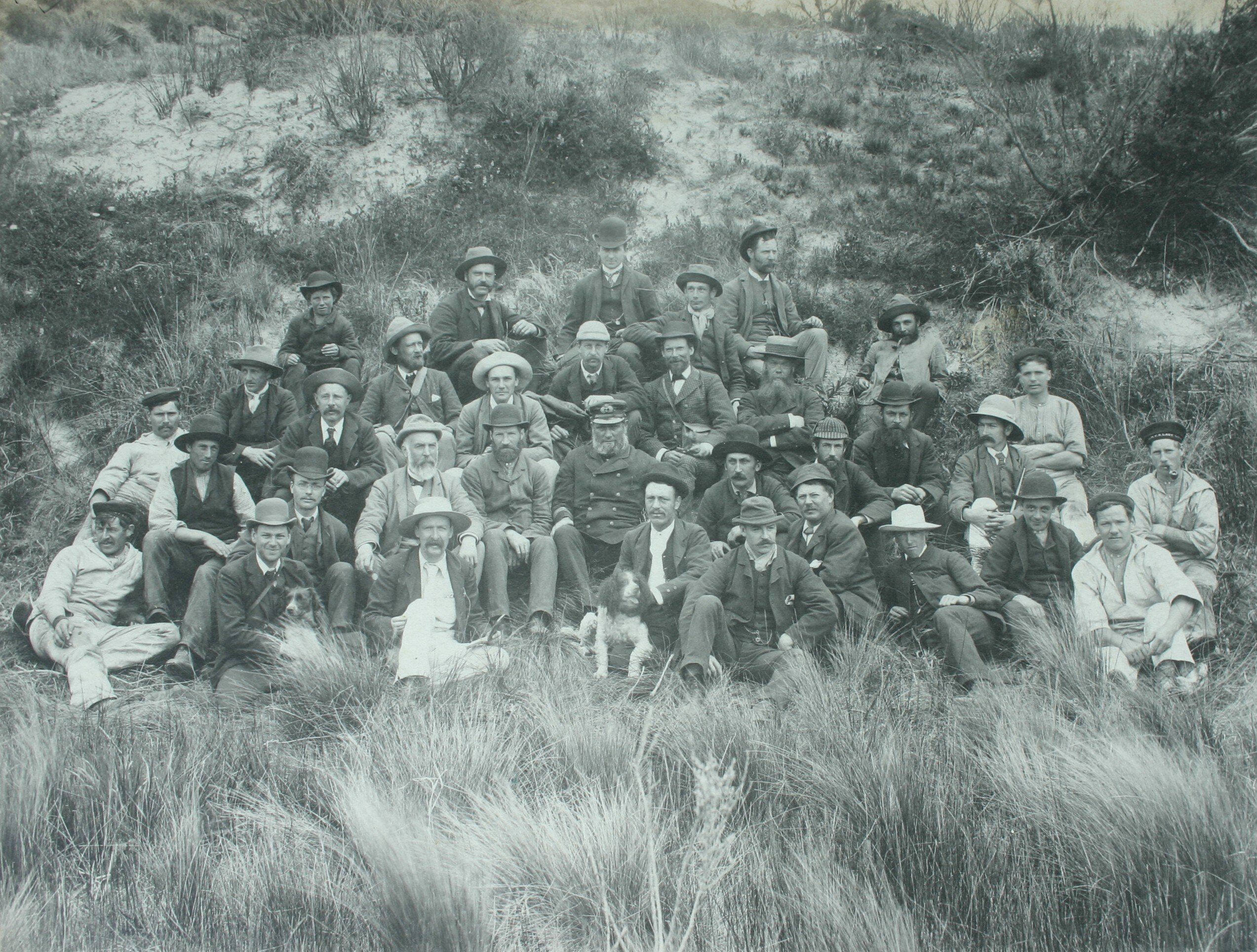
The Field Naturalists Club of Victoria's Expedition to King Island, 1887

This is a list of Australia's field naturalist clubs. These natural history and conservation societies are dedicated to the study, appreciation and conservation of the natural environment in their local regions. Australia has a long field naturalist club history, with the earliest club, the Field Naturalists Club of Victoria, being founded in 1880.

You can find out how to join a Field Naturalists Club and what field naturalist do by visiting Field Naturalists Australia

== Australian Capital Territory ==
Name	Year founded	Location	Notes	Official Webpages
Field Naturalists Association of Canberra	1981	Canberra	Produces and publishes the naturalist newsletter, The Field Natter, since 1989.	Club website

== New South Wales ==
Name	Year founded	Location	Notes	Official Webpages
Goulburn Field Naturalists Society	1965	Goulburn	Actively participates in local conservation projects in the Goulburn area. The club has published the Birds of Goulburn & District, which covers all rare and uncommon species of birds native to the area.	Club website
Albury-Wodonga Field Naturalists Club	1965	Albury-Wodonga	Club hosts monthly meetings and field trips in and around the Albury-Wodonga area. Works closely and is hosted by the Friends of Chiltern Mt Pilot National Park.	Club website
Barrier Field Naturalists Club	1920	Broken Hill	Club hosts monthly meetings and field trips in and around the Broken Hill area. The club was co-founded by acclaimed botanist Albert Morris, and in 2021 celebrated its centenary with the Broken Hill Historical Society and the Albert Kersten Mining and Mineral Museum.	
Dubbo Field Naturalist & Conservation Society	1977	Dubbo	Hosts monthly meetings and field trips in the Dubbo area. This has included self-guided bush walks and ecological revitalisation activities along the Macquarie-Wambul River.	Club website
Murrumbidgee Field Naturalists	1994	Nerranda, Griffith and Wagga Wagga	Originally based in Nerranda, but has expanded to include branches in Griffith and Wagga Wagga. The club's conservation work covers their local area, primarily focusing on the Murrumbidgee River Valley. They are a member of the Murrumbidgee Environmental Water Advisory Group, working with Curtin University to monitor the biodiversity of the Gayini wetlands. They have received community grants to continue this work by Griffith City Council.	Club website
Orange Field Naturalist & Conservation Society	1974	Orange	Hosts monthly meetings and field trips in the Orange area, and continues to produce field guides for native orchids.	Club website

== Northern Territory ==
Name	Year founded	Location	Notes	Official Webpages
Alice Springs Field Naturalists Club		Alice Springs	Publishes the Alice Springs Field Naturalists Club Newsletter.	Club website

== Queensland ==
Name	Year founded	Location	Notes	Official Webpages
Queensland Naturalists Club	1906	West End	The club can trace its history back to 1859, as a subsidiary of the Queensland Philosophical Society, however its inaugural meeting was held in 1906. It was originally called the Queensland Field Naturalists Club, changing to its current name in 1922. The club is the largest naturalist group in the state and acts as a parent organisation to the regional clubs across Queensland.	Club website
Chinchilla Field Naturalists Club	1967	Chinchilla	Has published a compendium of observations titled Going bush with Chinchilla Nats: thirty years of field observations (1997).	Club webpage
South Burnett Field Naturalists Club		Murgon		Club information webpage
Tamborine Mountain Natural History Association		Tamborine	Published A Natural history of Tamborine Mountain (1988) by Joy Guyatt. The club funded a plaque commemorating Ian Stuart MacDonald, and field naturalist and founder of the club.	
Stanthorpe Field Naturalist Club	1969	Stanthorpe	Publishes a monthly newsletter since 1969.	Club website
Toowoomba Field Naturalists	1951	Toowoomba	Published Flora, Fauna and Fellowship 70 Years of the Toowoomba Field Naturalist Club (2021) by Francis Mangubhai with Diane Pagel and Glenda Walter, as well as a field guide on frogs in the Toowoomba area.	Club website

== South Australia ==
Name	Year founded	Location	Notes	Official Webpages
Field Naturalists Society of South Australia	1883	Adelaide	Founded in 1883 as a section of the Royal Society of South Australia, inspired by the success of the Field Naturalists Club of Victoria three years earlier. Originally called the 'Field Naturalists' Section of the Royal Society of South Australia', the club was incorporated in 1959. The club has published The South Australian Naturalist since 1919.	Club website The South Australian Naturalist
Kangaroo Island Flora & Fauna Club		Kangaroo Island	Published the Native orchids of Kangaroo Island: a field guide (2017).	Club webpage
Riverland Field Naturalists		Riverland	In 1986 the club established the Littra House Memorial on Lake Littra, stabilising the buildings' ruins through funding from State Government.	Club website

== Tasmania ==
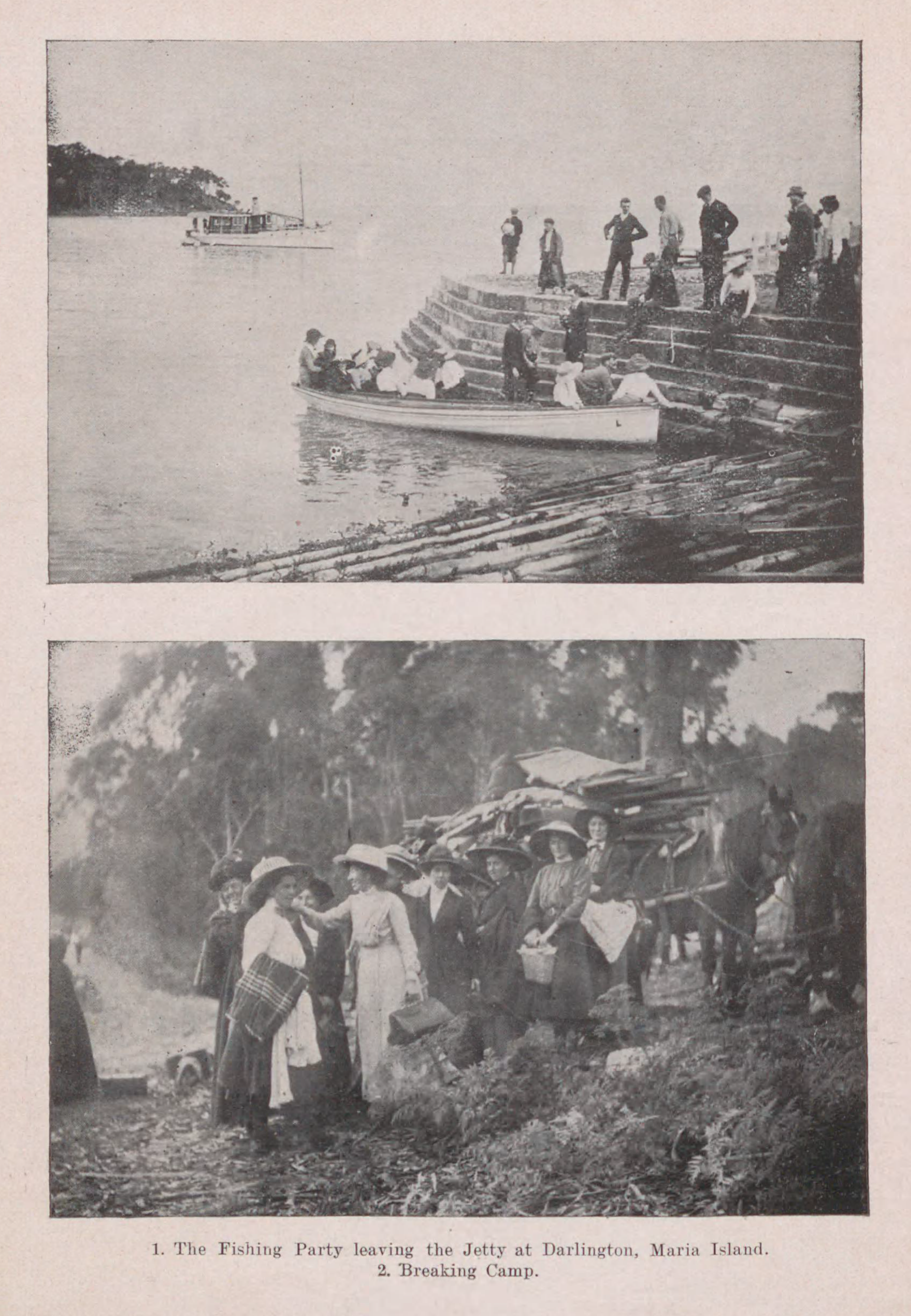
The Fishing Party Leaving the Jetty at Darlington, Maria Island and Breaking Camp, Tasmanian Field Naturalists' Club Easter Camp Report, 1912

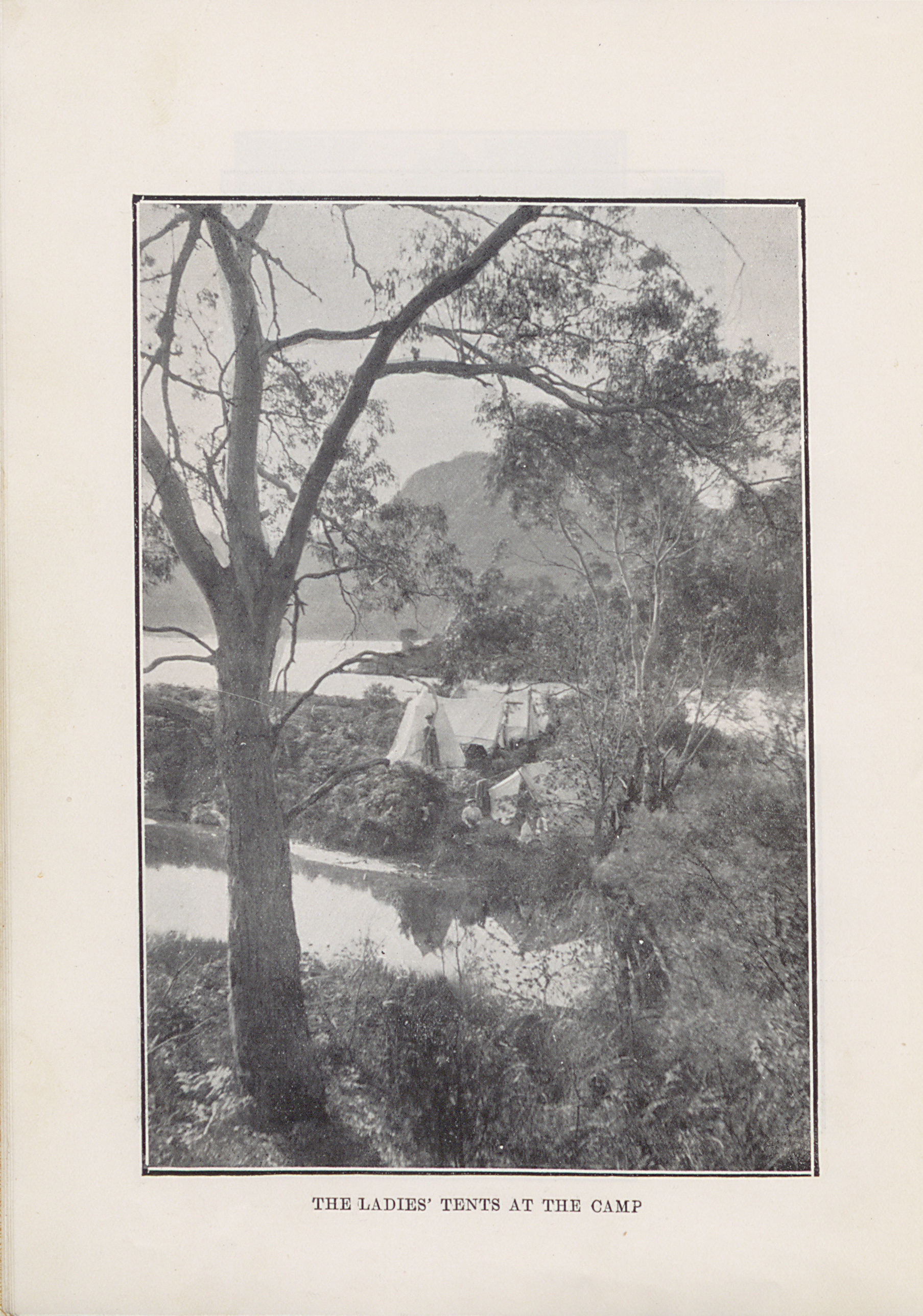
The Ladies' Tents, Tasmanian Field Naturalists' Club Easter Camp, 1909

Name	Year founded	Location	Notes	Official Webpages
Tasmanian Field Naturalists Club	1904	Hobart	The first club of its kind to be founded in Tasmania, it has played a critical role in guiding and enabling amateur and professional research and conservation work for Tasmania's flora and fauna. The club serves as a parent organisation to the various regional field naturalist groups in the state. The club has produced Easter Camp Reports since 1905, as well as an annual research journal, The Tasmanian Naturalist and a monthly Club Bulletin since 1907. They also publish extensive field guides of Tasmanian flora and fauna.	Club website Tasmanian Naturalist Tasmanian Field Naturalists' Club Bulletin Tasmanian Field Naturalists' Club Easter Camp Reports
North East Tasmanian Field Naturalists Club	1972	Bridport	Undertakes excursions and studies of Tasmania's natural wildlife on the North-East Region of Tasmania.	Club website
Launceston Field Naturalists Club		Launceston	Runs monthly meetings, excursions and camps. The club owns 60 hectares of native bushland at Myrtle Bank where it undertakes observation and conservation activities.	Club website
Burnie Field Naturalists Club		Burnie	Runs field trips, outings and social gatherings around the Burnie area.	Club webpage
King Island Field Naturalists Club		King Island North Hobart		Club webpage
Central North Field Naturalists (Disjunct Naturalists)		Launceston	Focused on the Central North Tasmanian bioregion, but retains members from all over Australia, and further afield. The club produces The Natural News newsletter that discusses club activities, articles from club members and current naturalist news topics. The club made a submission to the review of the Environment Protection and Biodiversity Conservation Act 1999, proposing changes to the Act in the interest of native flora and fauna.	Club website

== Victoria ==
Name	Year	Location	Notes	Official Webpages
Field Naturalists Club of Victoria	1880	Blackburn	Oldest still running field naturalist club in Australia, being founded in 1880. The club has published a journal, The Victorian Naturalist bimonthly since 1884. The club is situated in Blackburn, in Melbourne's eastern suburbs. The club serves as a parent organisation to many field naturalist clubs across Victoria, hosting yearly events, assisting in conservation efforts and acting as a leading body for the movement in the state. The club has been awarding the Australian Natural History Medallion to individuals who have made the most meritorious contribution to Australian Natural History, since 1940.	Club website The Victorian Naturalist
Ballarat Field Club and Science Society (defunct)	1882-1918	Ballarat	Predecessor of the Field Naturalists' Club of Ballarat, which now maintains the club's archives. It was the second founded field naturalist club in Victoria, behind the state club.	
Field Naturalists' Club of Ballarat	1952	Ballarat	Founded as a continuation of the Ballarat Field Club and Science Society (1882-1918), acting as a repository for the society's records. The club hosts face-to-face meetings, excursions, camps and conservation activities throughout the year. The club has also published the monthly Ballarat Naturalist since 1974.	Club website The Ballarat Naturalist
Bendigo Field Naturalists Club	1945	Bendigo	Has published the monthly field naturalist magazine, The Whirrakee since 1979. The club has also previously published The Bendigo Naturalist from 10 September 1945 to the early 1950's.	Club website
Castlemaine Field Naturalists Club	1976	Castlemaine	Alongside regular meetings and excursions, the club organises vegetation and bird surveys, as well as weed control and roadside clean up days in the local region. The club has published the monthly newsletter the Castlemaine Naturalist since 1976.	Club website The Castlemaine Naturalist
Geelong Field Naturalists Club (defunct)	1880-1932	Geelong	Published The Wombat: Journal of the Geelong Field Naturalists' Club from 1895-1902, as well as its successor, The Geelong Naturalist: The Journal of the Geelong Field Naturalists' Club until 1931.	The Wombat The Geelong Naturalist
Geelong Field Naturalists Club	1961	Geelong	Alongside regular meetings, excursion and camps, the club publishes the quarterly Geelong Naturalist: journal of the Geelong Field Naturalists Club. The club has no official ties to its predecessor.	Club Website Geelong naturalist
Peninsula Field Naturalists' Club	1952	Frankston and Mornington Peninsula	Founded as a junior group of the Field Naturalists Club of Victoria, by members of the parent organisation. Has undertaken extensive observations The club has published the Peninsula Field Naturalists' Club Newsletter on a quarterly basis since 2011. The club's emblem is the rabbit's ears orchid (Thelymitra antennifera).	Club website Peninsula Field Naturalists' Club Newsletter
Portland Field Naturalists Club	1945	Portland	Hosts monthly meetings and excursions around the local area, including Mount Richmond National Park, Lower Glenelg National Park and Cobboboonee National Parks. They publish a monthly newsletter that discusses recent excursions and observations. The club has published the Portland Field Naturalists Club Newsletter since 1968 and the Birds of the Portland District (2007 and 2019).	Club webpage Portland Field Naturalists Club Newsletter
Latrobe Valley Field Naturalists Club	1960	Latrobe Valley	Hosts monthly meetings, excursions and field camps and a bimonthly magazine, the Latrobe Valley Naturalist. The club emblem is the flying duck-orchid (Caleana major).	Club website
Maryborough Field Naturalists Club	1951	Maryborough	Hosts monthly meetings and excursions. The club has published the naturalist history guide and trail-book Exploring Maryborough & district (1988). The club has a close working relationship with the Bendigo and Castlemaine field naturalist clubs, with the three clubs jointly publishing several naturalist guidebooks and CDs. The club has been instrumental to expanding protected reserves in the area, including the founding of the Winifred Waddel Wildflower Sanctuary (1960), Bell's Swamp (1975), Clune's Swamp (1976) and Paddys Ranges State Park (1989).	Club webpage
Ringwood Field Naturalists Club	1961	Ringwood	Hosts monthly meetings, excursions and field camps and a biyearly magazine, The Whistler. Previously, the club published The Ringwood Field Naturalist, which ran from 1995 to 2015.	Club website
Upper Goulburn Field Naturalists Club	1978	Alexandra	Hosts monthly meetings and field trips.	Club webpage
Anglesea Aireys Inlet Society for the Protection of Flora & Fauna (Angair)	1969	Anglesea	Dedicated to protecting indigenous flora and fauna, hosting monthly committee meetings, excursions and various conservation activities. Since 1969, the society has hosted the Angair Nature Show, a wildflower and art show weekend, which celebrates indigenous flora and fauna and funds conservations efforts in the Inlet. The society has previously provided conservation advice to government and community bodies who are developing in the area, including working with Parks Victoria and the Surf Coast Mountain Bike Club to develop non-invasive biking paths throughout the protected land. They also host revegetation days with local school groups to propagate native plants in the area.	Club website
Bairnsdale & District Field Naturalists Club	1960	Bairnsdale	Hosts monthly general meetings, field excursions and bushwalks. The club publishes the quarterly newsletter, The Clematis. They have also published the Orchids of East Gippsland — A Field Guide (2014), which includes much of the club's survey work and observations of rare native orchids in the East Gippsland area from the foundation of the club, including across Wilsons Promontory, Licola and Mallacoota.	Club website
Donald History & Natural History Group	1962	Donald	A history and natural history organisation that manages the Donald Court House Museum which contains a wide-ranging collection of local and regional artefacts. In 2009 the museum also became a 'Keeping Place' for Indigenous Cultural Heritage Artefacts working alongside the Barengi Gadjin Land Council and the Dja Dja Wurrung Clans Aboriginal Corporation. The group is also a registered Place of Deposit for the Public Record Office Victoria.	Club website Buloke Bulletin
Hamilton Field Naturalists Club	1958	Hamilton	The club's logo is the endangered Eastern Barred Bandicoot (Perameles gunnii), which was adopted in 1976. The club has been integral to the conservation efforts for the bandicoot, which they started in 1980. The bandicoot can now only be found in the Victorian wild in the Hamilton Parkland wildlife enclosure, in which the club works alongside Parks Victoria and other government and non-government organisations to continue the conservation efforts.	Club website
Sale & District Field Naturalists		Sale	Holds monthly meetings and excursions. It has previous hosted camps for the South East Australian Naturalist Association, in collaboration with the Latrobe Valley Field Naturalists Club.	Club webpage
St Arnaud Field Naturalists Club	1984	St Arnaud	Holds monthly meetings and excursions. It also works closely with the Department of Environment, Land, Water and Planning and Parks Victoria to undertake conservation efforts in the region including nesting boxes and pest removal.	Club website
Warrnambool Field Naturalists Club	1958	Warrnambool	Holds monthly meetings and excursions, as well as excursions and camp trips around the local area. The club publishes the monthly Warrnambool Field Naturalists Club Newsletter and has previously published The Nature of Warrnambool authored by J.G. Douglas. The club acts has continually undertaken conservation efforts on protected nature reserves in the area, including Tower Hill, Goose Lagoon, Lake Pertobe, Deen Maar at Yambuk and the Framlingham forest.	Club webpage Warrnambool Field Naturalists Club Newsletter

== Western Australia ==
Name	Year founded	Location	Notes	Official Webpages
Western Australian Naturalists' Club	1924	Perth	The club is composed of several regional branches that encompass much of the greater Perth region. The club has published The Western Australian Naturalist twice-yearly since 1947.	Club website The Western Australian Naturalist
Busselton Naturalists Club		Busselton	Undertakes monthly meetings, excursions and conservation activities. In 2017 the club captured one of the few recordings of the Night Parrot's (Pezoporus occidentalis) calls during one of these excursions.	Club website
Goldfields Naturalists Club	1987	Goldfields	Undertakes regular meetings, excursions and conservation works, including a biological survey of Victoria Rock Nature Reserve in 1991.	Club webpage
Toodyay Naturalists Club	1968	Toodyay	Published several books exploring flora and fauna in the region, including A guide to exploring Toodyay... naturally (2018).	Club website

== Other Australian natural science and conservation organisations ==
Name	Year founded	Location	Notes	Official Webpages
South East Australian Naturalist Association (SEANA)	1996	South-East Australian Region	Formerly the Victorian Field Naturalists Club Association (VFNCA), SEANA serves as a host organisation to assist communication between the field naturalist clubs in the South-Eastern Australian Region. The association organises biannual camp trips that are hosted and ran by the location's regional field naturalist club. These events are heavily attended by club members and generally also involve large conservation activities in the area.	Association website
Australian Naturalists' Network	1987-1988	Australia-wide	Created in collaboration with the Geelong Field Naturalists Club and the VFNCA (which later became SEANA) as an Australia-wide project to bring field naturalists and conservation groups together. The network runs two primary projects, a Register of Clubs for all members, and biennial camping trips to locations across the country.	Network website
