= Queensland Naturalists Club =

The Queensland Naturalists' Club Inc. was founded in Queensland as the Queensland Field Naturalists Club in 1906 to encourage the study, appreciation and preservation of Queensland’s flora and fauna and its environments. It has been known as the Queensland Naturalists Club from 1922. The Queensland Gould League of Bird Lovers joined the club in 1922. It organises field trips and excursions. The club is a member of the Australian Naturalists' Network.

Its motto is "Poetry of earth is never dead". Its symbol is the bunya pine tree (Arucaria Bidwilli).

Its members have included artist Estelle Thomson.

== History ==
The Queensland Naturalists’ Club can trace its ancestry back to 1859, when the Queensland Philosophical Society was founded. Its main object was “The discussion of scientific subjects, with special reference to the natural history, soil, climate and agriculture of the colony of Queensland”. Its greatest achievement was the foundation of the Queensland Museum. It did not hold excursions but many of its meetings were devoted to exhibits. The first Chairman was Dr F.J. Barton; one of the founders and a frequent exhibitor was Silvester Diggles

In 1883, when membership was at a low ebb, it was decided to re-form as a new society, the Royal Society of Queensland “for the furtherance of Natural Science and its application”. Its first President was A.C. Gregory and its first Secretary was Henry Tryon. In 1886 Tryon initiated a Field Naturalists’ Section of the Royal Society, which started with about fifty members. The chairman was F.M. Bailey, Colonial Botanist (q.v.); six of its members were to become members of our Club (R. Illidge, J.R. Sankey, J. Shirley, J.H. Simmonds, H. Tryon, A.J. Turner). Tryon’s zoological group soon disbanded but, under Bailey’s genial and inspiring leadership, a botanical group of eight or nine held fortnightly excursions. By 1889 they had collected over 800 species of plants from the Brisbane district alone and published many of their findings in the Society’s proceedings. Excursions in 1891 and 1894 to Yandina, Eudlo and Eumundi explored the big scrubs being felled as the new railway line advanced towards Gympie.

Meanwhile Tryon became first President of a new group, The Natural History Society of Queensland, which in January 1892 held its first fortnightly meeting in the library of the Museum (then in William St). Its objects were to promote the study of natural history, the investigation of the geology, flora, fauna, etc., of the colony, and the dissemination of the knowledge acquired. This society was primarily entomological with some geology and very little botany. More than half the papers read to it and very many exhibits were entomological and all its presidents were entomologists. Tryon was succeeded by Dr T.F. Lucas (of pawpaw ointment fame). R. Illidge and Dr A.J. Turner (q.v.). After 1896 meetings ceased.

In 1906, the Royal Society, with the help of the Teachers’ Union, organised a Nature Study Exhibition at the Technical College on the nights of 9-12 January. The interest generated among scientists and teachers led to the formation of a new group, and on 6 April 1906 the inaugural meeting of the Field Naturalists’ Club was held. There were fifty foundation members, of whom about half were teachers; membership more than doubled within two years. From its foundation, our Club has been an important force in the study of natural history in Queensland.

The new Club had its steady body of supporters. The first Council comprised Professor Sydney B.J. Skertchly, President; Henry Tryon, Vice-President; James Johnston, Secretary; Miss E.A. Fewings, Messrs A. Exley, L.C. Green and F. Hurworth, Council members. All but Skertchly and Tryon were teachers. Before the year was out, C.W. Holland from the Lands Department had been appointed Assistant and he continued as Secretary 1907-1912. In his inaugural address, Skertchly stressed the point that this was a Club, not a Society, and he continually urged the cultivation of what he called “Clubability”. This has continued to be the character of the Club. In 1915 the biologist Freda Bage was made president of the Club, owing to her research and interest in local fauna and flora.

One of the strengths of the Club has been its scientific basis. Skertchly was a geologist, Tryon a Government Entomologist. The leadership of University staff and other professional scientists has continued with about half the presidents drawn from these groups. Association with the Queensland Museum and Queensland Herbarium has been close; many of their staff have been Club members and often leaders in its activities, while other Club members in turn have cooperated in collecting specimens for the two institutions. In recent years the proportion of professional scientists appears to have declined somewhat. Two factors are important here: the change of emphasis in scientific studies from field work and the natural history approach to laboratory and high-technology studies, and the striking increase in skilled and dedicated amateurs in the areas of natural history and conservation. In a number of individual cases, professional qualifications and occupation in one field of science have meant skilled application as an “amateur” in another area; a professor of earth sciences and expert on volcanoes is, as a naturalist, an authority on Queensland cicadas; a lecturer in anatomy of large animals is an expert on the local birds and their behaviour.

Since its inception the Club has had a strong emphasis on excursions and field studies. At first, half-day or full-day excursions were held, usually on a Saturday. Gradually camps and extended excursions were added, and members have visited sites throughout our own area of south-east Queensland and have recorded their observations, in some cases being able to note changes in the ecology of a place over a period; the Christmas Creek area, for example, was visited by the Club in 1941 and again in 1991, with interesting changes noted. Regular day or week-end excursions have been augmented by long excursions to areas on the islands of Moreton Bay, the Great Barrier Reef, Cape York Peninsula and inland Queensland; in recent years excursions to Tasmania, to south-east Asia and to the south Pacific have provided interest, pleasure, and some new scientific information. Some changes have taken place over the years, perhaps most obviously in costume; women members no longer climb mountains in the long voluminous skirts of the early days, while none of the men these days attend in suits and ties.

The Club has changed its name twice. From the Field Naturalists’ Club, it became The Queensland Naturalists’ Club and Nature-lovers’ League in 1922. Although separately administered, the Nature-Lovers’ League was organised by the senior club to encourage the interest of children in nature study, mainly by talks and field studies for teachers and trainee teachers. Juniors could purchase for a penny a handsome certificate of membership. The pledge was “I promise to protect all worthy native Birds, Animals and Plants, and to encourage the study of Natural History”; perhaps goannas were not “worthy” animals. From 1938 to 1940, about 9 000 certificates were sold, mainly at the Queensland Museum, but after this activity waned, and by 1949 the Club was titled as now, The Queensland Naturalists’ Club. More recently, for several years the Club presented Junior Naturalist’s Awards to young members who satisfactorily completed natural history projects. In recent years, with the profusion of alternative entertainment and the pressure of school and social programmes, participation by children in Club activities has become much less. For many years the Club sponsored a Natural History Prize as part of the annual Science Contest for students conducted by the Science Teachers’ Association.

The Club’s emblem is a young bunya pine tree, which appeared on the cover of The Queensland Naturalist from 1921 to 1978, when it developed a second canopy. Bunya pines probably live to 400 or 500 years.

== Publications ==
The Club journal, The Queensland Naturalist, was first produced in 1908. It has provided a valuable record of Proceedings and Annual Reports and an even more valuable record of excursions and observations which are a great resource in conservation causes. Thus, reports from the Moreton Island excursions of 1908 and 1924 and from five Stradbroke Island excursions between 1917 and 1926 (together with accounts of birds seen at Stradbroke 1869-80 by Illidge and in 1927 by Mrs Mayo) have provided base-line data on which administrators, students and others can draw. There are valuable records, too, of habitats long vanished, such as the 166 species of plants recorded by Wedd from the Three Mile Scrub on an excursion to Newmarket in 1910. More recently, special issues devoted to long excursions such as Fraser Island, Cape Tribulation, Kroombit Tops, Scawfell Island and Bukkulla Conservation Park have provided useful records for those areas. An issue on the Coolum area was reprinted by the local conservation group to support its campaign for the preservation of Mt Coolum. There have been nine editors and about 350 contributors, most of them Club members. Fifty-one new species of flowering plants, fungi and insects have been described in the journal and more than two hundred species have been newly recorded for the State. An early issue (Vol.10 (2), published in 1937) includes description of three new species of orchid, a list of twenty-seven species of cowrie from Emu Park and Yeppoon including several undescribed species sent to the Australian Museum, detailed botanical notes on Murchie’s Scrub near Rosevale, and bird records from One Tree Hill (Mt Coot-tha). The issue of July 1985 includes a description of a new species of the saprophytic flowering plant Thismia, a new record for Australia of the fungal genus Xenosporium, other new fungal records for Queensland, and fauna studies from Heron Island and Burdekin River.

Copies of the Queensland Naturalist spanning 1915 to 1954 are in the public domain. They may be accessed via the Biodiversity Heritage Library

The Club has published handbooks on Queensland natural history. Four such volumes have been published so far:

- Introduction to the mushrooms Toadstools and larger fungi of Queensland by J.E.C.Aberdeen (1979)
- Seaweeds of Queensland a naturalists Guide by A.B. Cribb (1996)
- A Brisbane Bushland, the history and natural history of Enoggera Reservoir and its environs, edited by Helen Horton (2002)
- Quick Identification Series Nos. 1 to 18 compiled by John Horton
- To commemorate the life and work of C.T. White (q.v.) the Club in 1952 inaugurated as a memorial the C.T. White Lecture, given annually by distinguished lecturers, the lecture to be then published in The Queensland Naturalist. The first of these lectures was given by D.A. Herbert (q.v.).
- In 1992, the Club initiated The Queensland Natural History Award, a bronze medallion mounted on a block of bunya pine timber, presented annually to recognise outstanding contributions to natural history in Queensland.
- In 2020 the club commenced preparation of a comprehensive field guide to dragonflies and damselflies (odonata). The impetus for this project was a substantial bequest by Denniss Reeves to be expended in education concerning odonata. Denniss Reeves was president of the club and a long term member.

== Preservation and protection ==
The Club has a wide range of interests and expertise. Interchange of knowledge between birdwatcher and botanist, geologist and entomologist is as important as interchange between professional and amateur. This breadth of knowledge is valuable in developing a comprehensive view of an area or an issue and has made the Club as a whole qualified to comment on many issues in natural history and conservation. Its influence has been through a reasoned, unemotional and constructive approach to Ministers or other relevant authorities, although sometimes wide publicity, in combination with other groups, has been necessary. Early initiatives included an unsuccessful attempt to have the Glasshouse Mountains preserved as a National Park. The Lamington National Park was proclaimed in 1915, largely due to the efforts of Romeo Lahey, a Club member. After the First World War, the Club played a considerable part in publicising the little-known area and assisting planning for its management, holding its first excursion to the new park .in 1918; a party of eleven camped two nights at Bithongabel, guided by Herbert O’Reilly, an experience which was commemorated in 1966 by the unveiling of a plaque by Alec Chisholm. Other campaigns in which the Club has played an active role include the preservation of the Samford Bora Ground and the prevention of sand mining on Fraser Island. In the 1920s and 1930s there were campaigns against open seasons for koalas and possums. Somewhat surprisingly, in 1929 “owing to representations from this Club, protection that had been given to the iguana was rescinded”; this needs to be seen against the contemporary background of deep-felt concern for the survival of native birds. In 1911 the Club held a display of wildflowers and other plants at a conversazione for members and this developed into a series of annual Wildflower shows open to the public, continuing from 1918 and 1936. This function is now filled by the Society for Growing Australian Plants.

== Award ==
Since 1992 it has annually awarded a Queensland Natural History Award.

== See also ==
- Field Naturalists Club of Victoria
- Field Naturalists Society of South Australia
- Western Australian Naturalists' Club
- List of Australian field naturalist clubs
- Dendrobium fleckeri and Dendrobium carrii, species first identified by Queensland Naturalists Club members
