= Field Naturalists Club of Victoria =

Organization in Victoria, Australia

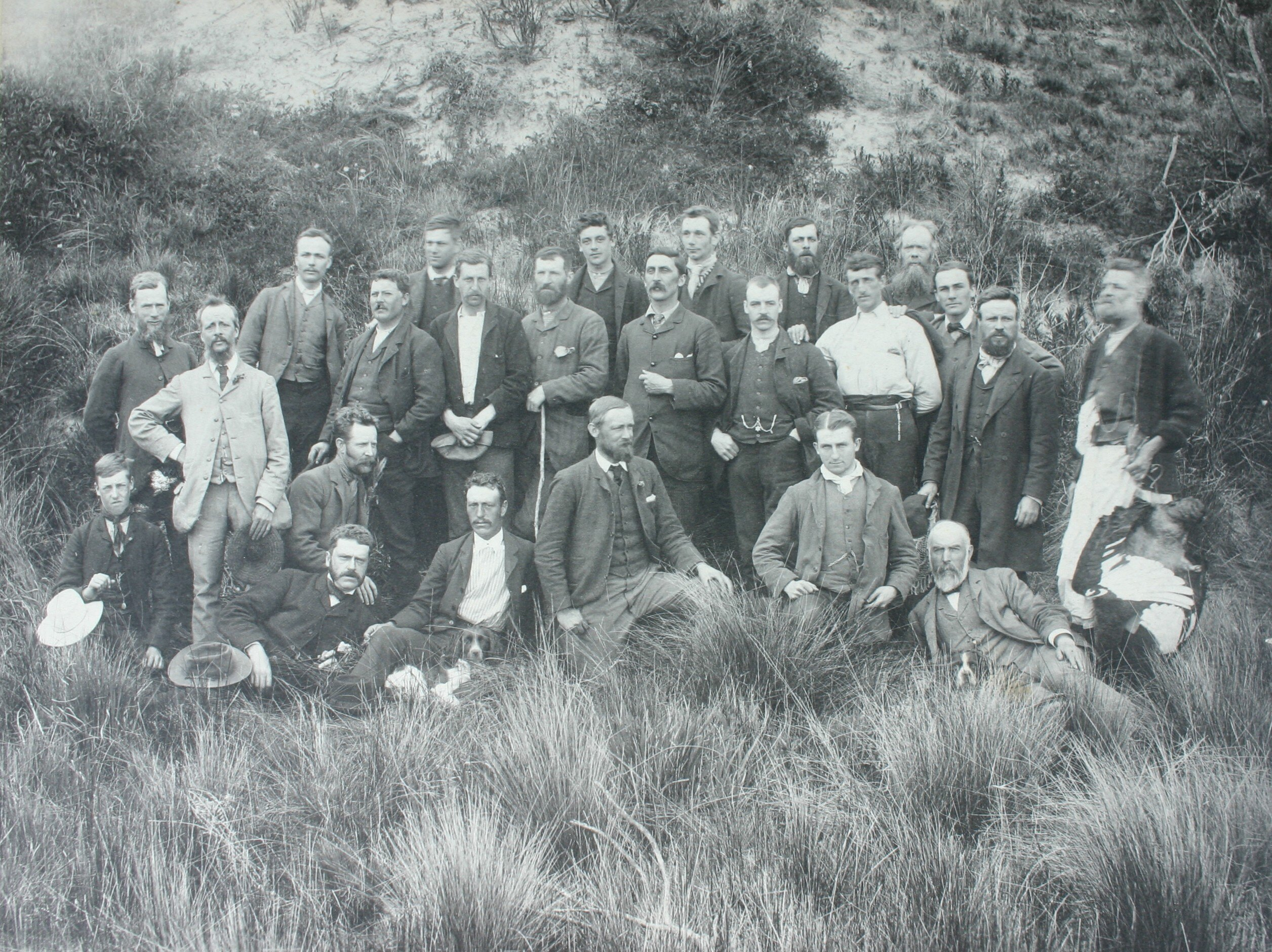
- Field Naturalists' Club of Victoria expedition group, King Island, 1887

- Location within Melbourne
- Abbreviation: FNCV
- Formation: May 1880; 146 years ago
- Founders: Thomas Pennington Lucas; Johann George Luehmann; Charles French; Dudley Best
- Type: Nonprofit; member-based
- Legal status: Registered charity
- Purpose: Environmentalism
- Headquarters: 1 Gardenia St, Blackburn, Melbourne, 3130
- Location: Victoria, Australia
- Coordinates: 37°49′16″S 145°09′06″E
- Services: Australian natural history and conservation
- Methods: Scientific research; Citizen science projects
- Members: 763 (2025)
- President: Maxwell Campbell
- Main organ: Council
- Publication: The Victorian Naturalist
- Website: fncv.org.au

The Field Naturalists Club of Victoria (FNCV) is an Australian natural history and conservation organisation. The club is the oldest of its kind in Australia and is unique in having existed continuously since its foundation. Since its founding, the club has drawn its membership from the ranks of both amateur naturalists and professional scientists. This dual stream of members has continued into the 21st century, in which the club is well known for not only its scientific research output, but also numerous ongoing citizen science projects.

Since 1940 the FNCV has awarded the Australian Natural History Medallion to the person judged to have made the most meritorious contribution to the understanding of Australian natural history. Past winners include: Alex Chisholm (1940), Helen Aston (1979), Jack Hyett (1985), and Richard Shine (2009).

The FNCV is situated at 1 Gardenia St, Blackburn, in Melbourne's eastern suburbs. A range of services is available for members, including a bookshop.

== Current activities ==
Currently there are ten special interest groups within the FNCV: Bats, Botany, Day, Fauna Survey, Fungi, Geology, Marine Research, Microscopy, Terrestrial Invertebrates, and Juniors. The Day group aims to provide a generalist, high quality natural history program that invites speakers from inside and outside the club to undertake lectures and excursions around the state. Accounting for both the special interest groups, and Day Group, the FNCV holds weekly member events, including lectures, tours, excursions and conservation activities throughout the year.

The FNCV works closely with government and not-for-profit conservation and natural history organisations, to monitor and protect key biodiverse areas in the state. This includes an ongoing research project with Parks Victoria, studying endangered malleefowls in Mallee country in the north of the state. The club's Fauna Survey special interest group has also been studying the population numbers of the endangered regent parrot, identifying a notable population increase in Hattah-Kulkyne National Park while on an excursion. The club has also notable a growing population of the critically endangered swift parrot in Deep Lead Nature Conservation Reserve, while undertaking a long-term population study in collaboration with Parks Victoria.

== History ==
The FNCV was founded in May 1880 by a group of nature enthusiasts that included medical practitioner Thomas Pennington Lucas, botanist and curator of the National Herbarium of Victoria, Johann George Luehmann, Charles French, and Dudley Best. The club worked closely with the Royal Society of Victoria, with which it shared a large percentage of its membership.

The club's first president, palaeontologist and zoologist, Frederick McCoy, was also the first director of the National Museum of Victoria (now Museums Victoria). The two organisations have maintained a close working relationship since that founding period, with many curators and staff playing key roles in the club.

Since its founding, the club has played a critical role in founding and maintaining Victoria's key biodiversity regions through conservation efforts and lobbying government bodies. This includes the club's establishment of Wilsons Promontory National Park, in collaboration with the Royal Society of Victoria in 1898. The FNCV has maintained a watching brief over the park for over 120 years. The club also played a key role in founding Croajingolong National Park, the Little Desert National Park and the box-ironbark forests.

The FNCV has played key roles in founding conservation and natural history organisations across the country. Many regional field naturalist clubs in Victoria can trace their founding back to FNCV members starting offshoot clubs for their local region, including the Bendigo Field Naturalists Club, the Peninsula Field Naturalists' Club, and the Latrobe Valley Field Naturalists Club. To foster organisation between the Victoria clubs, the FNCV established the Victorian Field Naturalists Clubs Association, which is now the South East Australian Naturalists Association, one of the largest amateur science and conservation organisations in Australia.

== Publications ==
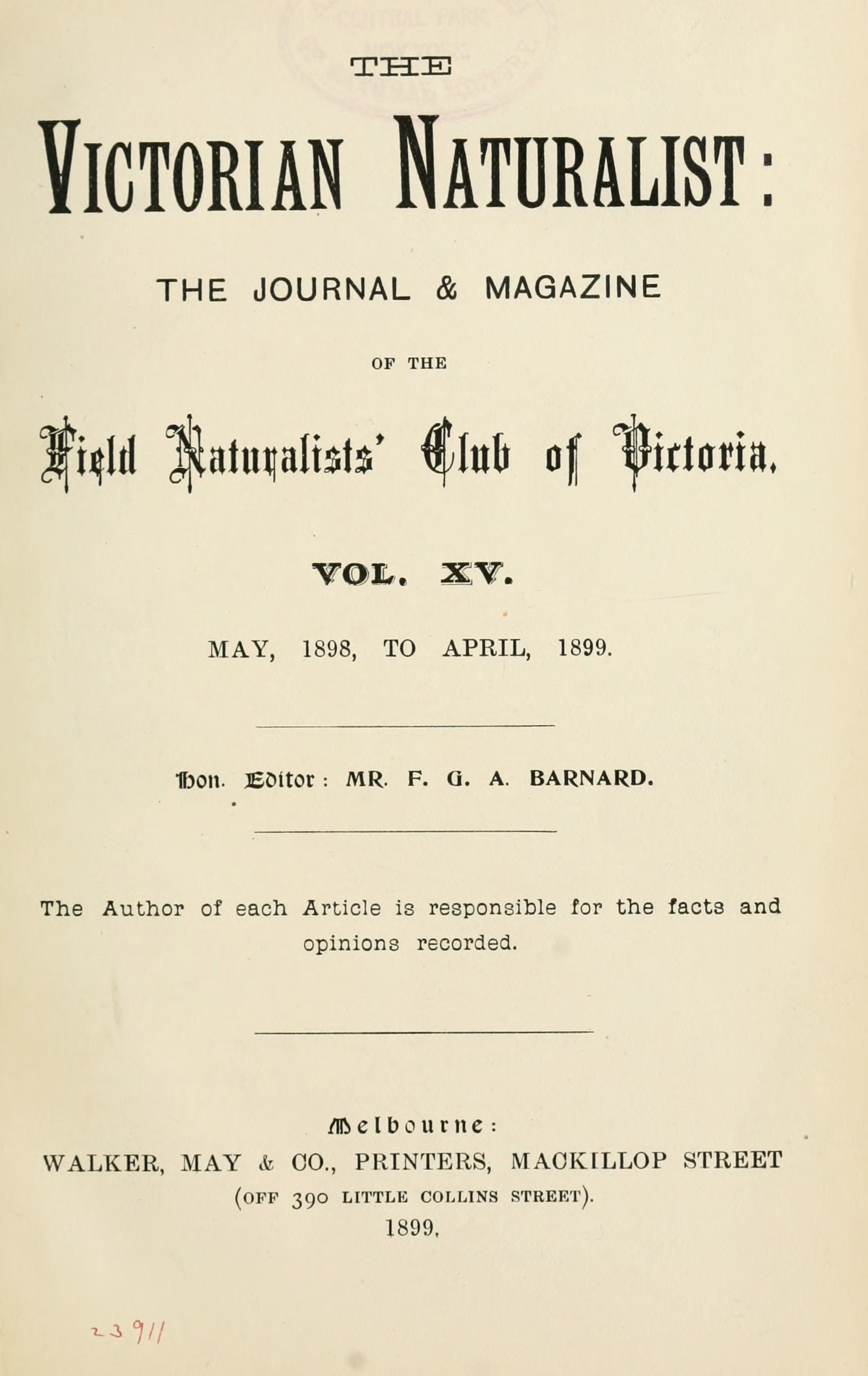
The title page of The Victorian Naturalist vol.15 1898–1899

Since 1884 it has published the bimonthly scientific research journal, The Victorian Naturalist. The journal contains scientific research reports, contributions, naturalist notes and book reviews. Although the journal predominantly focuses on Victorian natural history, submissions are accepted Australia-wide, on all natural history subjects. Ferdinand von Mueller published many of his first descriptions in this journal, including Agapetes meiniana, Oldenlandia psychotrioides, Morinda hypotephra, Phyllanthus hypospodius and Wendlandia basistaminea.

The club has produced a monthly newsletter, the Field Nats News, since 1991, which contains club activity and excursion reports, internal notices for club members and member-submitted articles.

The history of the club and their conservation work has been published by the club in Leaves from Our History: the Field Naturalists Club of Victoria, 1880-2005, and its follow-up publication Understanding our natural world: the Field Naturalists Club of Victoria 1880-2015.

== Presidents ==
The following people have served as presidents of the FNCV:

Order	Name	Term began	Term ended	Time in office	Notes
1	Frederick McCoy	1880	1883	2–3 years	
2	Frank Dobson	1883	1884	0–1 years	
	Arthur Henry Shakespeare Lucas	1887	1889	1–2 years	
	Walter Baldwin Spencer	1891	1893	1–2 years	
	Charles Arthur Topp	1889	1890	0–1 years	
	Thomas Sergeant Hall	1901	1903	1–2 years	
	Francis George Allman Barnard	1905	1907	1–2 years	
	George Arthur Keartland	1907	1909	1–2 years	
	Edward Edgar Pescott	1926	1928	1–2 years	
	Charles Barrett	1930	1931	0–1 years	
	Stanley Robert Mitchell	1936	1937	0–1 years	
	Philip Crosbie Morrison	1941	1943	1–2 years	
	Ina Watson	1947	1948	0–1 years	First female president
	Maxwell Campbell	2014	incumbent	11–12 years	

== Regional groups ==
The FNCV has informal links to a number of regional field naturalist groups across Victoria, including:

- Field Naturalists' Club of Ballarat
- Bendigo Field Naturalists Club
- Castlemaine Field Naturalists Club
- Portland Field Naturalists Club
- Geelong Field Naturalists Club
- Maryborough Field Naturalists Club
- Peninsula Field Naturalists' Club
- Latrobe Valley Field Naturalists Club

== See also ==
- Field Naturalists Society of South Australia
- Western Australian Naturalists' Club
- Queensland Naturalists Club
- List of Australian field naturalist clubs
