= Ludwig Glauert =

Australian paleontologist, herpetologist and museum curator (1879–1963)

Ludwig Glauert MBE (5 May 1879 – 1 February 1963) was a British-born Australian paleontologist, herpetologist and museum curator. He is known for work on Pleistocene mammal fossils, and as a museum curator who played an important role in natural science of Western Australia.

Glauert was born in Ecclesall, Sheffield, England. His father was Johann Ernst Louis Henry Glauert, merchant and cutlery manufacturer, and his mother was Amanda, née Watkinson. He was educated in Sheffield at Sheffield Royal Grammar School, at Firth University College and the Technical School, studying geology, becoming a Fellow of the Geological Society of London in 1900.

In 1908 he and his wife migrated to Perth, Western Australia, where he joined the Geological Survey there as a paleontologist, working to arrange the collections of the Western Australian Museum. In 1910 he became part of the permanent staff of the museum and in 1914 was promoted to Keeper of Geology and Ethnology. From 1909 to 1915 he carried out fieldwork at the Margaret River caves, finding fossils of several species of extinct monotremes and marsupials in the Pleistocene limestone there.

He was a member of the Western Australian Naturalists Club and published regularly in the West Australian Naturalist as well as in Western Mail in 'The Naturalist' columns

He was appointed MBE in the 1960 New Year Honours.

Glauert died in Perth.

Varanus glauerti, a species of Australian monitor lizard is named in his honor.

== Awards ==
- 1948 Australian Natural History Medallion

== See also ==
- Category:Taxa named by Ludwig Glauert
