= Latrobe Valley Field Naturalists Club =

Regional organisation in Victoria, Australia

The Latrobe Valley Field Naturalists Club (Latrobe Valley FNC) is an Australian regional scientific natural history and conservation society. It is based in the Latrobe Valley in Victoria and draws members from across western, central and southern Gippsland.

The Latrobe Valley FNC was created in 1960 to encourage the enjoyment of nature and to help preserve the region's flora, fauna and natural habitat. Its motto is "to protect and enjoy".

The club supports a wide range of conservation and environmental projects throughout the region, including monitoring threatened species and conducting plant and animal surveys in areas of high conservation value.

The current emblem of the Latrobe Valley FNC was designed by artist Beatrice Rowles and features the flying duck-orchid (Caleana major). The Australian grass tree (Xanthorrhoea australis) has also been used in the club's branding, including a 1965 car sticker that was sold at field naturalist camps across Australia.

== Current activities ==
The Latrobe Valley FNC holds monthly meetings from January to November, usually on the fourth Friday of the month. Meetings usually include a guest speaker presenting on a natural history or conservation topic. Members and visitors are welcome to attend both the meetings and the monthly excursions, which are usually held the day after the monthly meetings. The club also organises spring and summer field camps and has two special interest groups, a Botany Group and a Bird Group, which hold their own meetings, field trips and surveys.

The club is a member of the South East Australian Naturalists Association and has previously hosted several of the association's biannual naturalist club camps. The Latrobe Valley FNC works closely with other field naturalist clubs in the region, hosting camps, excursions and guest lectures for the Castlemaine Field Naturalists Club, Field Naturalists' Club of Ballarat and Peninsula Field Naturalists' Club. The club is also a member of the Australian Naturalists' Network.

The Latrobe Valley FNC has continued to contribute to the Australian Natural History Medallion Trust Fund.

== History ==
The Latrobe Valley FNC was formed in February 1960 at a public meeting in Morwell sponsored by the Morwell and District Horticultural Society. The concept of a regional field naturalist club in the Latrobe Valley was proposed by members of the Field Naturalists Club of Victoria (FNCV) who has visited the 1959 Morwell Horticultural Show. FNCV members assisted in the club formation and have continued to support and work closely with the Latrobe Valley FNC since then. Originally called the Gippsland Field Naturalists Club, the name was changed to the Latrobe Valley Field Naturalists Club in early 1961. Notable founding members of the Latrobe Valley FNC include botanist and Australian Natural History Medallion recipient Jean Galbraith, Don Lyndon and Medal of the Order of Australia recipient Ellen Lyndon, who received the award in recognition for her work with both the Latrobe Valley FNC and the FNCV.

The club has worked throughout its history to establish and protect nature reserves in the region, including the Morwell National Park, which was established by a 1967 Act of Parliament, and Holey Plains State Park, which was declared in 1973.

Club members Ellen Lyndon and Jim Peterson lobbied the National Parks Authority and Land Conservation Council to conserve Morwell National Park, which was a tree orchard in Yinnar South in the 1950s, due to the unique plant and animal life that lived in it, including the rare butterfly orchid (Sarcochilus australis), identified by club members Eulalie and Os Brewster. In 1982, a report by the Land Conservation Council recommended the park be reassessed as a Flora and Fauna Reserve, which had much less conservation protection as a national park. Club members, including Lyndon, came together to protect the park's conservation status, eventually assisting in the purchase of nearby land to ensure the land size was sustainable as a national park. In 1986 the Friends of Morwell National Park, including many members of the club, was established. The long-term conservation of the park of was secured in 1987, when the Minister for Conservation, Forests and Lands, Joan Kirner, visited the park in recognition of its significance and met with members of the Latrobe Valley FNC and Friends of Morwell. The club has continued to work with the Friends of Morwell and support conservation of the land, including seed planting initiatives and publishing nature guides of local species.

In recognition of Ellen Lyndon's efforts to develop and conserve the Morwell National Park, Lyndon's Clearing on the Fosters Gully Nature Trail was named in her honour.

== Publications ==
The Latrobe Valley FNC publishes a bimonthly magazine, the Latrobe Valley Naturalist, which has been published continuously since 1963. Issues include short articles, details of upcoming events, and reports of excursions, camps, meetings and presentations. In 1986 the club received official thanks from the General Manager of the Victorian Department of Conservation, Forests and Lands, complementing the quality and significance of the magazine. The club's publications have also received compliments from the Field Naturalists Club of Victoria for the "information and detailed introduction to the history and geology of the Latrobe Region".

The club and its members have published a number of books, nature guides and leaflets, discussing the natural history and ecological of the region. These publications include:

- Wildflowers of Victoria (1967) by Jean Galbraith
- History of the Latrobe Valley Field Naturalists Club: 1960-1985 (1985) by Ellen Lyndon
- Flowers and Ferns of Morwell National Park (1997) by Ken Harris
- Latrobe Region Nature Guide (2001) by the Latrobe Valley FNC
- Plants of Significance to the Ganai Community (2001) by Rob de Souza-Daw, Ken Harris and Doris Paton
- The Nature of Latrobe: A guide to the parks and reserves in the Latrobe Region (2009) by the Latrobe Valley FNC
- Gippsland Lady Botanists (2007) by Terri Gitsham Allen
- To protect and enjoy: the first fifty years of the Latrobe Valley Field Naturalists Club: 1960-2010 (2010) by the Latrobe Valley FNC
