= Francis Barnard =

Francis Barnard may refer to:

- Francis Stillman Barnard (1856–1936), Canadian parliamentarian and lieutenant governor of British Columbia
- Francis Barnard (English cricketer) (1902–1996), English cricketer
- Francis Jones Barnard (1829–1889), British Columbia businessman and member of parliament
- Francis George Allman Barnard (1857–1932), Australian naturalist, pharmacist, Victorian cricketer and mayor
