= Whipstick =

Whipstick Bendigo, Victoria
- Coordinates: 36°39′29″S 144°16′15″E
- Population: 10 (2016 census)
- Postcode(s): 3556
- LGA(s): City of Greater Bendigo
- State electorate(s): Bendigo East
- Federal division(s): Bendigo

Whipstick is a locality in the City of Greater Bendigo, Victoria, Australia. At the 2016 census, Whipstick had a population of 10.

The Whipstick is an area of conservation significance and has long been of interest to local naturalists, particularly members of the Victorian Field Naturalist Club and the Ballarat Field Naturalist Club. Species observations from the Whipstick were published in The Victorian Naturalist as early as 1888. The long association with the region has resulted in a large body of data documenting changes in distribution and abundance across time, as well as the appearance of introduced species.
