= Field Naturalists Society of South Australia =

The Field Naturalists Society of South Australia was founded in 1883 as a section of the Royal Society of South Australia, and whose aims were to further the cause of the natural sciences in the colony. It was incorporated in 1959 and is still active. Membership is open to the public on application.

The club is a member of the Australian Naturalists' Network.

== History ==
In 1880 Samuel Way, president of the Adelaide Philosophical Society, which had just recently been granted permission to use the title "Royal Society of South Australia", lamented the lack of a local equivalent of the recently formed Field Naturalists Club of Victoria for keen amateurs to further the cause of natural sciences.

The Association was formed as the "Field Naturalists' Section of the Royal Society of South Australia" (note apostrophe) on 14 November 1883, rules adopted and officers elected, many or most being members of the Royal Society: Chairman: Professor Ralph Tate; Vice-chairmen: Dr H. T. Whittell, and Rev. (later Professor) Walter Howchin FGS.; Hon. Secretary: W. E. Pickells. The foundation committee consisted of Dr W. L. Cleland, Dr W. Haacke, J. G. O. Tepper, A. Molineux, W. H. Selway, jun., G. Collis, jun., H. Dean, and G. F. Hussey. Another founding member of long standing was W. H. Baker. The first outing was to the Government Farm, Belair, on 24 November 1883.

=== Chairmen (or presidents) of the Society ===
- Samuel Dixon 1890,1891
- Robert H. Perks 1895
- Stirling Smeaton (when?)
- Edwin Ashby 1899
- E. Angas Johnson 1902–1904
- E. H. Lock 1904–1906. also 1912–1914. Lock was a foundation member of the Society.
- John McConnell Black 1906 (author of The Naturalized Flora of South Australia)
- W. H. Selway 1908–1910
- Dr Robert Pulleine 1911
- E. H. Lock 1912–1914
- Capt. S. A. White 1914 ornithologist
- W. Ham 1922
- J. B. Cleland 1924
- Edwin Sawle Hughes 1925
- W. Champion Hackett 1926–1928
- H. M. Hale 1928, 1929
- Ernest H. Ising 1931–1933
- Rev. H. A. Gunter 1935
- Prof. J. B. Cleland 1936,1937
- K. W. Dunstone 1944
- George Pattison 1946
- Frederic J. W. Swann 1947,1948
- T. R. N. Lothian 1949–1951

=== The Society claims to have been instrumental in establishing ===
The Society claims to have been instrumental in establishing the following protected areas.

- Belair National Park in 1891,
- Flinders Chase (now part of the Flinders Chase National Park) on Kangaroo Island in 1919
- Ferries McDonald Conservation Park
- Spring Gully Conservation Park
- Clements Gap Conservation Park
- Piccaninnie Ponds Conservation Park
- Monarto Conservation Park
- Deep Creek Conservation Park
- Black Hill Conservation Park
- Cox Scrub Conservation Park
- Mount Taylor Conservation Park
- Nixon-Skinner Conservation Park at Myponga
- Kaiser Stuhl Conservation Park
- Charleston Conservation Park
- Para Wirra Recreation Park

=== Properties owned by the Society ===
The Society owns a number of nature reserves, covered by heritage agreements:

- Manning Reserve, 45 ha of dense natural vegetation near McLaren Vale
- Forest Range Reserve, 15 ha of sclerophyll woodland of the higher Mount Lofty Ranges
- Nicholls reserve, 58 ha of coastal scrub at Carpenter Rocks in the South East
- Tookayerta Marsh, a section of natural swamp near Nangkita

== Publications ==
- The South Australian Naturalist : the journal of the field naturalists' section of the Royal society of South Australia, of which volumes 1-5 are available in full at BHL.

== See also ==
- List of Australian field naturalist clubs
