= Paphia (plant) =

Scientific classification
- Kingdom: Plantae
- Clade: Tracheophytes
- Clade: Angiosperms
- Clade: Eudicots
- Clade: Asterids
- Order: Ericales
- Family: Ericaceae
- Subfamily: Vaccinioideae
- Tribe: Vaccinieae
- Genus: Paphia; Seem. (1864)

Type species
- Paphia vitiensis Seem.

Species
- 21 accepted species; see text

Genus of plants

Paphia is a genus of flowering plants in family Ericaceae. It includes 21 species which range from New Guinea to Queensland, the Solomon Islands, New Caledonia, and Fiji.

Species include climbers and lianas, scandent epiphytes, shrubs, and one arborescent species, Paphia alberti-eduardii. Members of the genus are distinguished by flowers in fascicles, with a calyx that is not winged and typically articulated with the pedicel. Filaments and anthers of alternating stamens are similar, and tubules on the anthers are well-developed.

Sixteen species are native to New Guinea, all of which are endemic to the island. They grow in montane forests, including mossy forest, forest edges, and subalpine thickets, from 1300 to 3800 meters elevation.

The genus was first described by Berthold Carl Seemann in 1864, with the type species Paphia vitiensis. Many of the species in the genus were formerly classed in genus Agapetes, and were reclassified by Peter F. Stevens in 2004.

== Species ==
21 species are currently accepted.

- Paphia alberti-eduardii (Sleumer) P.F.Stevens – eastern New Guinea (Mount Albert Edward)
- Paphia brassii (Sleumer) P.F.Stevens – New Guinea
- Paphia carrii (Sleumer) P.F.Stevens – New Guinea
- Paphia costata (C.H.Wright) P.F.Stevens – New Guinea
- Paphia helenae (F.Muell.) Schltr. – eastern New Guinea
- Paphia kudukii (Veldkamp) P.F.Stevens – eastern New Guinea
- Paphia megaphylla P.F.Stevens – eastern New Guinea
- Paphia meiniana (F.Muell.) Schltr. – northeastern Queensland
- Paphia neocaledonica (Guillaumin) P.F.Stevens – New Caledonia
- Paphia paniensis S.Venter & Munzinger – New Caledonia
- Paphia prostrata (P.F.Stevens) P.F.Stevens – New Guinea
- Paphia rubrocalyx (Sleumer) P.F.Stevens – New Guinea
- Paphia sclerophylla (Sleumer) P.F.Stevens – eastern New Guinea
- Paphia shungolensis (P.F.Stevens) P.F.Stevens – New Guinea
- Paphia sleumeriana (P.F.Stevens) P.F.Stevens – eastern New Guinea
- Paphia stenantha Schltr. – eastern New Guinea
- Paphia viridiflora Schltr. – northeastern New Guinea
- Paphia vitiensis Seem. – Fiji (Viti Levu)
- Paphia vitis-idaea (Sleumer) P.F.Stevens – eastern New Guinea
- Paphia vulcanicola P.F.Stevens – Solomon Islands
- Paphia woodsii P.F.Stevens – eastern New Guinea
