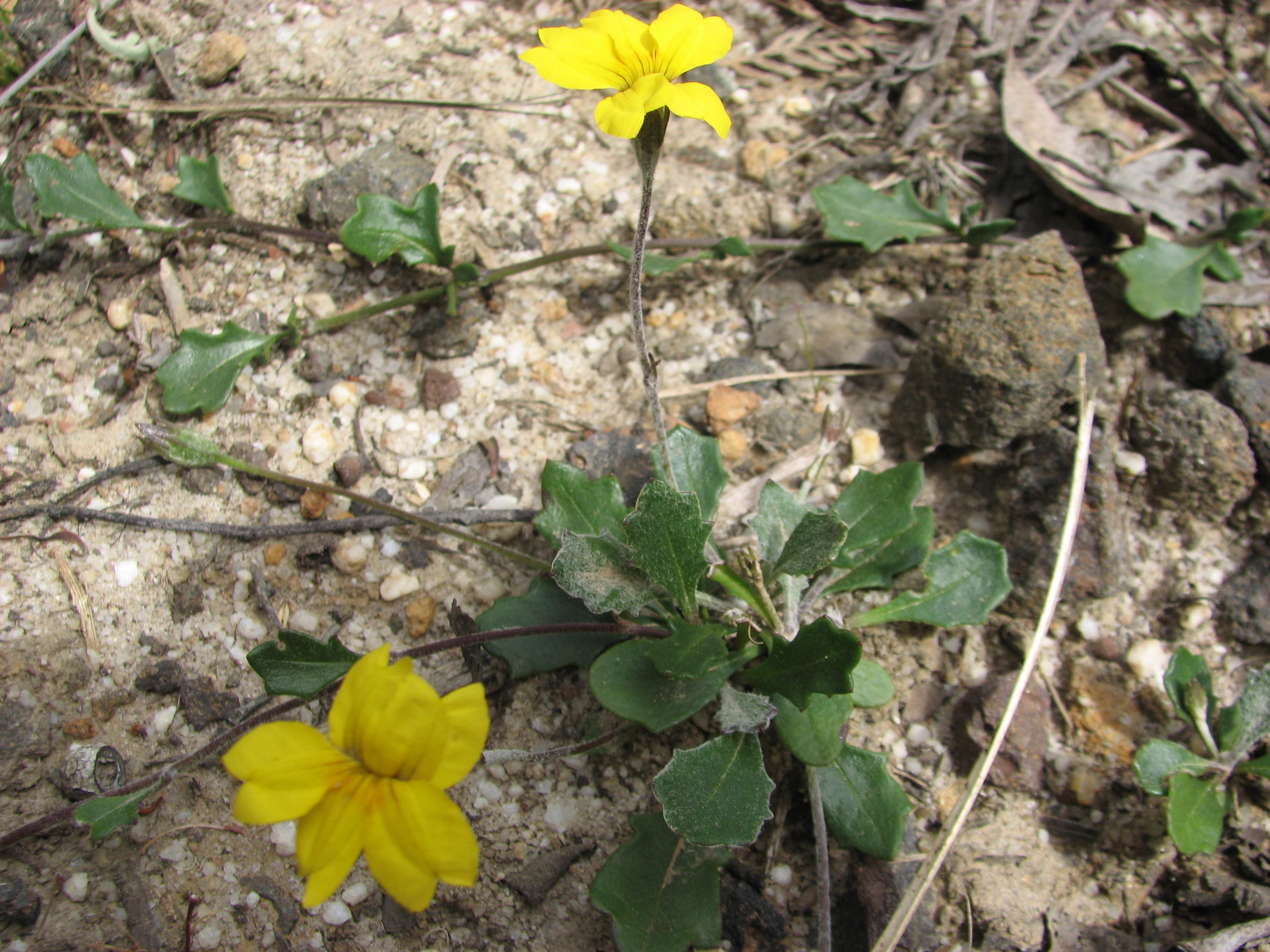
- In Great Otway National Park

Scientific classification
- Kingdom: Plantae
- Clade: Tracheophytes
- Clade: Angiosperms
- Clade: Eudicots
- Clade: Asterids
- Order: Asterales
- Family: Goodeniaceae
- Genus: Goodenia
- Species: G. lanata

Binomial name
- Goodenia lanata R.Br.

Synonyms
- Goodenia geniculata var. lanata (R.Br.) Rodway nom. illeg.

= Goodenia lanata =

Species of flowering plant

Goodenia lanata, commonly known as trailing goodenia in Victoria and native primrose in Tasmania, is a species of flowering plant in the family Goodeniaceae and is endemic to south-eastern Australia. It is a prostrate or low-lying perennial herb with hairy, egg-shaped leaves and racemes of yellow flowers.

== Description ==
Goodenia lanata is a low-lying to prostrate perennial herb with stems 30–50 cm (12–20 in) long and covered with soft, silvery-grey hairs. The leaves at the base of the plant are egg-shaped with the narrower end towards the base, toothed or lyrate, 10–80 mm (0.39–3.15 in) long and 5–20 mm (0.20–0.79 in) wide, the leaves on the stems similar but smaller. The flowers are arranged in racemes up to 200 mm (7.9 in) long on peduncles 20–60 mm (0.79–2.36 in) long with leaf-like bracts and linear bracteoles 3–5 mm (0.12–0.20 in) long, the individual flowers on pedicels 1–4 mm (0.039–0.157 in) long. The sepals are narrow oblong, 5–6 mm (0.20–0.24 in) long, the corolla yellow, 10–15 mm (0.39–0.59 in) long. The lower lobes of the corolla are 5–6 mm (0.20–0.24 in) long with wings about 2 mm (0.079 in) wide. Flowering mainly occurs from September to March and the fruit is an oval to cylindrical capsule 6–7 mm (0.24–0.28 in) long.

== Taxonomy ==
The species was first formally described in 1810 by botanist Robert Brown in Prodromus Florae Novae Hollandiae. The specific epithet (lanata) means "covered with tangled hairs".

== Distribution and habitat ==
Trailing goodenia grows in heath, grassy woodland and open forest. It occurs mainly in southern Victoria and is widespread in Tasmania.

== Cultural significance ==
Goodenia lanata is the emblem of the Field Naturalists' Club of Ballarat.
