= Winifred Waddell =

English-born Australian botanist

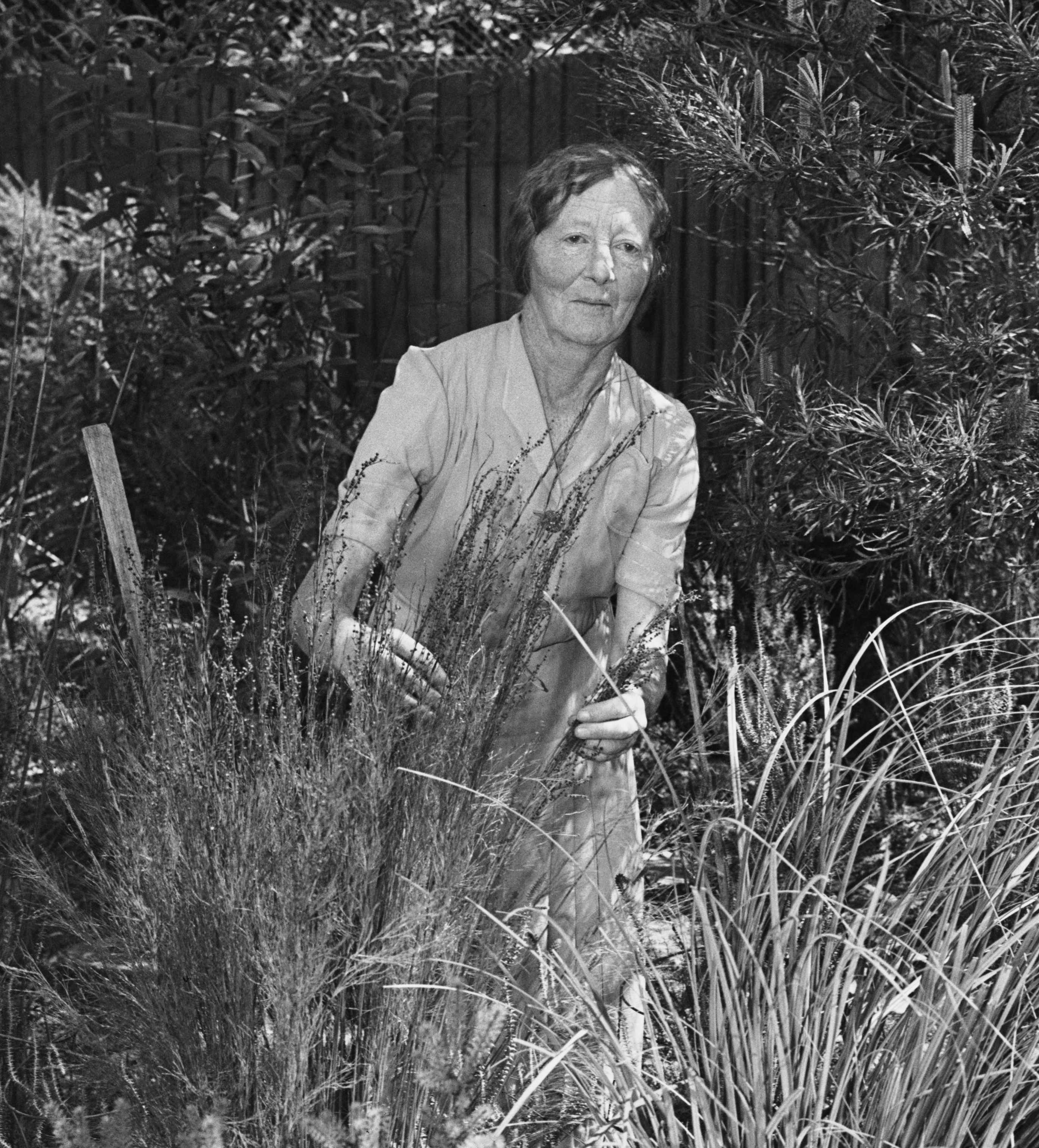
- Winifred Waddell, Melbourne, 1953
- Born: 8 October 1884; England
- Died: 1972
- Citizenship: Australian
- Scientific career
- Fields: botany

Winifred Waddell, MBE, (8 October 1884, Cumberland, England – 1972) was an English-born Australian botanist. She formed the Native Plants Preservation Society of Victoria, a society which was based on community dedicated to the preservation of Australian native plants. A Wildflower Sanctuary, named Winifred Waddell Wildflower Sanctuary.

== Early life ==
Waddell was the eldest of four children, born in an area called Head's Nook. She attended Carlisle High School for Girls, and won many prizes, including for mathematics and botany.

== Career ==
Waddell has hand coloured a number of water coloured engravings in a book called Illustrations of the British Flora: a series of wood engravings with dissection of British Plants.

Waddell noticed the disappearance of native flora and destruction of bushland in Victoria, and formed a Wildflower Preservation Group of the Field Naturalists Club of Victoria in 1952.

Waddell taught mathematics in Melbourne before she retired. She worked with native-plant preservation groups during the 1950s. "In all weathers you will find Miss Waddell peering round In odd places, on a disused railway line, in the middle of a racecourse, on the edge of an old gold mine in a lovely valley or in a creek bank for 'survivals'", noted one newspaper profile in 1954. She was responsible for securing the first wildflower sanctuary, at Tallarook, Victoria, in 1949.

== Awards ==
She was appointed MBE on 1 January 1964 for her work in preservation of natural flora. She was awarded the Australian Natural History Medallion of the Field Naturalist Club of Victoria.
