= Field Naturalists' Club of Ballarat =

Regional organisation in Victoria

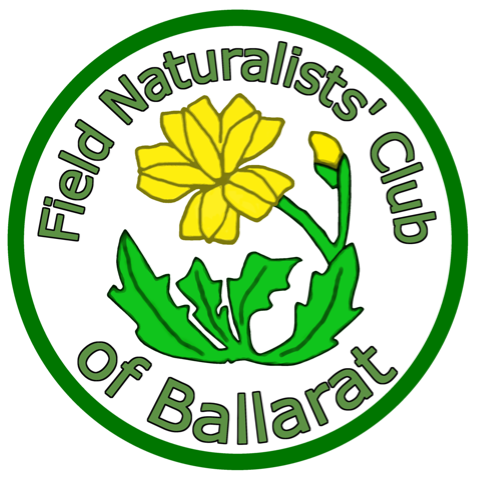
Emblem of the Field Naturalists Club of Ballarat, depicting the trailing goodenia.

The Field Naturalists' Club of Ballarat (FNCB) is an Australian regional scientific natural history and conservation society. The club was founded in 1952 (a continuation of the Field Club and Science Society) and is located in Ballarat, Victoria.

The primary objectives of the club are "to stimulate interest in natural history and to encourage the preservation and protection of the natural environment". Since the club's founding in 1952, it has contributed to several natural history databases, assisted in tree planting projects, lobbied for the preservation of environmentally significant public land, undertaken inventories of bush sites and provided information to students and researchers regarding the region’s natural heritage.

The emblem of the FNCB is Goodenia lanata, commonly known as the trailing goodenia in Victoria.

== Current activities ==
The club holds monthly face-to-face meetings from February to December, on the first Friday of every month. In these meetings, the club invites a guest speaker to present on a topic related to natural history or conservation. Field trips are usually held on the Sunday after a club meeting and are regularly hosted by experts in the local area, including the Friends of the Canadian Corridor.

The Field Naturalists' Club of Ballarat manages an iNaturalist project that is for recording biodiversity observations which coincides with the club's monthly field trips, as well as also participating in BioBlitzes of the Ballarat region.

The FNCB also regularly undertakes native seed collection and propagation activities, including assisting in the revitalisation of the Woowookarung Regional Park, in cooperation with the Friends of the Canadian Corridor.

The club is a member of the South East Australian Naturalists Association, and has previously hosted several of the association's twice-yearly naturalist club camps. The FNCB is also a member of the Australian Naturalists' Network.

== History ==
The FNCB was formed in 1952 but was closely linked to previous natural history organisations in the Ballarat area, most notably the Ballarat Field Club and Science Society (formed in June 1882, but ceased meetings in 1918 due to the labour shortages from the First World War). The club still holds the original meeting minutes from its predecessor. The Field Naturalists Club of Victoria has a close relationship with these predecessor clubs, undertaking several joint excursions in the 1880s, as well as assisting in running the society's Conversazione of 1885.

Allan Sonsee, lecturer at Ballarat Teachers College and television presenter "Mr Nature Man" for BTV6 and Jack Wheeler, amateur field naturalist and brother of ornithologist Wilson Roy Wheeler, were the initiators of the club. In 1952, the two organised a meeting to see if there was interest in the local community to revive a field naturalist club. The meeting was a success, and a club was formed, with Sonsee as the first president, Wheeler as the secretary, and Eric Crimmins as the treasurer. Other founding members include Mary White, head teacher at Ballarat Girls High School, and Olivia Herbert, also a teacher.

Within several years of the club's founding, members were making important observations of the flora and fauna around the Ballarat region. In 1954, Jack Wheeler, then secretary of the club, identified a population of Australian brushturkeys (Alectura lathami) near Ballarat, which were thought at the time to be extinct in Victoria.

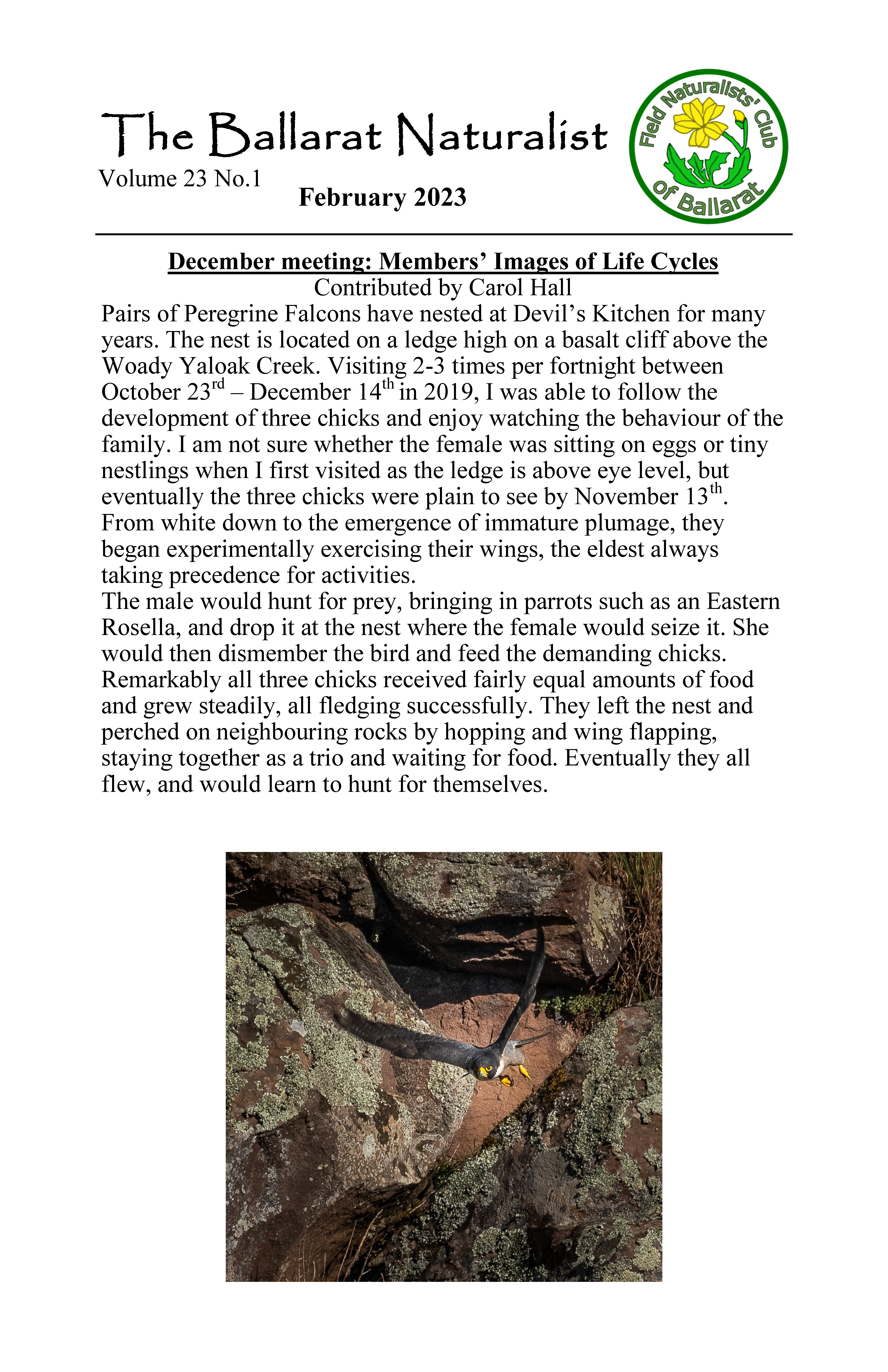
Front cover of the Ballarat Naturalist published February 2023.

Pat Joan Murphy, a significant specimen collector and contributor to the National Herbarium of Victoria, was a member of the club from 1983 until her death in 2006. 1138 of Murphy's specimens are stored in the National Herbarium of Victoria, a majority of which she collected on field trips with the club. Murphy's specimen collection includes 76 different species of orchid, many of which she observed while on field trips with her brother, founding member of the Castlemaine Field Naturalists Club and recipient of the Australian Natural History Medallion and Order of Australia Medal awardee, Ernest Perkins. Before his death in 2016, Perkins held a majority of Murphy's private collection that was not donated to the National Herbarium, including specimens of the rare Thelymitra flexuosa orchid, which Murphy had found in the Ballarat area.

Stella Bedggood, secretary for the club for 13 years in the 1960s and 1970s, lobbied the Forests Commission Victoria to reconsider their stance on logging activities within the Enfield State Forest (now the Enfield State Park) a 4,400-hectare park approximately 25 kilometres south of Ballarat. Bedggood's lobbying resulted in recommendations from the Divisional Forester to the Secretary of the Forests Commission in 1962, to preserve areas for local fauna in the forest. The Enfield grevillea (Grevillea bedggoodiana) was named after Bedggood by National Herbarium of Victoria botanist and friend of the FNCB, Jim Willis.

The club has also played a role in the establishment of the Woowookarung Regional Park, previously known as the "Canadian bush". In 1980, the club worked alongside the Friends of the Canadian Corridor to submit a letter to the Victorian Land Conservation Council, identifying the area as having high ecological importance. The two organisations worked together to fight for the establishment of the park, and have continued to work together in conserving the area of the last 60 years.

== Publications ==
The FNCB publishes a monthly field naturalist magazine, The Ballarat Naturalist from February to December. Issues include short articles, details of upcoming events, and reports of excursions, camps, meetings and presentations.

The club has published two paperback botanical guides, Discovering Ballarat’s Bushland (2002) and Wattles of Ballarat (2009).
