= Melbournopterus =

Scientific classification
- Kingdom: Animalia
- Phylum: Brachiopoda (?)
- Genus: †Melbournopterus; Caster & Kjellesvig-Waering, 1953
- Species: †M. crossotus

Binomial name
- †Melbournopterus crossotus Caster & Kjellesvig-Waering, 1953

Genus of prehistoric brachiopod

Melbournopterus is a genus of prehistoric chelicerate or brachiopod, known from the Upper Silurian of Australia. It is of uncertain taxonomic placement within the subphylum Chelicerata. Lamsdell, Percival and Poschmann (2013) argued that Melbournopterus crossotus is not a chelicerate at all, and interpreted its type specimen as the dorsal valve of a craniate brachiopod.

The only found specimen was found in 1953 by members of the Bendigo Field Naturalist Club, located in Heathcote, Bendigo. It was identified and named by Cincinnati University, who named it after the nearby state capital.

== Description ==
If Melbournopterus is a chelicerate, it is distinguished by its prosoma (head), which is bell-shaped and emarginate in front, with subrectangular compound eyes located posteriorly on the prosoma, which strongly converge anteriorly. It was small in size, and its abdomen and appendages are unknown.

== Species ==
- Melbournopterus Caster & Kjellesvig-Waering, 1953
  - M. crossotus, Caster & Kjellesvig-Waering, 1953, Upper Silurian, Australia
