= Francis George Allman Barnard =

Australian Naturalist

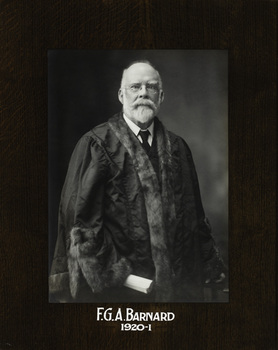
- Portrait of Francis George Allman Barnard, taken 1920
- Born: 26 December 1857; Kew, Victoria
- Died: 1 June 1932 (aged 74); Kew, Victoria
- Education: University of Melbourne
- Spouse: Mary Rachel Watts
- Father: Francis W. Barnard

Francis George Allman Barnard (1857–1932) was an Australian naturalist, a pharmacist, and Mayor of the City of Kew in Victoria. He also played one first-class cricket match for Victoria in 1886.

== Career ==
Barnard was a registered pharmacist by 1879, he then become the President of the Metropolitan Chemists' Association in 1915. He was President of the Eastern Suburbs Chemists c. 1920. The Mayor of Kew from 1920 and then the president of the Field Naturalists' Club of Victoria, and editor of their journal, The Victorian Naturalist, from 1892 to 1925.

== Works ==
- Barnard, Francis George Allman (1910). The Jubilee History of Kew, Victoria : Its Origin and Progress. E.F.G. Hodges "Mercury" Office. p. 10.
- Barnard, Francis George Allman; Lucas, Arthur Henry Shakespeare (1884). The Victorian Naturalist. Field Naturalists' Club of Victoria.

== See also ==
- List of Victoria first-class cricketers
