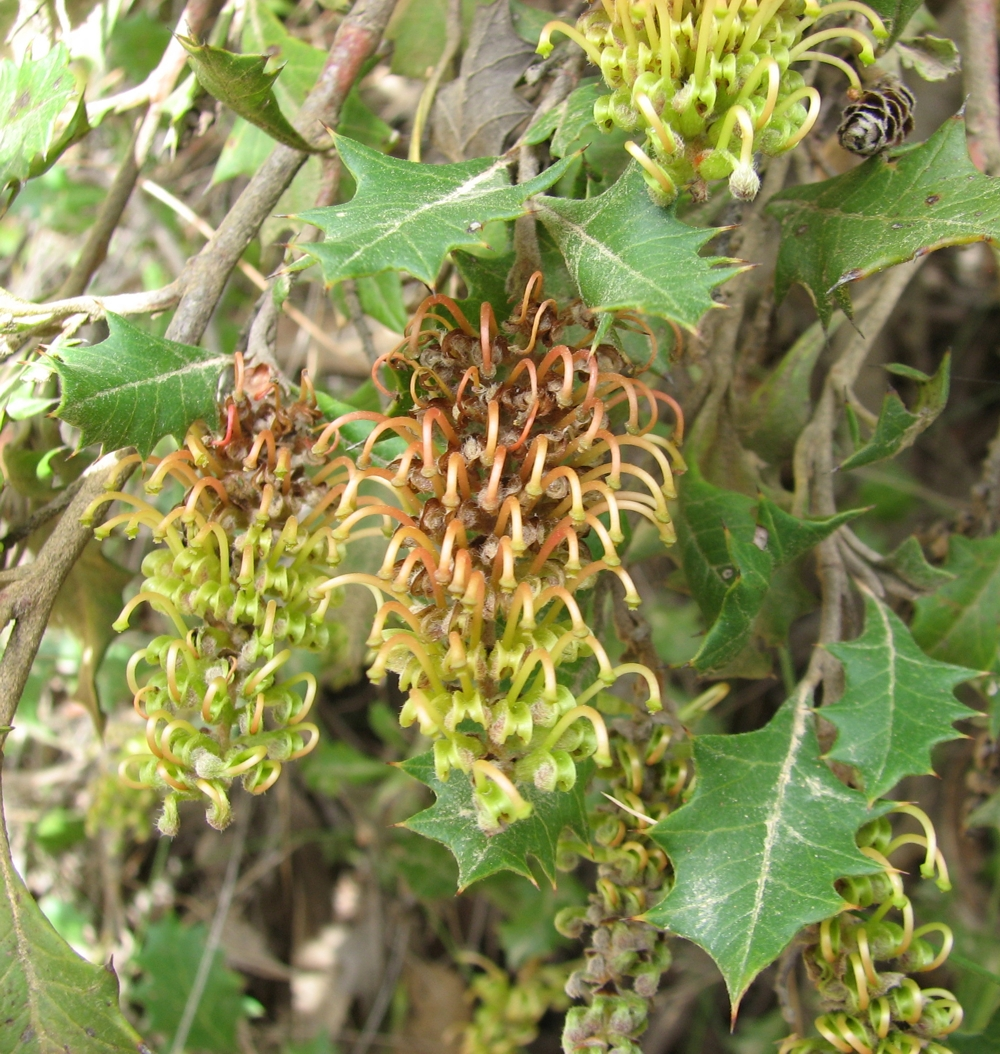
- Grevillea bedggoodiana in Enfield State Park

Conservation status
- Vulnerable (EPBC Act)

Scientific classification
- Kingdom: Plantae
- Clade: Embryophytes
- Clade: Tracheophytes
- Clade: Spermatophytes
- Clade: Angiosperms
- Clade: Eudicots
- Order: Proteales
- Family: Proteaceae
- Genus: Grevillea
- Species: G. bedggoodiana

Binomial name
- Grevillea bedggoodiana J.H.Willis ex McGill.

= Grevillea bedggoodiana =

Enfield grevillea

Species of shrub endemic to Victoria, Australia

Grevillea bedggoodiana, commonly known as Enfield grevillea, is a species of flowering plant in the family Proteaceae and is endemic to a restricted area near Ballarat in Victoria, Australia. It is a prostrate to low-lying shrub with coarsely serrated, egg-shaped to oblong leaves and green and pink flowers.

== Description ==
Grevillea bedggoodiana is a prostrate to low-lying shrub that typically grows to a height of up to 0.5 m (1 ft 8 in) with hairy branchlets. Its leaves are egg-shaped to oblong in outline, 20–70 mm (0.79–2.76 in) long and 10–35 mm (0.39–1.38 in) wide, with five to nine lobes or teeth, or sometimes pinnatifid. The flowers are arranged in more or less one-sided groups, the rachis hairy and 20–65 mm (0.79–2.56 in) long. The flowers are green at first, becoming pink, the style glabrous green, later deep pink, the pistil 12–16.5 mm (0.47–0.65 in) long. Flowering occurs from October to November and the fruit is a softly-hairy follicle 8.5–10.0 mm (0.33–0.39 in) long.

== Taxonomy ==
Grevillea bedggoodiana was first formally described in 1986 by Donald McGillivray from an unpublished description by Jim Willis, in McGillivray's book New Names in Grevillea (Proteaceae). The specific epithet commemorates Stella Bedggood (1916–1978), a member of the Ballarat Field Naturalists' Club.

== Distribution and habitat ==
Enfield grevillea occurs in eucalypt woodland between Enfield and Smythesdale near Ballarat in Victoria.

== Conservation status ==
The species is listed as vulnerable under the Australian Government Environment Protection and Biodiversity Conservation Act, as endangered in Victoria under the Flora and Fauna Guarantee Act 1988 and as vulnerable in the Department of Environment and Primary Industries Advisory List of Rare Or Threatened Plants In Victoria.
