= Bendigo Field Naturalists Club =

Victorian regional organisation

The Bendigo Field Naturalists Club (BFNC) is an Australian regional scientific natural history society, dedicated to the study, appreciation and conservation of the natural environment. It is located in Bendigo, in central Victoria, and focuses on the native biodiversity of the Bendigo Valley.

The main vision of the club is to see a "secure and healthy natural environment that sustains our biodiversity, and a community that understands and values it", and the stated purpose of their activities is to encourage education, conservation, and enjoyment of nature within the Bendigo Valley.

== Activities ==
The club holds monthly face-to-face meetings from February to December, on the second Wednesday of the month. In these meetings, the club invites a guest speaker to present on a topic related to conservation and native flora and fauna. The club also holds excursions several times a month, each with a specific interest focus, including day and night walks, conservation activities and talks from visiting experts in the area or field.

The club's conservation work includes a nest box project, that has been carried out consistently since 1986, with club members sourcing, installing and maintaining 500 nest boxes for brush-tailed phascogale. The club as received a significant response from the scientific conservation community for their work, with studies indicating that the nest box project has played a key role in preventing localized extinction of the species in the Bendigo area, including Greater Bendigo National Park and Bendigo Regional Park. In recent years the project has been undertaken in collaboration with Parks Victoria and the Department of Environment, Land, Water and Planning.

The club has also successfully lobbied against commercial timber harvesting works within native bushland. In 1971 the club lobbied for the continued protection and conservation of the Bendigo Whipstick Forest. In 2020, the BFNC submitted an official opposition to the Department of Energy, Environment and Climate Action (DEECA) regarding the continuation of the Western Victoria Regional Forest Agreement, noting it was economically unsustainable and severely impacting the native flora and fauna of the region. In response to public outcry, severe bushfires, prolonged legal action, and court decisions, DEECA marked the ending of the agreement at the end of 2024, six years earlier than the original agreement planned.

The BFNC is a primary stakeholder in the Bendigo Sustainability Group Festival, in collaboration with the Bendigo Family Nature Club, Sustainability Victoria, Department of Energy, Environment and Climate Action, and several other community and government groups.

The BFNC is a member of the South East Australian Naturalists Association, and has previously hosted several of the association's biyearly naturalist club camps. The club is also a member of the Australian Naturalists' Network.

== History ==
The first version of the club, the Field Naturalists Club of Bendigo, was formed in August 1945 by first President Marc Cohn, Senior Vice-president Hugh Milne and Junior Vice-president and Secretary Jack Ipsen and was recognised as a sister club of the Field Naturalists Club of Victoria, being the third naturalist club established in the State. The name was changed to the Bendigo Field Naturalists Club over the latter half of the 1940s, being officially recognised in the early 1950s. Zoologist and Director of the National Museum of Victoria, Charles Brazenor was a supporter of the club, hosting several talks on native fauna at club meetings during the 1950s.

The BFNC inspired the creation of the Castlemaine Field Naturalists Club, with many of the Castlemaine club's founding members coming from the BFNC. Throughout the last near half-century of both club's activities, the clubs have maintained a close relationship, sharing many activities and functions.

The BFNC, in collaboration with the Ararat Field Naturalist Club, organised and partially funded the erection of a stone seat memorial in 1950, to Grampians pioneer and explorer Daniel Sullivan (1836 to 1895), in recognition of his work identifying wildflowers in the region.

On a field trip in 1953, the club discovered the first and only known fossil of a prehistorical chelicerate or brachiopod specimen in Heathcote. The specimen was initially identified by Cincinnati University as a previously un-discovered species Silurian eurypterid, which they named Melbourneopterus, after the nearby state capital. The club attracted scientific attention after the discovery, and intensified their efforts in finding more specimens, however no others were found. 60 years after the discovery, the identity of the taxonomic placement is still uncertain.

The BFNC were instrumental in the founding and continued protection of the Bendigo Whipstick and Kamarooka State Parks, now a part of the Greater Bendigo National Park. Club members have undertaken conservation efforts in the area for 80 years, participating in native plant identification projects as early as 1940, as a part of the Field Naturalists Club of Victoria.

The club first proposed the creation of a state park in Whipstick and Kamarooka in 1957, sending a letter to the National Parks Authority to have four square miles of land set aside due to its ecological significance. Over the next twenty years the club sent three more proposals to government bodies, including submissions to Premier Henry Bolte and Minister for Lands Bill Borthwick. A final successful submission in 1974 involved club members undertaking extensive research into the flora and fauna of the area through observations, and identifying species critical to the ongoing biodiversity of the region. Both state parks were created in 1987, in response to the support of naturalist and conservation groups in the area, including the BFNC. The club has continued to act undertaken conservation, rubbish removal and seedling efforts within the area, in cooperation with other local conservation groups and the Dja Dja Wurrung people.

== Publications ==
The BFNC publishes a monthly field naturalist magazine, The Whirrakee, from February to December. Issues include information on club meetings, short articles, details of upcoming events, and reports of excursions, camps, meetings and presentations. The publication is named for the Whirrakee wattle, a species of Acacia endemic to the Bendigo Whipstick, an area the BFNC has made great efforts to conserve.

The club's first newsletter, The Bendigo Naturalist, began publication on 10 September 1945, by editor Hugh Milne. Milne continued to publish the newsletter at intervals over several years until it ceased publication. The newsletter was upgraded to a magazine in 1967, under the same title but with a higher page count, and saw consistent publication. The Whirrakee began publication in 1979, acting as both a newsletter for members and a magazine for articles on the flora and fauna of the region.

The club has also published an extensive list of native flora and fauna field guides to the Bendigo Valley, including guides for local birds, orchids, eucalypts, frogs and reptiles, spiders and wildflowers.
