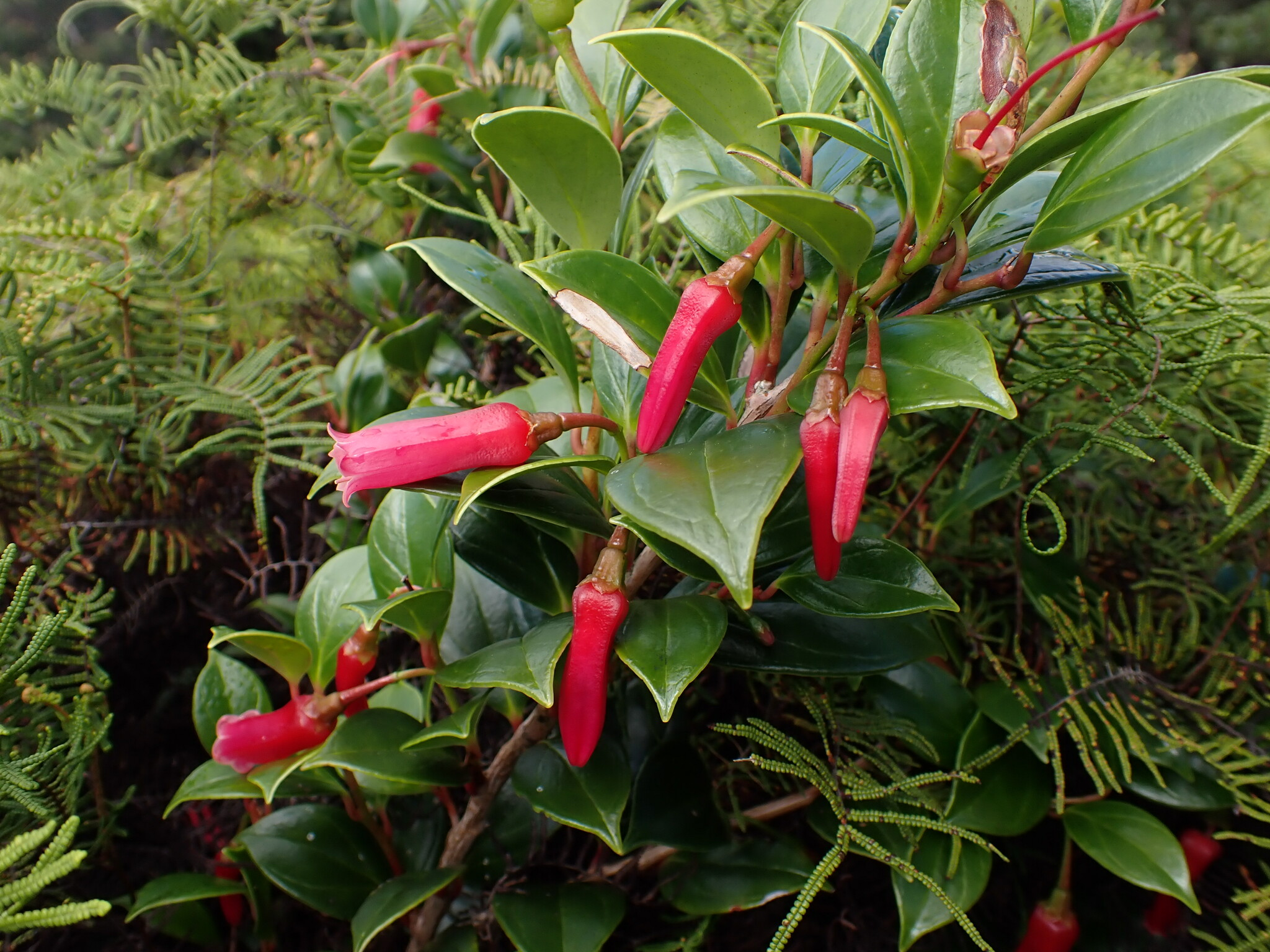

Scientific classification
- Kingdom: Plantae
- Clade: Tracheophytes
- Clade: Angiosperms
- Clade: Eudicots
- Clade: Asterids
- Order: Ericales
- Family: Ericaceae
- Genus: Paphia
- Species: P. meiniana

Binomial name
- Paphia meiniana (F.Muell.) Schltr.

Synonyms
- Agapetes meiniana F.Muell.

= Paphia meiniana =

Species of plant

Paphia meiniana is a plant in the Ericaceae family. It was first described in 1887 as Agapetes meiniana by Ferdinand von Mueller. In 1918 Rudolf Schlechter transferred it to the genus Paphia. It is endemic to north-east Queensland, growing in the wet tropics, as an epiphyte in the crowns of large trees, looking much like a vine. On rocky summits it grows as a shrub.

== Gallery ==
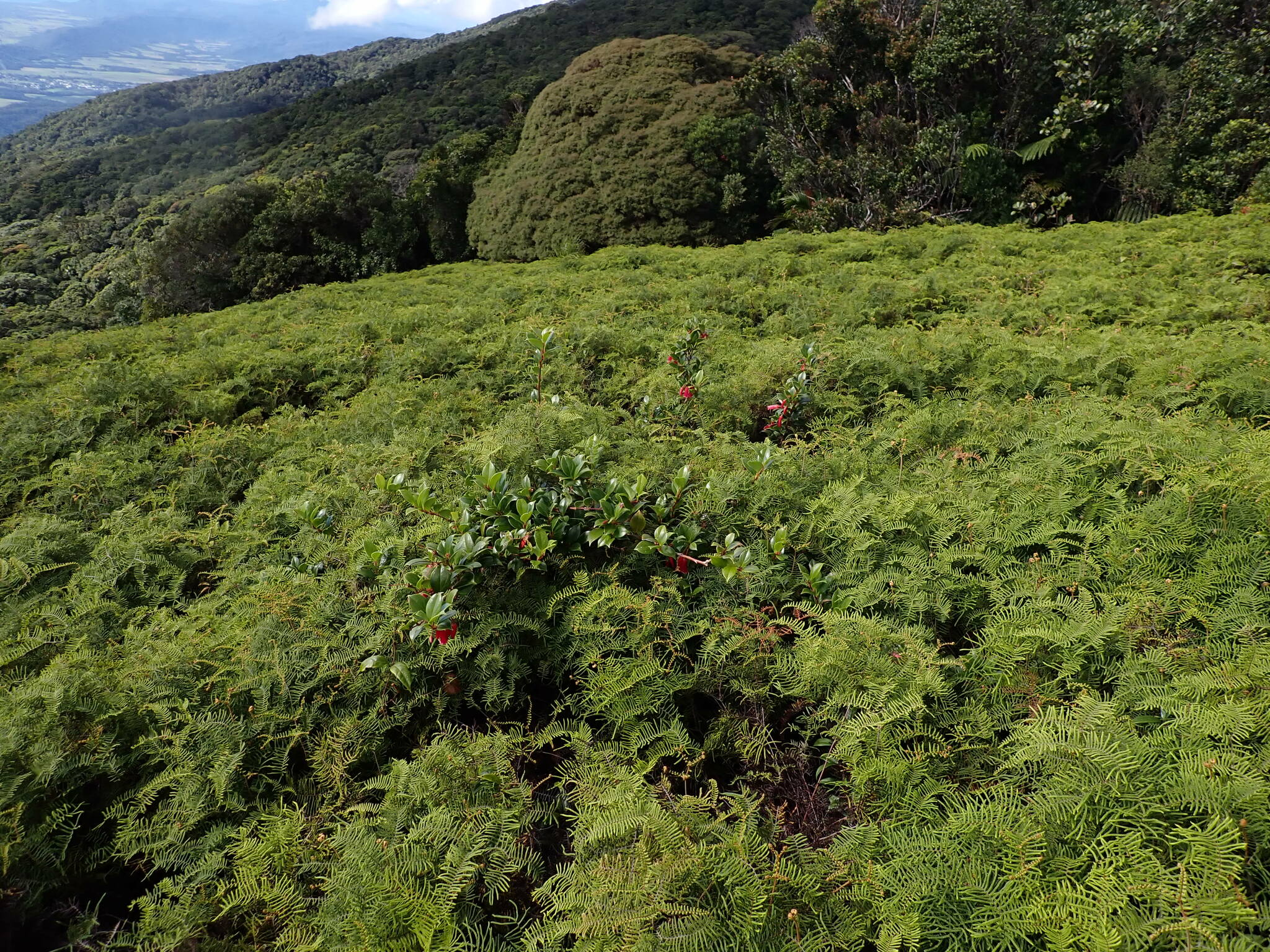

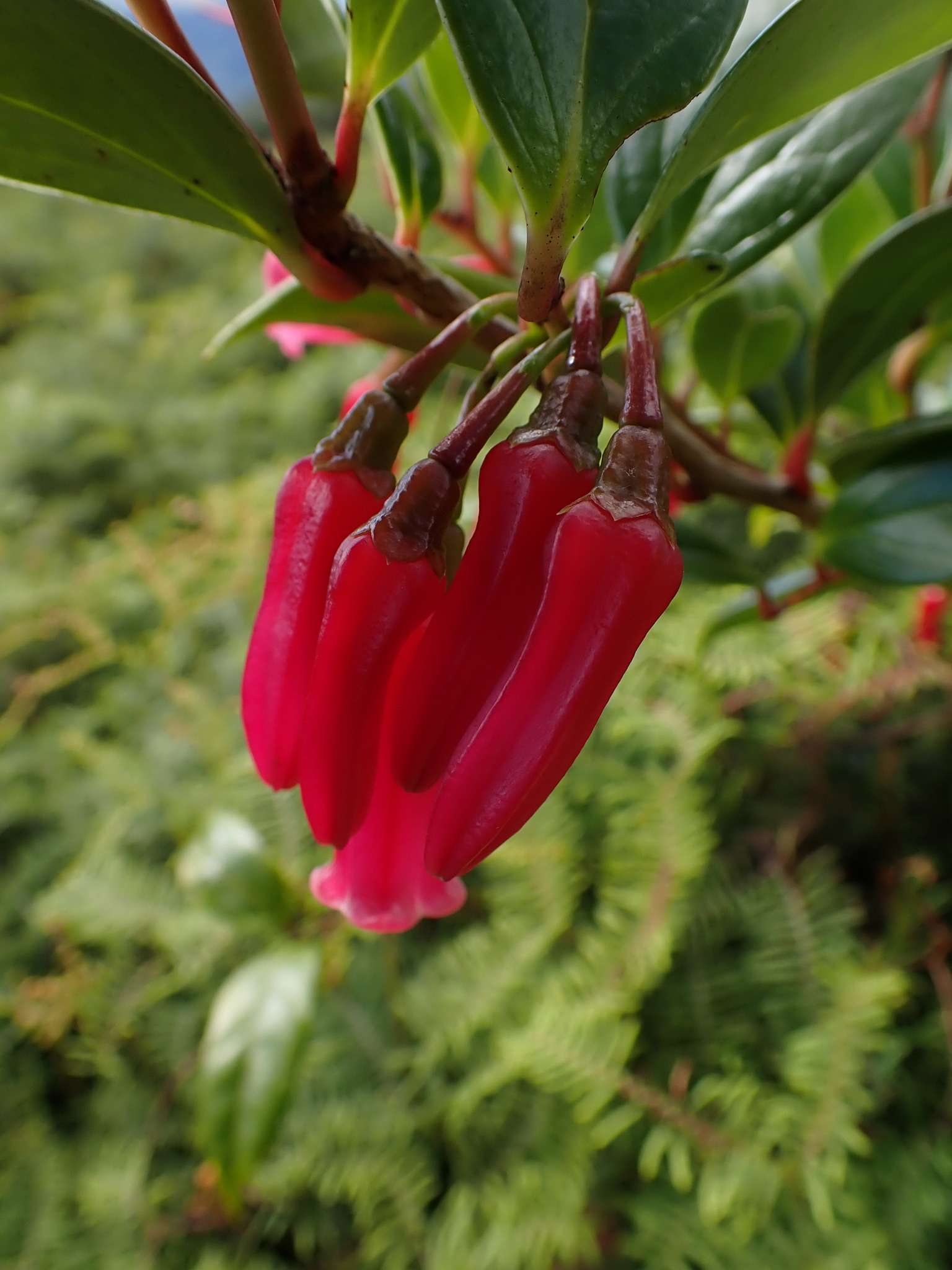

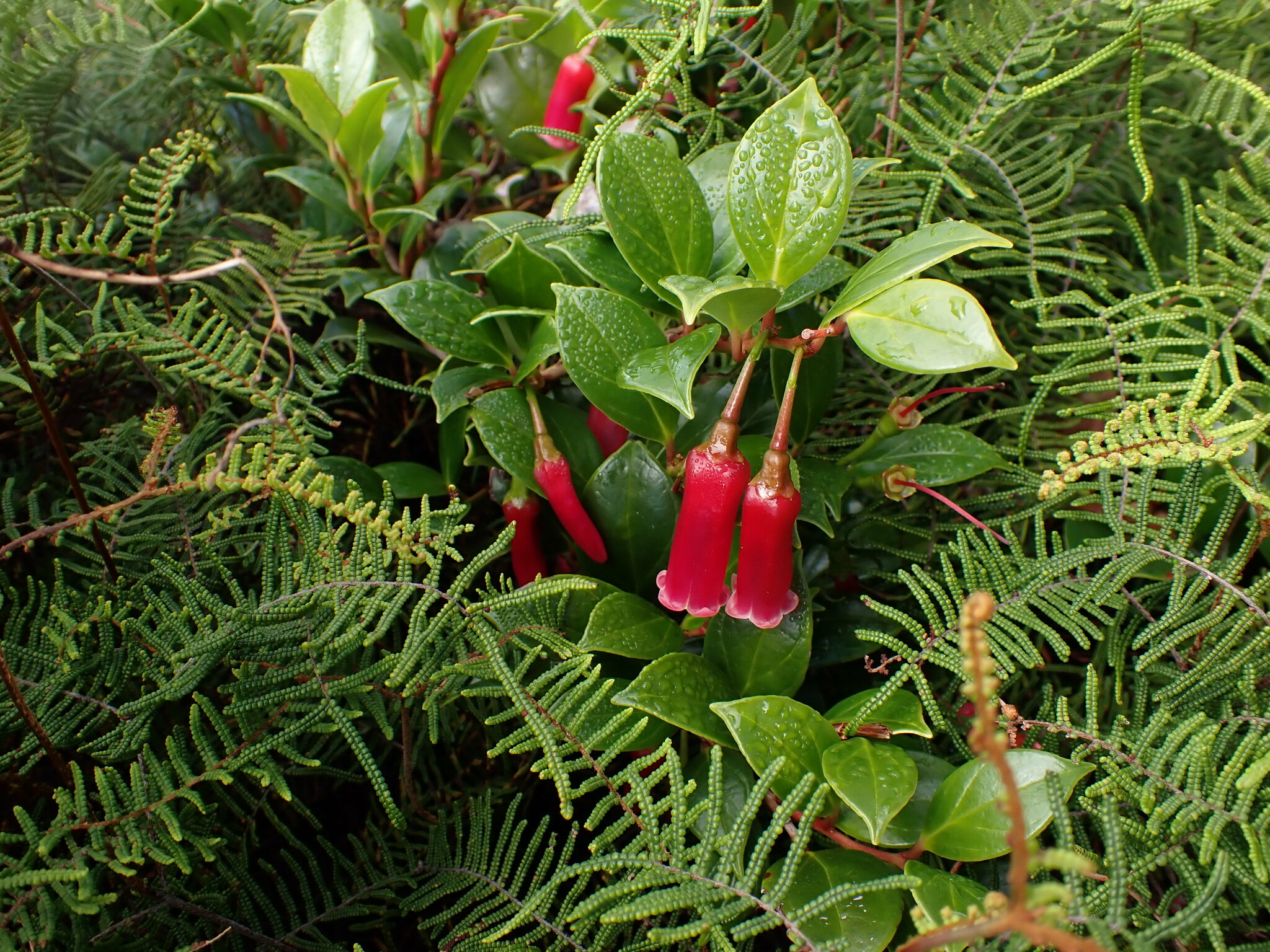
