= Dendrobium carrii =

Furrowed moon orchid

Scientific classification
- Kingdom: Plantae
- Clade: Tracheophytes
- Clade: Angiosperms
- Clade: Monocots
- Order: Asparagales
- Family: Orchidaceae
- Subfamily: Epidendroideae
- Genus: Dendrobium
- Species: D. carrii

Binomial name
- Dendrobium carrii Rupp & C.T.White

Synonyms
- Katherinea carrii (Rupp & C.T.White) Brieger; Australorchis carrii (Rupp & C.T.White) D.L.Jones & M.A.Clem.

Species of orchid

Dendrobium carrii, commonly known as the furrowed moon orchid, is an epiphytic orchid in the family Orchidaceae and has well-spaced pseudobulbs with one or two leaves, and flowering stems bearing between five and ten white or cream-coloured flowers with an orange or yellow labellum. It mostly occurs on the ranges inland from Cape Tribulation and Innisfail in Queensland.

== Description ==
Dendrobium carrii is an epiphytic herb with well-spaced pseudobulbs 20–35 mm (0.8–1 in) long and 10–15 mm (0.4–0.6 in) wide, each with one or two thin, dark green, furrowed leaves 50–100 mm (2–4 in) long, 7–10 mm (0.3–0.4 in) wide on the end. The flowering racemes are 30–80 mm (1–3 in) long and bear between five and ten resupinate white or cream-coloured flowers that are 8–10 mm (0.3–0.4 in) wide. The sepals and petals are 10–14 mm (0.4–0.6 in) long, 1.5–2 mm (0.06–0.08 in) wide with a tapered end. The labellum is orange or yellow, about 14 mm (0.6 in) long, 6 mm (0.2 in) wide and has three lobes. The side lobes are short and rounded and the middle lobe has three faint ridges along its midline. Flowering occurs from August to October.

== Taxonomy and naming ==
Dendrobium carrii was first formally described in 1937 by Herman Rupp and Cyril Tenison White and the description was published in The Queensland Naturalist. The specific epithet (carrii) refers to a Mr. Tom Carr of Julatten, who first collected it.

== Distribution and habitat ==
The furrowed moon orchid grows on the outer branches of rainforest trees that are often shrouded in mist at altitudes of between 900–1,600 m (3,000–5,000 ft) on the ranges inland from Cape Tribulation and Innisfail.
