= Charleston Conservation Park =

Protected area in South Australia

- IUCN category III (natural monument or feature)
- Location within South Australia
- Location: South Australia
- Nearest city: Lobethal
- Coordinates: 34°55′07″S 138°57′05″E
- Area: 54 ha (130 acres)
- Established: 8 April 1976
- Governing body: Department for Environment and Water

Charleston Conservation Park is a protected area located in the Australian state of South Australia in the locality of Charleston in the Adelaide Hills state government region about 32 kilometres (20 mi) east of the state capital of Adelaide and about 7 kilometres (4.3 mi) north of the town centre in Lobethal.

The conservation park consists of land in section 3943 in the cadastral unit of the Hundred of Onkaparinga. It was proclaimed under the National Parks and Wildlife Act 1972 on 8 April 1976. As of 2016, it covered an area of 54 hectares (130 acres).

In 1980, it was described as follows:

Charleston Conservation Park preserves a pristine remnant representative of the transition between the wetter stringy bark forests on the western side of the Mount Lofty Ranges and the drier mallee woodlands to the east. A large diversity of flora and fauna are represented in the park including at least seventy-six bird species. An area of gently undulating relief featuring three main woodland associations. These being, a Casuarina stricta association with scattered Eucalyptus leucoxylon / E. viminalis, a E. leucoxylon association and a Banksia marginata association. The understorey is dominated by Acacia pycnantha with occasional thickets of Leptospermum myrsinoides and Xanthorrhoea semiplana. Small, regenerating stands of Acacia melanoxylon and Callitris preissii are of interest. Charleston Conservation Park is in a near pristine condition despite its cultural surrounds, having never been grazed…

The conservation park is classified as an IUCN Category III protected area. In 1980, it was listed on the now-defunct Register of the National Estate.

== See also ==
- Protected areas of South Australia
