= Castlemaine Field Naturalists Club =

Natural history society, established 1976

The Castlemaine Field Naturalists Club (CFNC) is an Australian regional natural history society dedicated to the study, appreciation and conservation of the natural environment in the Castlemaine region of Victoria. Founded in 1976, the CFNC has played a pivotal role in promoting environmental awareness and scientific enquiry within the Castlemaine community.

The club's purpose is to "encourage and support engagement with and appreciation of all aspects of natural history in the environmentally diverse and fascinating Mount Alexander region".

CFNC is a foundation member of the South East Australian Naturalists Association and is an affiliate of the Australian Naturalists Network.

The club emblem is the nodding greenhood orchid (Pterostylis nutans).

== Current activities ==
CFNC holds monthly meetings from February to December on the second Friday of the month. Meetings usually include a guest speaker presenting on a natural history topic. Members and visitors are welcome to attend both the meetings and the club excursions, which are usually held the day after the monthly meetings. The club also organises vegetation and bird surveys, as well as weed control and roadside clean up days in the local region.

In 2001, while on an observation excursion in the region, members of the CFNC identified a vagrant population of tailed emperor butterflies (Polyura sempronius), becoming the first to report the species within the Castlemaine area, as it is rarely found outside of its native habitat of north-eastern Australia.

CFNC has previously conducted central Victorian cemetery surveys, which aimed to document the indigenous flora and provide an overall rating of the significance of the cemetery reserves. As of 2007, the club had undertaken surveys of 166 cemeteries, identifying and recording pockets of threatened and endangered native flora and fauna, including matted flax-lily (Dianella amoena), late-flower dlax-lily (Dianella tarda), arching flax-lily (Dianella sp. aff. longifolia Benambra), northern golden moths (Diuris protena), buloke mistletoe (Amyema linophylla ssp. orientale), golden cowslips (Diuris behrii) and oval-leaf pseudanthus (Pseudanthus ovalifolius).

== Community engagement ==
The CFNC is a participant in BioBlitz wildlife survey events. Each year they host the annual 4-day Great Southern BioBlitz for the Castlemaine region. In 2023, 38 observers joined the CFNC-run event on iNaturalist. Together they contributed 2474 observations across 722 species.

Four times each year, CFNC conducts roadside clean-ups as part of the Keep Australia Beautiful Adopt-a-Highway scheme. The club's adopted highway stretch is 4 km along the Pyrenees Highway from Sawmill Road on McKenzies Hill to the Castlemaine Golf Club.

For many years, CFNC has participated in controlling weeds in the Castlemaine Botanical Gardens. In the Nature Reserve, large patches of Cape Broom were removed to assist survival of the threatened Eltham copper butterfly which is found here, and the butterfly's host plant, sweet bursaria (Bursaria spinosa), was planted. The butterfly, native to Victoria and originally thought extinct in the mid-20th century, has now seen a resurgence in numbers, directly due to the efforts of field naturalist clubs, such as the CFNC. Club members have also joined other volunteers led by member Margaret Panter to remove invasive needle grass species from the lower section of the Reserve.

CFNC provides funding to the Castlemaine Secondary College for Field Naturalist Awards to encourage and reward year 11 and 12 students for their interest in environmental activities. The club also provides flora and fauna identification and advice for the local public and government bodies.

== History ==
The CFNC was founded in 1976, after local historian Raymond Bradfield called a public meeting in February of that year to garner interest. Bradfield's proposal was well supported and he was elected the club's first president. By 1977 the club had developed close working relationships with other field naturalist groups in the state, inviting Jack Wheeler, then president of the Geelong Field Naturalists Club, to their club meeting for a presentation and excursion to the Kaweka Nature Reserve in Castlemaine.

On 21 November 1985, a white box tree (Eucalyptus albens) was planted in the southern portion of Castlemaine's Kaweka Reserve, near Hall Street by Bradfield, to commemorate both the 10th anniversary of the Castlemaine Field Naturalist Club and the 25th anniversary of the Western Victoria Field Naturalists Clubs Association. In 1982, Bradfield was awarded the Medal of the Order of Australia for his services to the Castlemaine Community.

Ern Perkins, a founding member of the CFNC, was awarded an Order of Australia Medal in 2000 for his conservation and natural history work as a part of the CFNC in the Castlemaine region. In 2008, Perkins also received the Australian Natural History Medallion for his work in the research and recording of the native flora and fauna of Victoria. Perkins led many of the CNFC's conservation efforts in the region, including co-authoring Eucalypts of the Mount Alexander Region (2016) and managed the club's Photopoint Monitoring Project, personally taking photos of key conservation sites over the course of 40 years. Over his 50 years of support for the club, Perkins undertook decades-long population surveys of numerous local fauna, including studying swift parrots (Lathamus discolour) and regent honeyeaters (Xanthamyza phrygia) for the New Atlas of Australian Birds. Perkins also coordinated conservation projects for the Diggings National Heritage Park, Castlemaine Botanic Gardens and City of Castlemaine.

Perkins' sister, Pat Joan Murphy, was a key member of the Field Naturalists' Club of Ballarat and renowned contributor to the National Herbarium of Victoria, donating 1138 specimens. The two undertook field trips together and facilitated joint excursions between their respective clubs, during which many of Murphy's key specimens were found. Before his death in 2016, Perkins held much of Murphy's private collection that was not donated to the National Herbarium, including specimens of the rare Thelymitra flexuosa orchid, which Murphy had found in the Ballarat area.

== Publications ==
The CFNC publishes a monthly newsletter, the Castlemaine Naturalist, from February to December. The newsletter, which was first published in April 1976, contains natural history articles, as well as details of upcoming events and activities and is currently hosted on the CFNC website and the Biodiversity Heritage Library.

The CFNC also published and maintains an online plant identification and reference guide entitled Wild plants of the Castlemaine District, which is based on a guide produced by CFNC founding member, Ernest Perkins.

CFNC has developed many brochures on the identification of plants of the local area as well as on local sites to visit, which are distributed on the club's website and the Castlemaine Visitor Information Centre.
