= Enfield State Park =

Protected area in Victoria, Australia

- IUCN category II (national park)
- Location within Victoria
- Location: Victoria
- Nearest city: Ballarat
- Coordinates: 37°45′S 143°45′E
- Area: 44 km^{2} (17 sq mi)
- Established: 1995
- Governing body: Parks Victoria
- Website: Official website

Enfield State Park, formerly known as Enfield State Forest, is a 4,400-hectare (11,000-acre) state park near the locality of Enfield, approximately 25 kilometres (16 mi) south of Ballarat, in Victoria, Australia. The Park contains a diverse range of flora and fauna, some of which are significant, including the rare Grevillea bedggoodiana, also known as the Enfield Grevillea. There is also extensive evidence of the mining and forestry activities that were undertaken throughout the area from the late 1850s to the 1960s. It was opened in 1995.
