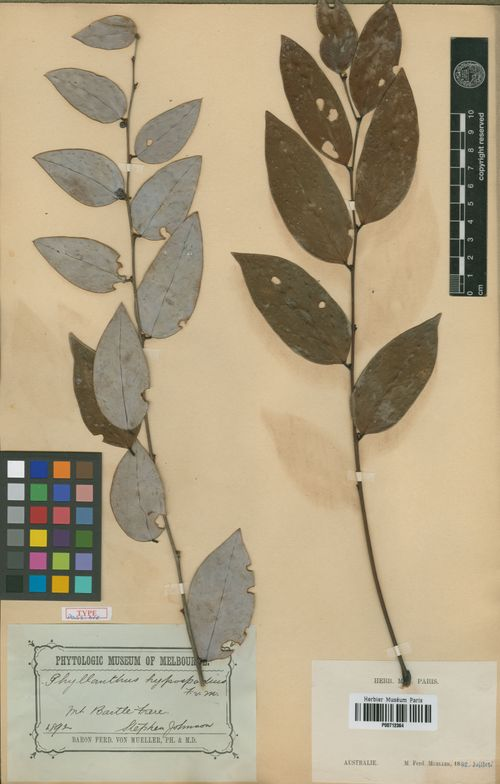
- Type specimen (MNHN P00712364) collected at Mount Bartle Frere, QLD

Conservation status
- Least Concern (NCA)

Scientific classification
- Kingdom: Plantae
- Clade: Tracheophytes
- Clade: Angiosperms
- Clade: Eudicots
- Clade: Rosids
- Order: Malpighiales
- Family: Phyllanthaceae
- Genus: Phyllanthus
- Species: P. hypospodius

Binomial name
- Phyllanthus hypospodius F.Muell.

Synonyms
- Dendrophyllanthus hypospodius (F.Muell.) R.W.Bouman

= Phyllanthus hypospodius =

Species of flowering plant

Phyllanthus hypospodius is a member of the Phyllanthaceae family, endemic to Queensland. It was first described by Ferdinand von Mueller in 1892. In 2022 R.W.Bouman and others placed it in the genus, Dendrophyllanthus, but this new combination is not yet accepted.

Mueller described the plant from a specimen collected by Stephen Johnson on the Russell River in Queensland.

Tall, throughout glabrous; petioles quite short; leaves very large, almost distichous, chartaceous, ovate- or elliptic-lanceolar, thinly venulated, on the surface dull-green, beneath whitish-grey; staminate flowers minute, on very short pedicels, each cluster accompanied by one or two pistillate flowers of larger size; outer sepals almost ovate, inner more orbicular and slightly longer; stamens six, their anthers roundish and nearly as long as their filaments; style hardly any; stigmas three, channelled or flattened, undivided, finally rigid; fruit rather large, short-pedicellate, trigonous-globular; seeds oblique-nephroid, but also somewhat triangular, smooth, outside whitish and faintly marked by a pale-brownish lineolation.

On the Russell-River; Stephen Johnson.

Shrub, attaining a height of 14 feet. Leaves to 4 inches long and 2 broad, flat, entire. Sepals pale-coloured. Anthers discon-nected. Ripe fruit measuring ⅓ inch diametrically, and quite as high as broad, many times longer than its sepals, brownish outside. Seeds nearly 1/6 inch long.

The whiteness on the lower page of the leaves as well as their form and size has our new species in common with the Sumatran P. hypoleucus, of which however the carpologic characteristics are very different.
