= The Western Australian Naturalist =

Journal of the Western Australian Naturalists Club

- Discipline: Biology
- Language: English

Publication details
- History: 1939–present

Standard abbreviations
- ISO 4: West. Aust. Nat.

Indexing
- ISSN: 0508-4865

Links
- Journal homepage

The Western Australian Naturalist (also known as the Naturalist), is the peer-reviewed scientific journal of the Western Australian Naturalists' Club. It publishes original research on topics related to the natural history of Western Australia.

It was established in 1947.

Similar publications emanated from groups that were established in other Australian states, the South Australian being a part of the Royal Society in that state and the Victorian publication was established as early as the 1880s.

The editor from 1947 to 1980 was Dom Serventy.

At times the publication and contents of the issues of the Naturalist were noted in the local newspaper The West Australian.

The history of the club was first published in the Naturalist in 1964 and subsequently expanded and published separately at a later date.

George Seddon in his work Sense of Place wrote:

there are three good local inexpensive journals that should be in every school and public library: The Journal of the Royal Society of Western Australia, the Journal and Proceedings of the Royal Western Australian Historical Society and The Western Australian Naturalist [...].

The Naturalist was the location of:

- the original description of the short necked tortoise Pseudemydura umbrina
- the details of the rediscovery of the noisy scrub bird Atrichornis clamosus
- the further description and habits of the frog Myobatrachus gouldii
- the further elaborations of the behaviours of the giant ghost bat Macroderma gigas

At various stages offprints have been made of articles on subjects that had not had publication elsewhere, or items from The Naturalist have been included in compiled volumes.
