= Western Australian Naturalists' Club =

Conservation group in Western Australia

The Western Australian Naturalists' Club, founded in Perth, Western Australia, in 1924, is one of the oldest conservation groups in Australia. It caters for those interested in all areas of natural history and conservation in Western Australia through a program of excursions, meetings, workshops and social events.

It consists of branches across the Perth metropolitan area, in the northern suburbs, southern suburbs, the Perth Hills (usually known as the Darling Range branch and the Perth city branch suburbs and the governing council. The club is also a member of the Australian Naturalists' Network.

There is also a group that focuses mainly on bushwalking. Some meetings and events are also designed to include from 6 – 17 years age group.

The club's stated purpose is "encouraging the study and protection of the natural environment" and it aims to support and engage in the study and conservation of the biodiversity of Western Australia.

== History ==
The inaugural meeting of the club was held on 3 July 1924 under the direction of three scientists: botanist W. M. Carne, entomologist J. Clark and ornithologist Dominic Serventy.

From early in its existence it held annual exhibitions, which became known as the Wild Life Shows, in the Perth Town Hall.

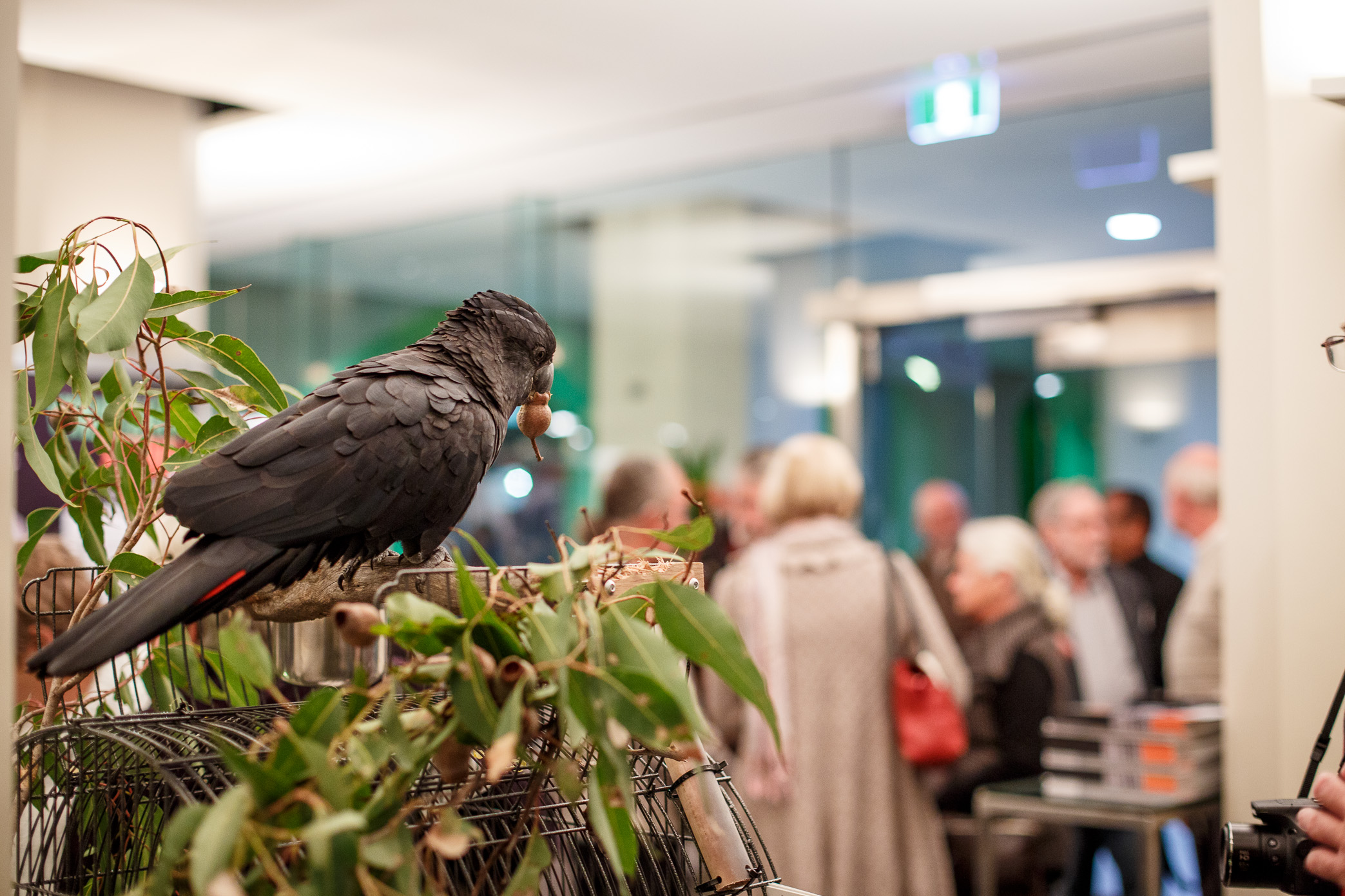
Black cockatoo surveys the crowd at a Wild Life Show held to commemorate 50 years since the last show

It adopted a constitution in 1936, revised when the club became incorporated in 1979. Its journal, The Western Australian Naturalist, was first published in 1947. The club was incorporated in 1953. Most regular meetings were held at the Western Australian Museum until 1962 when the club obtained its own premises in Nedlands, a hall that was replaced in 1997 by a library and office in Northbridge, with monthly meetings held at the University of Western Australia. The club also owns a field station at Culeenup Island near Yunderup, 100 kilometres (62 mi) south of Perth where the Murray River enters the Peel Inlet.

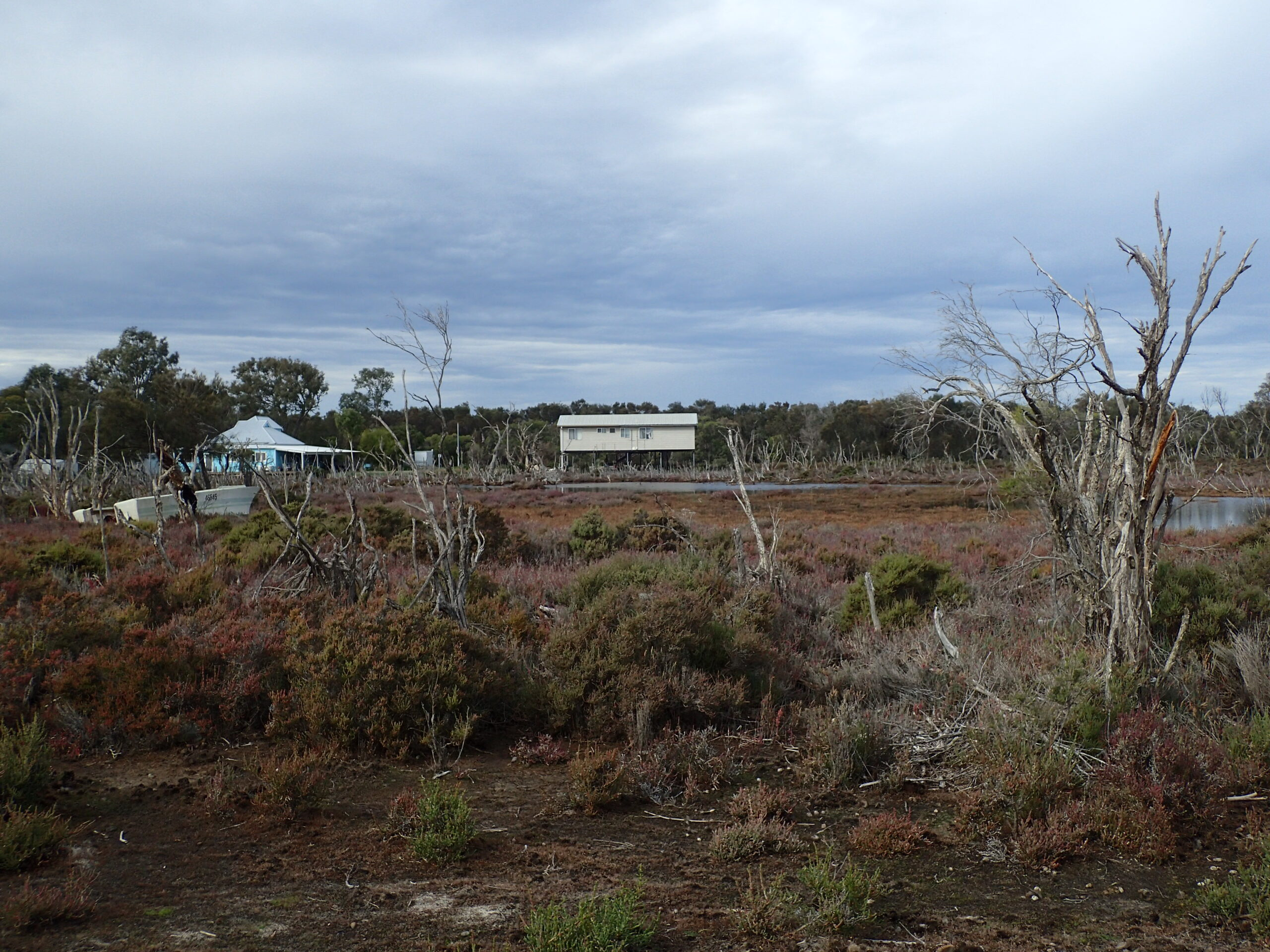
The field station on Culeenup Island

== Activities ==
=== Serventy Memorial Lecture ===
Each year the club holds its Serventy Memorial Lecture, to honour the family of Dominic Serventy, whose members are all recognised as having contributed greatly to the original success of the organisation. The lecture, generally featuring a well known local speaker, raises funds for the Serventy Memorial Prize which is awarded annually to a student in biological sciences at each of the four main universities in Perth. These students are subsequently invited to present a short talk at the club's main meeting about their area of greatest interest in natural history and perhaps publish a paper in its scientific journal.

=== Meetings ===
A monthly meeting is held at each branch of the club, which may consist of an invited expert presenter, members' observations, a nature table, a short focus talk or other items as determined by the branch's organising committee. The topics covered by presenters may range from mycology and botany to marine life, herpetology, ornithology, entomology, paleontology or earth sciences.

=== Excursions ===
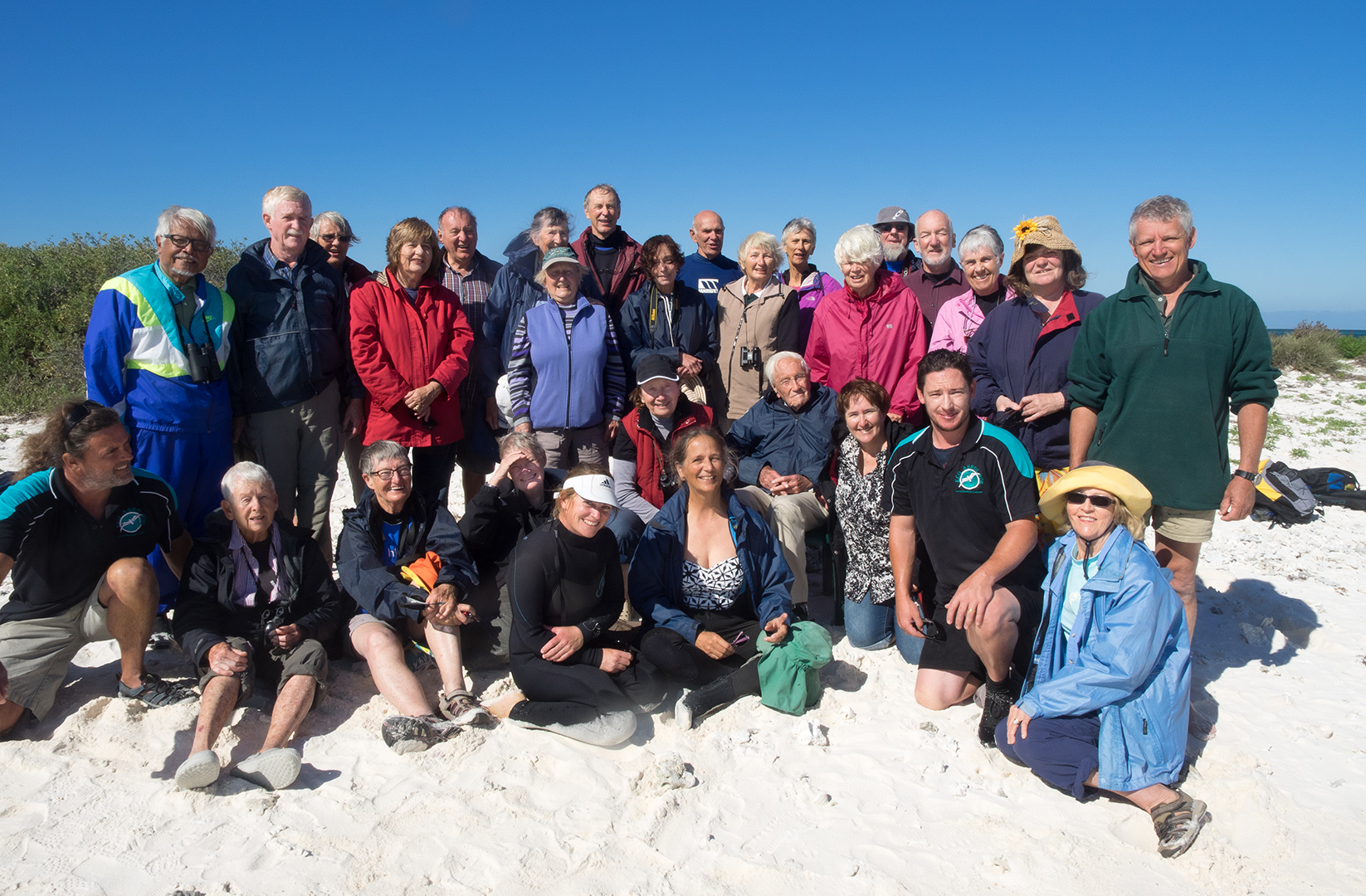
Club members and visitors at the Abrolhos Islands in 2016

Each branch organises an excursion suited to what is happening in the environment at the time. In general, branches aim to have monthly excursions in their geographical area. However, day trips to nearby points of interest are common, as are weekend excursions. Once a year the club organises a long-range excursion to an area of Western Australia that is of special natural history significance, such as the Abrolhos Islands or the Helena and Aurora Range.

== Publications ==
Members receive a refereed scientific journal, The Western Australian Naturalist, twice a year, as well as monthly newsletters. The club has also published a series of natural history handbooks.

== See also ==
- List of Australian field naturalist clubs

== General references ==
- Erickson, Rica; Western Australian Naturalists' Club (1974). History of the Western Australian Naturalists' Club (1924-1974) (Revised ed.). Western Australian Naturalists' Club. ISBN 978-0-9598452-0-4.

== Sources ==
- Creed, Kate (2 June 2022). "History". Western Australian Naturalists' Club. Archived from the original on 15 March 2022.
- "14ft Grass for Exhibition". Daily News (1st ed.). Perth. 7 September 1946. p. 7 (printed as 6). Archived from the original on 23 November 2022 – via National Library of Australia.
