= Pauline Neura Reilly =

Australian ornithologist and author

Pauline Neura Reilly OAM FRAOU
- Born: Pauline Neura Duncan; 5 December 1918; Adelaide
- Died: 2 April 2011 (aged 92); Melbourne
- Occupations: An Australian ornithologist and author of children's books.
- Honours: Medal of the Order of Australia (OAM) for service to ornithology (1994), Fellow of the Royal Australasian Ornithologists Union (1981)

Pauline Neura Reilly OAM FRAOU (5 December 1918 – 22 April 2011) was an Australian ornithologist and author of children's books.

== Biography ==
Reilly was born (as Pauline Duncan) in Adelaide. Her family moved to Melbourne where she attended Korowa Anglican Girls' School and Melbourne Girls Grammar School until 1934. Before the Second World War she worked as a secretary, then served from 1942 to 1944 as a gunner in the Women's Auxiliary Australian Air Force, as well as working for Australian Army Intelligence. She married Arthur Reilly in 1943.

Reilly joined the Royal Australasian Ornithologists Union (RAOU) in 1956, which she served as Publicity Officer 1966–1967, on the Field Investigations Committee 1969–1972, as President 1972–1975, and as the Chair of the Atlas Committee 1976–1982. From 1969 to 1970 she was President of the Bird Banders' Association of Australia. From 1964 to 1981 she was the Honorary Regional Victorian Organiser of the Australian Bird and Bat Banding Scheme. One of her main achievements with the RAOU was the instigation, leadership and successful conclusion of the RAOU's first Atlas of Australian Birds project, fieldwork for which ran from 1 January 1977 to 31 December 1981.

Reilly was actively involved in ornithological fieldwork for many years, especially in studies of little penguins. In 1968 she founded the Penguin Study Group of the Victorian Ornithological Research Group. In 1973 she led an expedition to the Great Australian Bight to carry out penguin research. In 1978–79 she became the first woman to spend the summer research season on subantarctic Macquarie Island to band penguins. She was invited to open the Second International Penguin Conference in August 1992.

In later years Reilly moved to Aireys Inlet on the Victorian coast where she concentrated on writing a series of scientifically accurate children's books about Australian birds and other animals, mainly illustrated first by Will Rolland and later by Kaylene Traynor.

Reilly died on 22 April 2011, aged 92.

== Honours ==
- 1981 – elected a Fellow of the RAOU
- 1987 and 1992 – received Whitley Book Awards for Best Children's Series from the Royal Zoological Society of New South Wales
- 1994 – awarded the Medal of the Order of Australia (OAM) for service to ornithology
- 1994 – awarded the Wilderness Society Award for Children's Literature (non-fiction)
- 2001 – awarded the RAOU's John Hobbs Medal for contributions to amateur ornithology in Australia
- 2005 – awarded the W. Roy Wheeler Medallion for contributions to field ornithology by Bird Observation & Conservation Australia
- 2005 – awarded the Australian Natural History Medallion

== Published works ==
- Reilly, Pauline N. (1983). Fairy Penguins and Earthy People. Lothian Publishing Co: Melbourne, Australia. ISBN 0-85091-160-5
- Blakers, Margaret; Davies, S.J.J.F.; & Reilly, Pauline N. (1984). The Atlas of Australian Birds. Melbourne University Press: Carlton, Australia. ISBN 0-522-84285-2
- Reilly, Pauline N. (1988). The Lyrebird. A natural history. Australian Natural History Series. NSW University Press: Kensington, Australia. ISBN 0-86840-083-1
- Reilly, Pauline N. (1988). Private Lives. Ages, mates and movements of some Australian birds. Kangaroo Press: Kenthurst, Australia. ISBN 0-86417-149-8
- Reilly, Pauline N. (1994). Penguins of the World. Oxford University Press: South Melbourne, Australia. ISBN 0-19-553547-2
- Dann, Peter; Norman, Ian; & Reilly, Pauline. (Eds). (1995). The Penguins: Ecology and Management. Surrey Beatty & Sons: Chipping Norton, Australia. ISBN 0-949324-58-2
- Reilly, Pauline. (2001). Cannabis and Cancer: Arthur's Story. Scribe Publications: Australia. ISBN 0-908011-61-X

=== Children's books ===
- Reilly, Pauline. (1988). The Emu That Walks Towards the Rain. Kangaroo Press.ISBN 0-86417-059-9
- Reilly, Pauline. (1988). The Kookaburra That Helps at the Nest. Kangaroo Press.ISBN 0-86417-119-6
- Reilly, Pauline. (1988). The Lyrebird That is Always Too Busy to Dance. Kangaroo Press. ISBN 0-86417-086-6
- Reilly, Pauline. (1989). Australian Birds – True Life Stories. Kangaroo Press. ISBN 0-86417-269-9
- Reilly, Pauline. (1990) The Echidna. Kangaroo Press ISBN 0-86417-2850
- Reilly, Pauline. (1991). Platypus. Kangaroo Press. ISBN 0-86417-391-1
- Reilly, Pauline. (1993). Frillneck: An Australian Dragon. Kangaroo Press. ISBN 0-86417-414-4
- Reilly, Pauline. (1993). Kangaroo. Kangaroo Press. ISBN 0-86417-538-8
- Reilly, Pauline. (1993). The Tasmanian Devil. Kangaroo Press. ISBN 0-86417-207-9
- Reilly, Pauline. (1993). The Wombat. Kangaroo Press. ISBN 0-86417-148-X
- Reilly, Pauline. (1994). Sugar Glider. Kangaroo Press. ISBN 0-86417-590-6
- Reilly, Pauline. (1995). The Penguin That Walks at Night. Kangaroo Press. ISBN 0-86417-034-3
- Reilly, Pauline. (1995). The Galah. Kangaroo Press. ISBN 0-86417-346-6
- Reilly, Pauline. (1995). Kiwi. Kangaroo Press. ISBN 0-86417-488-8
- Reilly, Pauline. (1995). The Koala. Kangaroo Press. ISBN 0-86417-243-5
- Reilly, Pauline. (1995). Malleefowl: The Incubator Bird. Kangaroo Press. ISBN 0-86417-317-2
- Reilly, Pauline. (1995). Python. Kangaroo Press. ISBN 0-86417-698-8
- Reilly, Pauline. (1996). Bilby. Kangaroo Press. ISBN 0-86417-737-2
- Reilly, Pauline. (1996). Brolga. Kangaroo Press. ISBN 0-86417-719-4
- Reilly, Pauline. (1996). Penguin. Kangaroo Press. ISBN 0-86417-826-3)
- Reilly, Pauline. (1996). Pobblebonk the Frog. Kangaroo Press. ISBN 0-86417-802-6
- Reilly, Pauline. (1997). Echidna. Kangaroo Press. ISBN 978-0-86417-285-3
- Reilly, Pauline. (1997). Kangaroo. Kangaroo Press. ISBN 0-86417-538-8
- Reilly, Pauline. (1997). Pelican. Kangaroo Press. ISBN 0-86417-830-1
- Reilly, Pauline. (1998). Boobook the Owl. Kangaroo Press. ISBN 0-86417-966-9
- Reilly, Pauline. (1998). Emperor the Magnificent Penguin. Bristlebird Books. ISBN 0-86417-907-3
- Reilly, Pauline. (2000). Arcto the Seal. Bristlebird Books. ISBN 0-9577789-1-0
- Reilly, Pauline. (2000). Hippocampus the Seahorse. Bristlebird Books. ISBN 0-9577789-0-2
- Reilly, Pauline. (2001). Aquila the Eagle. Bristlebird Books. ISBN 0-9577789-2-9
- Reilly, Pauline. (2003). Ornithorhynchus the Platypus. Bristlebird Books. ISBN 0-9577789-8-8 (2nd revised ed. of Platypus (1991))
- Reilly, Pauline. (2005). Crocodylus the Freshwater Crocodile. Bristlebird Books. ISBN 0-9751271-1-X
- Reilly, Pauline. (2008). Varanus the Gardening Goanna. Bristlebird Books. ISBN 0-9751271-6-0

== See also ==
- List of ornithologists
