= The Australian Bird Guide =

Australian guide book on birds

- Authors: Peter Menkhorst, Danny Rogers, Rohan Clarke
- Illustrators: Jeff Davies, Peter Marsack, Kim Franklin
- Language: English
- Subject: Australian Birds
- Genre: Nature Guide
- Published: 2017
- Publisher: CSIRO Publishing
- Publication place: Australia
- Pages: 576
- ISBN: 978-0-643-09754-4

The Australian Bird Guide (The Guide) was published by CSIRO Publishing in 2017. Written by Peter Menkhorst along with Danny Rogers and Rohan Clarke and illustrations by Jeff Davies, Peter Marsack and Kim Franklin, the book took almost eight years to produce. It includes 936 birds including 160 vagrants and information on the evolution and classification of birds. Upon its release, the book was praised for its comprehensiveness, images, and text detail, however, the index and measurements were criticised. A compact version of the guide was also released in 2022.

== Description ==
The foreword to The Australian Bird Guide was written by Paul Sullivan, Chief Executive of Birdlife Australia, Australia's peak ornithological body. This foreword states that the authors and artists of this book are considered leaders in their field and that the details of species and sub-species is a first for Australian birds. It also describes how the maps are derived from data collected by thousands of people over many decades to give some of the best distribution maps seen in Australian Guides.

The Guide starts with a two-page visual reference guide giving the page where each bird can be found and is then followed by an alphabetical quick reference guide. Both are useful in assisting in locating the required page for bird identification. In addition, there is an extensive index at the back of the book.

This is then followed by details on how the guide was constructed by the lead author Peter Menkhorst, co-authors Danny Rogers and Rohan Clarke and illustrators Jeff Davis, Peter Marsack and Kim Franklin, outlining their sources of information and specifically what area and species were covered. This is followed by sections on identifying birds and on birding in Australia.

Before the detailed description of species commences, there is a guide for birders to the evolution and classification of birds. While this may not be expected in such a work, this section “will get birders thinking”. This section was written by Dr Leo Joseph of the Australian National Wildlife Collection, CSIRO (Commonwealth Scientific Industrial Research Organisation).

The Guide covers a total of 936 species that comprise 747 breeding residents or regular migrants, 29 introduced species and 160 vagrants. The book uses the IOC version 5.4 for species level taxonomy. These birds are grouped as marine and coastal birds, freshwater birds and terrestrial birds and then taxonomically. It also provides detailed maps indicating where a species or sub-species are likely to occur and shading to help identify where the birds are most likely to occur. Several of the reviewers highlighted this feature as a major positive of the guide and the 10,000 Bird review considered the two field guides with this feature the best available.

In 2019 the revised edition was published. This edition has updated maps, artwork and species accounts.

== Reception ==
Reviewing for The Sydney Morning Herald, Sean Dooley praised the book's comprehensiveness, detail, visuals, "aesthetically pleasing yet extremely accurate" images, and writing. This sentiment was shared by reviewers from Australian Field Ornithology, which also complimented the book's "life-like" illustrations, detailed text, and "scientifically accurate" maps. Alan Pearson from the British Bird Guides also was positive towards the "clear" text and maps.

However, elements of the book were met with criticism. Dooley criticised the occasional jargon, the index, and the small size of the distribution maps which was "to the point of illegibility", however, he concluded that the book, despite the "minor quibbles", was an "outstanding achievement". Australian Filed Ornithology also criticised the measurements of wing lengths and bill lengths as "unconventional", the illustrative and typographical errors, and the index as a "disservice". Pearson was additionally critical that the full length (size range) of the birds was not provided rather it provides wing size, bill length and weight.

Donna Lynn Schulman reviewed this Guide for 10,000 Birds and compared this guide to the most popular existing Australian bird guides, including Field Guide To The Birds Of Australia, 7th edition by Nicholas Day and Ken Simpson,The Slater Field Guide to Australian Birds, Field Guide To Australian Birds by Michael Morcombe, and The Field Guide to the Birds of Australia, 9th edition by Graham Pizzey and Frank Knight. Schulman stated that The Australian Bird Guide edged out The Field Guide to the Birds of Australia due to the “currency of information, denseness of text, and quality and quantity of illustrations". However, Schulman described the index as inferior.

The compact version was also reviewed by Australian Field Ornithology. The reviewers praised the book's "convenient" size, "life-like" illustrations, and decent paper quality, despite criticising the card cover as "thin" and easily damaged. Criticism was directed towards incorrect abbreviations, factual errors, and illustrative inconsistencies. Nevertheless, the review "highly recommended" the book as "a valuable, proper and convenient" guide.

== Awards ==
- Winner 2017 Whitley Award from the Royal Zoological Society of NSW
- Winner of the 2018 Australian Book Industry Award, Small Publisher's Adult Book of the year.

== The Compact Australian Bird Guide ==
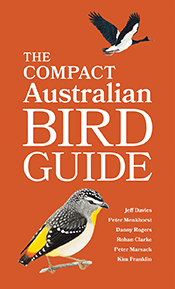

The Compact Australian Bird Guide was published in 2022 under the direction of Jeff Davies. This guide is a distillation of the information provided in the Australian Bird Guide. The aim was to provide a “concise and portable book" for field use. The compact guide uses the IOC version 11.1 for species level taxonomy. The compact guide is 252 pages versus the Australian Bird Guide at 566 pages. Its dimensions of 125mm × 203mm × 15mm is significantly smaller than the ABG at 175mm × 250mm × 33mm and its weight is only 400g. The review by Firth and valentine concluded "Quibbles and opinions aside, this book succeeds splendidly as a compact aid to bird identification".
