= Albert Orr =

Australian entomologist

Albert George Orr is an Australian entomologist.

== Biography ==
Albert Orr was born in 1953 in Maleny, Queensland. He studied mathematics and entomology at Queensland University and graduated in 1974. He received a PhD from Griffith University in 1988 for work on mating in butterflies. From 1990 worked for 10 years at Universiti Brunei Darussalam, and from 2000, he has been an honorary research fellow at Griffith University.

== Publications and awards ==
In 2003, he published A Guide to the Dragonflies of Borneo, for which he received the Worldwide Dragonfly Association’s 2005 award for outstanding achievements and contributions to the science of odonatology. This book was the first comprehensive guide to the dragonflies of the region.

He and co-author Vincent J. Kalkman were awarded the 2013 Whitley Medal by the Royal Zoological Society of New South Wales for Field Guide to the damselflies of New Guinea. In 2011 he was awarded a Whitley Certificate of Commendation for The Butterflies of Australia. The Butterflies of Australia received a favourable review i Austral Ecology for being accessible to a less specialist audience, but still providing a large amount of quality scientific insights, and thereby being an excellent complement to Michael Braby's encyclopaedic and definitive Butterflies of Australia. Complete Field Guide to Dragonflies of Australia (second edition), illustrated by Orr, was called an ”invaluable resource” in the Royal Entomological Society’s Review.

He has published four more guides to dragonflies and damselflies of Asia, as the sole author in collaboration with other entomologists. He has been the editor of The Australian Entomologist.

== Bibliography (books) ==
- A guide to the dragonflies of Borneo – Their identification and biology (2003)
- Dragonflies of Peninsular Malaysia and Singapore (2005)
- The Metalwing Demoiselles of the Eastern Tropics – Their Identification and Biology (with Matti Hämäläinen 2007)
- The Butterflies of Australia (with Roger L. Kitching, 2010)
- Field Guide to the damselflies of New Guinea (with Vincent J. Kalkman 2013)
- Field Guide to the dragonflies of New Guinea (with Vincent J. Kalkman 2015)
- A field guide to the common Dragonflies and Damselflies of Bhutan (with Thinley Gyeltshen and Vincent J. Kalkman, 2017)
- Complete Field Guide to Dragonflies of Australia (with Günther Theischinger and John Hawking, 2021)
