= Wilson Roy Wheeler =

Australian postman (1905–1988)

Wilson Roy Wheeler MBE FRAOU (1905–1988), commonly referred to as W. Roy Wheeler, was an Australian postman and professional ornithologist. He was an active bird bander and was convener of the Altona Survey Group, later part of the Victorian Ornithological Research Group. In 1965 he was awarded the Australian Natural History Medallion. He was a member of the Royal Australasian Ornithologists Union (RAOU), President 1964–1965, and made a Fellow of the RAOU in 1971.

He was also very active in the Bird Observers Club (BOCA), serving as President (1951–1954), Honorary Secretary (1954–1971) and Honorary Treasurer (1963–1971). In 2005 he was commemorated, on the occasion of BOCA's centenary, by the creation of a new award, the W. Roy Wheeler Medallion for Excellence in Field Ornithology.

In 1979, he set the record for an Australian big year, with 545 species seen, breaking the record previously held by John McKean (535 species). Wheeler's record has since been bettered, in 1982 by Kevin Bartram (607 species), in 1989 by Mike Entwhistle (633 species), and then in 2002 by Sean Dooley, the current record holder (703 species).

== Honours ==
- 1969 — awarded Member of the British Empire (MBE) for services to nature study and conservation in Victoria
- 1970 — elected a Fellow of the Royal Australasian Ornithologists Union

== Publications ==
- W. Roy Wheeler (1967). A Handlist of the Birds of Victoria. Victorian Ornithological Research Group. pp. 88pp.
- W. Roy Wheeler (1972). Birds of the Dandenongs. Field Naturalists Club of Victoria. pp. 52pp.
- W. Roy Wheeler (1974). Birds of New South Wales and Where to Find Them.
- W. Roy Wheeler (1979). The Birds of Victoria and Where to Find Them. illustrated by Jeremy Boot. Nelson. pp. 173pp. ISBN 9780170053228.
- W. Roy Wheeler (1981). The Birds of Phillip Island. Western Port Bird Observers Club. pp. 56pp. ISBN 0959347801.
