= Whitley Awards =

Whitley Awards may refer to:

- Whitley Awards (Australia)
- Whitley Awards (UK)

== See also ==
- Whitney Awards
