= Bob Green (naturalist) =

Australian naturalist and museum curator

Robert Geoffrey Hewett Green AM (4 November 1925 – 29 August 2013) was an Australian naturalist, photographer, conservationist, and long-term Curator of the Queen Victoria Museum and Art Gallery in Launceston, Tasmania.

== Early years ==
Green was born in Launceston. He grew up on the family farm at Antill Ponds in the Tasmanian Midlands where he developed a strong interest in natural history. He joined the Royal Australasian Ornithologists Union in 1946, took up bird banding and became the Tasmanian Regional Organiser of the Australian Bird and Bat Banding Scheme.

== Queen Victoria Museum ==
In 1959 Green was appointed the honorary ornithologist at the Queen Victoria Museum, the start of a thirty-year association with the institution. In 1960 he sold the farm and joined the museum staff, becoming the permanent curator from 1962 to 1990. As well as building up the museum's collections of natural history and historical material, he also amassed a large personal collection of the eggs of Tasmanian birds, which was eventually donated to the National Museum of Australia in Canberra in 2002.

== Achievements ==
Green published over 130 scientific papers covering a broad range of Tasmanian natural history, as well as popular guides to Tasmanian birds and mammals. He has been recognised in the scientific names of several animals, including a parasitic fly, a bird louse, three fleas, a mite, two fish, a skink (Carinascincus greeni), and a subspecies of the Tasmanian endemic Scrubtit (Acanthornis magnus greenianus).

== Honours ==
- 1987 – conferred Doctor of Science honoris causa by the University of Tasmania in recognition of a lifetime of achievement in zoology
- 1990 – appointed Member of the Order of Australia In recognition of service to conservation and the environment
- 2005 – awarded W. Roy Wheeler Medallion by Bird Observation & Conservation Australia for excellence in field ornithology
