= W. Roy Wheeler Medallion =

The W. Roy Wheeler Medallion for excellence in field ornithology was created on the occasion of the centenary of the founding of Bird Observation & Conservation Australia (BOCA) to commemorate Roy Wheeler MBE, FRAOU, (1905-1988), an amateur ornithologist with a long association with the Club, as well as with the Royal Australasian Ornithologists Union. The purpose of the award is to honour worthy individuals who have been outstanding contributors, innovators and leaders in field ornithology in Australia and its territories. Medals may be awarded posthumously and the award does not distinguish between amateur and professional ornithologists. Ten people were recognised at the inaugural awards made on 12 August 2005. Medallion recipients were:

- 2005 - Nigel Peter Brothers
- 2005 - Dr Leslie Christidis
- 2005 - Dr Robert Geoffrey Hewett Green AM
- 2005 - Laurence Nathan Levy
- 2005 - Dr Graham Martin Pizzey AM
- 2005 - Pauline Neura Reilly OAM, FRAOU
- 2005 - Len Robinson
- 2005 - Ian Cecil Robert Rowley CFAOU, FRAOU
- 2005 - Dr Eleanor M. Rowley
- 2005 - Professor Patricia Vickers-Rich

== See also ==
- List of ornithology awards
