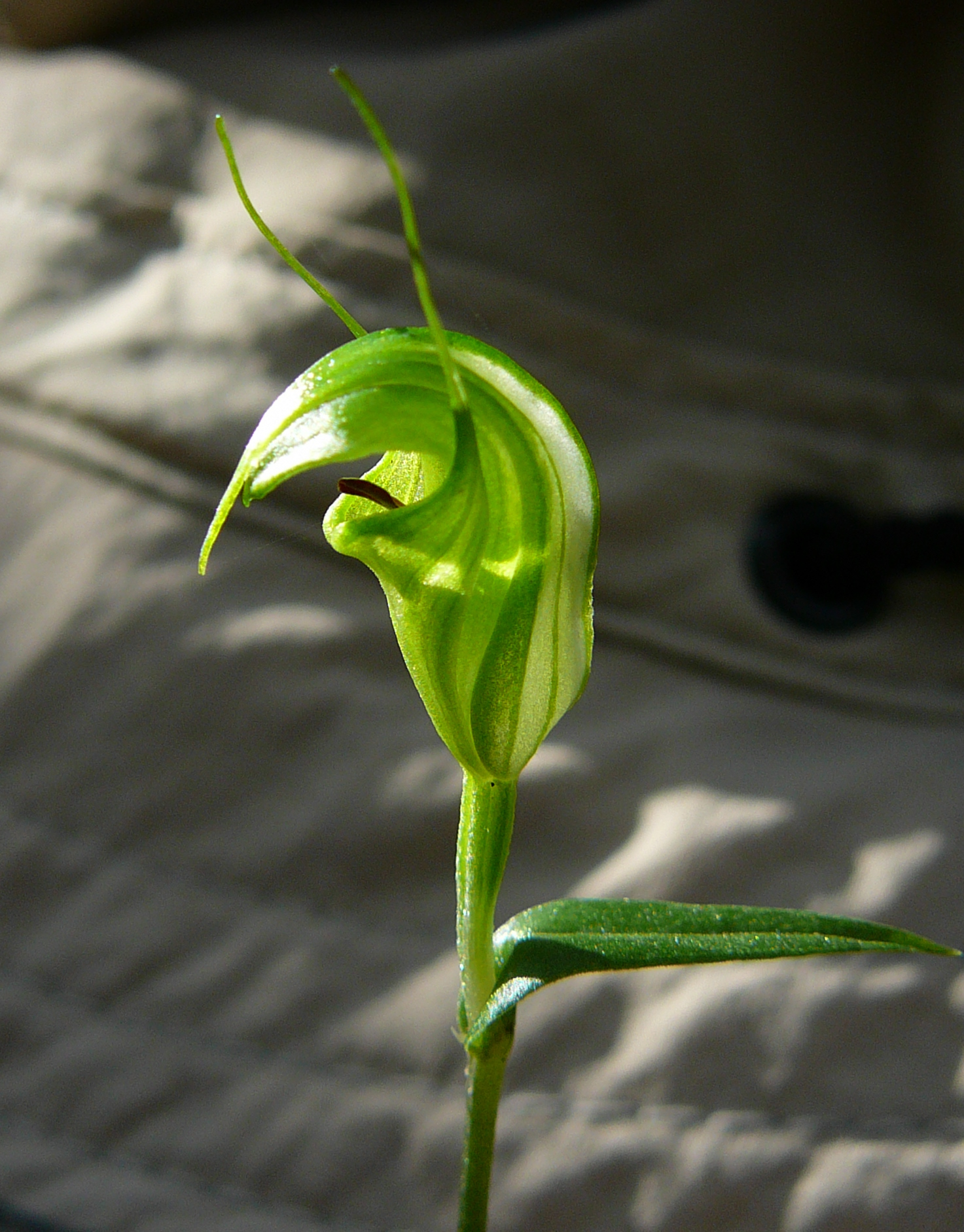
- Pterostylis alveata growing in Beowa National Park

Scientific classification
- Kingdom: Plantae
- Clade: Tracheophytes
- Clade: Angiosperms
- Clade: Monocots
- Order: Asparagales
- Family: Orchidaceae
- Subfamily: Orchidoideae
- Tribe: Cranichideae
- Genus: Pterostylis
- Species: P. alveata

Binomial name
- Pterostylis alveata Garnet

Synonyms
- Diplodium alveatum (Garnet) D.L.Jones & M.A.Clem.; Pterostylis crypta Nicholls; Pterostylis sp. aff. alveata (Montane); Pterostylis obtusa auct. non R.Br.: Rupp, H.M.R. (January 1944)

= Pterostylis alveata =

Coastal greenhood

Species of orchid

Pterostylis alveata, commonly known as coastal greenhood, is a species of orchid endemic to south-eastern Australia. As with similar greenhoods, the flowering plants differ from those which are not flowering. In this species, the non-flowering plants have a rosette of leaves flat on the ground but the flowering plants have a single small, shiny green and white flower with leaves on the flowering spike.

== Description ==
Pterostylis alveata is a terrestrial, perennial, deciduous, herb with an underground tuber and when not flowering, a rosette of dark green leaves, each leaf 10–25 mm long and 5–15 mm wide. Flowering plants have a single flower 12–15 mm long and 7–10 mm wide borne on a spike 100–200 mm high with between three and five spreading stem leaves. The flowers are shiny green and white. The dorsal sepal and petals are fused, forming a hood or "galea" over the column. The dorsal sepal curves forward with a pointed tip. The lateral sepals are held closely against the galea, have a thread-like tip 12–15 mm long and a flat, protruding sinus between their bases. The labellum is 8–9 mm long, 3 mm wide, dark brown and blunt, just visible above the sinus. Flowering occurs from May to June.

== Taxonomy and naming ==
Pterostylis alveata was first formally described in 1939 by John ("Ros") Garnet from a specimen collected on Snake Island. The description was published in The Victorian Naturalist. The specific epithet (alveata) is a Latin word meaning "hollowed out".

== Distribution and habitat ==
Coastal greenhood grows among grasses in moist coastal woodland and scrub between Melbourne in Victoria and Nelson Bay in New South Wales.
