= Elizabeth Conabere =

Australian botanical artist and scientific illustrator (1929–2009)

- Born: 3 June 1929; Alexandra, Victoria, Australia
- Died: 29 October 2009 (aged 80); Mansfield, Victoria, Australia
- Occupations: Botanical artist; writer; conservationist

Elizabeth Vivienne Conabere (3 June 1929 – 29 October 2009) was an Australian botanical artist, writer and conservationist. Conabere provided paintings and illustrations of plants for publications and series of stamps, and exhibited her works in galleries across her home state of Victoria, Australia. Among her works are Wildflowers of South-eastern Australia (1974) and An Australian Countrywoman's Diary (1986). Conabere was also active in conservation institutions.

== Early life ==
Conabere was born in Alexandra, Victoria to Phyllis Balding, an English nurse and Percy Balding, a pharmacist. She grew up in Mansfield, Victoria. Conabere took art training and fashion design in Melbourne. In the early 1950s, she was married to Roly Conabere; they had one son. The marriage ended in the 1960s. Conabere then returned to Mansfield, Victoria, where she bought a cottage and lived until her death on 29 October 2009.

== Career ==
In the 1960s, Conabere started painting. The National Herbarium of Victoria in 1965 commissioned her for a series of 50 illustrations of alpine plants. In 1969, Conabere was commissioned for what would become the two-volume Wildflowers of South-eastern Australia. Conabere illustrated 384 wildflower paintings for the book, which formed 80 plates. It was published in 1974, with the Australian botanist John Roslyn Garnet providing the text. In the early 1970s, Conabere had spent time at the home of the Australian botanist Jean Galbraith, where she painted flowers for her book.

Conabere painted a series of what she titled Beautiful Noxious Weeds for the Victorian Lands Department, which were exhibited across galleries in Victoria in the 1970s and which were included in the 1986 Atlas of Victoria. The set of watercolours is now housed at the Royal Botanic Gardens Victoria. Conabere also illustrated three series of stamps – of roses, eucalyptus and wildflowers – for Australia Post.

An Australian Countrywoman's Diary, written and illustrated by Conabere, was published in 1986, in which she also expressed her opposition to environmental destruction.

Conabere was a founding member of the Society of Wildlife Artists, where she also exhibited. She was also involved in the Conservation Council of Victoria and the Australian Conservation Foundation.

== Bibliography ==
- Conabere, Elizabeth.; Garnet, J. Ros. (1974): Wildflowers Of South-eastern Australia. Melbourne : Nelson.
- Conabere, Elizabeth (1986): An Australian Country Woman's Diary. Sydney : Collins.
