= Eucalyptus arenicola =

Holey Plains peppermint

Conservation status
- Vulnerable (IUCN 3.1)

Scientific classification
- Kingdom: Plantae
- Clade: Tracheophytes
- Clade: Angiosperms
- Clade: Eudicots
- Clade: Rosids
- Order: Myrtales
- Family: Myrtaceae
- Genus: Eucalyptus
- Species: E. arenicola

Binomial name
- Eucalyptus arenicola Rule

Species of eucalyptus

Eucalyptus arenicola, commonly known as the Holey Plains peppermint or Gippsland Lakes peppermint, is a tree or mallee that is endemic to south-east coastal areas of Victoria. It has rough, fibrous bark on its trunk and branches, glossy green, lance-shaped adult leaves, club-shaped buds arranged in groups of eleven to twenty five, white flowers and cup-shaped to hemispherical fruit.

== Description ==
Eucalyptus arenicola is a tree or a mallee, growing to a height of about 4–12 m (10–40 ft) with rough, greyish, fibrous bark on the trunk and branches. The leaves on young plants are arranged in opposite pairs, more or less linear to lance-shaped or egg-shaped, 50–110 mm (2–4 in) long, 8–16 mm (0.3–0.6 in) wide, bluish green on the upper surface and whitish below. The adult leaves are lance-shaped, often curved, 70–140 mm (2.8–5.5 in) long and 9–17 mm (0.4–0.7 in) wide on a petiole up to 16 mm (0.63 in) long. They are more or less the same colour on both surfaces. The flower buds are arranged in groups of eleven to twenty five on a peduncle 2–15 mm (0.08–0.6 in) long, the individual buds on a pedicel 2–6 mm (0.08–0.2 in) long. The mature buds are green to yellow, oval to club-shaped with a rounded operculum. Flowering occurs in winter and the flowers are white. The fruit is cup-shaped to hemispherical, 5–7 mm (0.2–0.3 in) long and 7–9 mm (0.3–0.4 in) wide.

== Taxonomy and naming ==
Eucalyptus arenicola was first formally described in 2008 by Kevin James Rule and the description was published in the journal Muelleria. The specific epithet (arenicola) is derived from the Latin words arena meaning "sand", and -cola meaning "dweller", referring to the species' habitat.

== Distribution and habitat ==
The Holey Plains peppermint grows in sandy soils in coastal and near-coastal areas near the Gippsland Lakes between Bairnsdale and the Holey Plains.
