= Australian Natural History Medallion =

Annual award

The Australian Natural History Medallion is awarded each year by the Field Naturalists Club of Victoria (FNCV) to the person judged to have made the most meritorious contribution to the understanding of Australian natural history. The idea originated with J. K. Moir, a book collector and member of the Bread and Cheese Club. Moir wrote to the FNCV in 1939 suggesting that such a medallion should be awarded to a person who had performed, in his words, "a signal service" to the protection of flora and fauna—"a variation of the Nobel awards". Nominations for the Medallion are made by field naturalist clubs and kindred bodies from all over Australia, each nomination being valid for a three-year period. The Medallion has usually been awarded annually since 1940. In that time, recipients have been honoured for their work in many fields of natural history studies, and have come from every state and territory in Australia.

The recipients are:

- 1940 – Alexander Hugh Chisholm
- 1941 – Frederick Chapman
- 1942 – David Fleay
- 1943 – Herbert Ward Wilson
- 1944 – John McConnell Black
- 1945 – Charles P. Mountford
- 1946 – Heber A. Longman
- 1947 – Philip Crosbie Morrison
- 1948 – Ludwig Glauert
- 1949 – Edith Coleman
- 1950 – Bernard C. Cotton
- 1951 – Tarlton Rayment
- 1952 – John Burton Cleland
- 1953 – Charles Leslie Barrett
- 1954 – Herman M. R. Rupp
- 1955 – Stanley R. Mitchell
- 1956 – Dominic Louis Serventy
- 1957 – Charles Ernest William Bryant
- 1958 – Charles J. Gabriel
- 1959 – Keith Alfred Hindwood
- 1960 – James Hamlyn Willis
- 1961 – Emil H. Zeck
- 1962 – Norman Arthur Wakefield
- 1963 – Thistle Y. Stead
- 1964 – Winifred Waddell
- 1965 – Roy Wheeler
- 1966 – J. Ros Garnet
- 1967 – Gilbert P. Whitley
- 1968 – Norman Barnett Tindale
- 1969 – Charles Austin Gardner
- 1970 – Jean Galbraith
- 1971 – Alexander Clifford Beauglehole
- 1972 – Allen Axel Strom
- 1973 – Edmund D. Gill
- 1974 – Vincent Serventy
- 1975 – Alison M. Ashby
- 1976 – Winifred M. Curtis
- 1977 – John Russell (Jack) Wheeler
- 1978 – Allan Roy Sefton
- 1979 – Helen Aston
- 1980 – Michael Tyler
- 1981 – Elizabeth Marks
- 1982 – Howard Jarman
- 1983 – Trevor Pescott
- 1984 – Kevin Keneally
- 1985 – Jack Hyett
- 1986 – Graham Pizzey
- 1987 – Robert G. H. Green
- 1988 – John Dell
- 1989 – Bruce A. Fuhrer
- 1990 – Ellen McCulloch
- 1991 – Fred J. C. Rogers
- 1992 – Enid L. Robertson
- 1993 – Alan J. Reid
- 1994 – Joan Cribb
- 1995 – W. Rodger Elliott
- 1996 – Ken N.G. Simpson
- 1997 – Geoffrey Monteith
- 1998 – Peter W. Menkhorst
- 1999 – Mary P. Cameron
- 2000 – Malcolm Calder
- 2001 – Alan B. Cribb
- 2002 – Ian D. Endersby
- 2003 – Clive Dudley Thomas Minton
- 2004 – David Lindenmayer
- 2005 – Pauline Reilly
- 2006 – Ian Fraser
- 2007 – Jeanette Covacevich
- 2008 – Ern Perkins
- 2009 – Richard Shine
- 2010 – Don P. A. Sands
- 2011 – John Woinarski
- 2012 – No award made
- 2013 – Marilyn Hewish
- 2014 – Tom May
- 2015 – Margaret MacDonald
- 2016 – Max S. Moulds
- 2017 – Paul Adam
- 2018 – Sarah Lloyd
- 2019 – Simon Grove
- 2020 – Craig Morley
- 2021 – Peter Latz
- 2022 – Genevieve Gates
- 2023 – Maureen Christie
- 2024 – Euan Ritchie
- 2025 – Roger Thomas
