= Roy Percy Cooper =

Roy Percy Cooper (21 December 1907 – 1 October 1976) was an Australian accountant and amateur ornithologist. He was a Council member of the Royal Australasian Ornithologists Union, serving as the society's president from 1960 to 1961 and Editor of the scientific journal Emu from 1960 to 1962. He was also President of the Bird Observers Club from 1954 to 1955 and editor of its journal, the Australian Bird Watcher, from 1959 to 1976.

== Bibliography ==
- Cooper, Roy P. (1967). Birds of a Salt-Field. Imperial Chemical Industries of Australia and New Zealand Ltd: Melbourne.
- Cooper, Roy P. (1975). Wilson's Promontory National Park and Its Avifauna. Bird Observers Club: Melbourne.
