= Leioproctus coracinus =

Scientific classification
- Kingdom: Animalia
- Phylum: Arthropoda
- Clade: Pancrustacea
- Class: Insecta
- Order: Hymenoptera
- Family: Colletidae
- Genus: Leioproctus
- Species: L. coracinus

Binomial name
- Leioproctus coracinus Batley, 2025

Species of bee

Leioproctus coracinus, or Leioproctus (Leioproctus) coracinus, is a species of bee in the family Colletidae and subfamily Colletinae. It is endemic to Australia. It was described by entomologist Michael Batley in 2025.

== Etymology ==
The specific epithet coracinus (Latin: "crow") refers to the predominantly black colour.

== Description ==
The holotype female body length is 12.2 mm, head width 3.7 mm; male body length 11.0 mm, head width 3.2 mm. Integumental colouration is mainly black with brown markings. The hair is white to brown.

== Distribution and habitat ==
The species occurs in eastern New South Wales. The type locality is Clarence.

== Behaviour ==
The adults are flying mellivores. Flowering plants visited by the bees include Boronia microphylla.

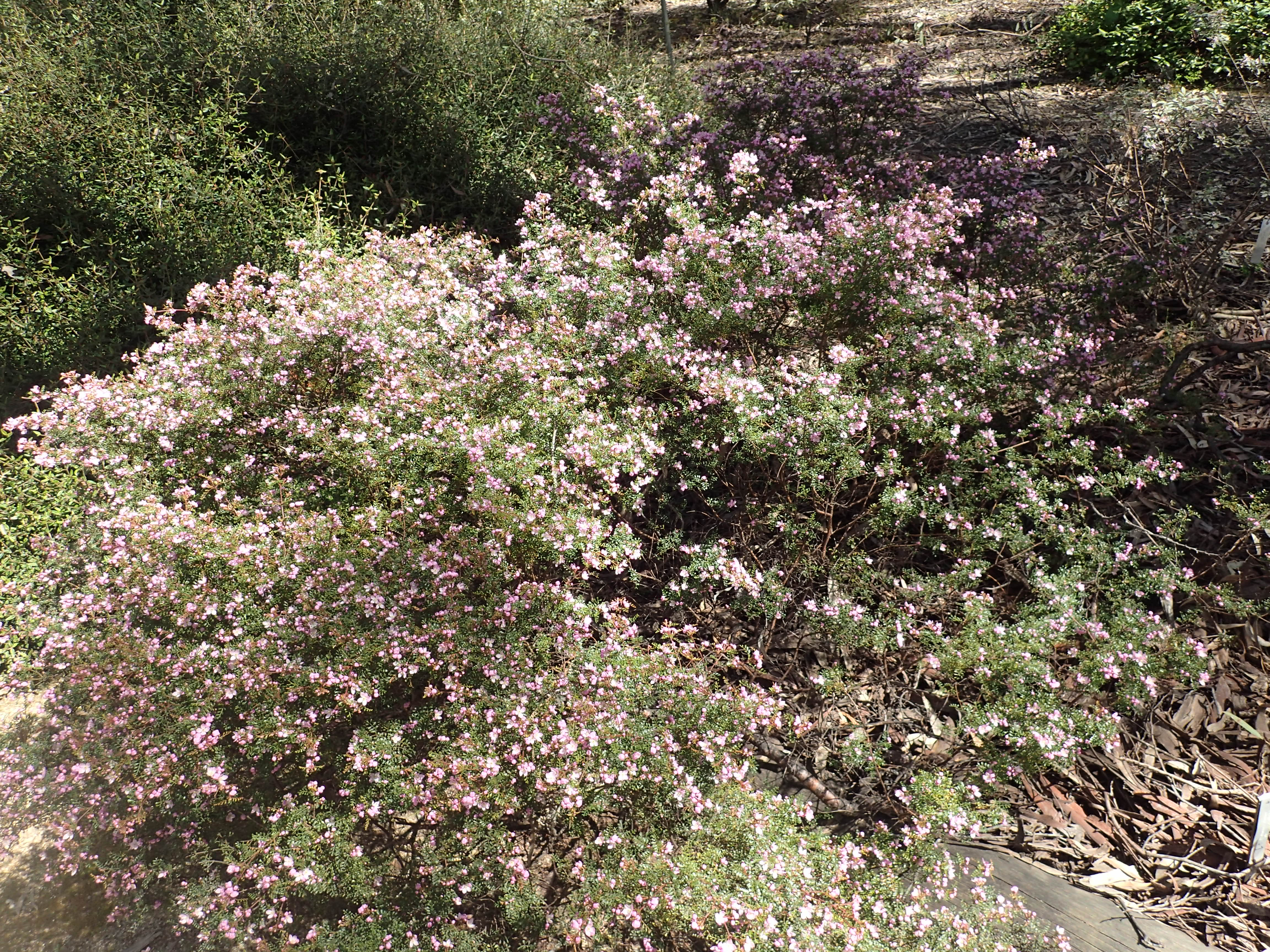
Boronia microphylla (small-leaved boronia), a forage plant of the bees

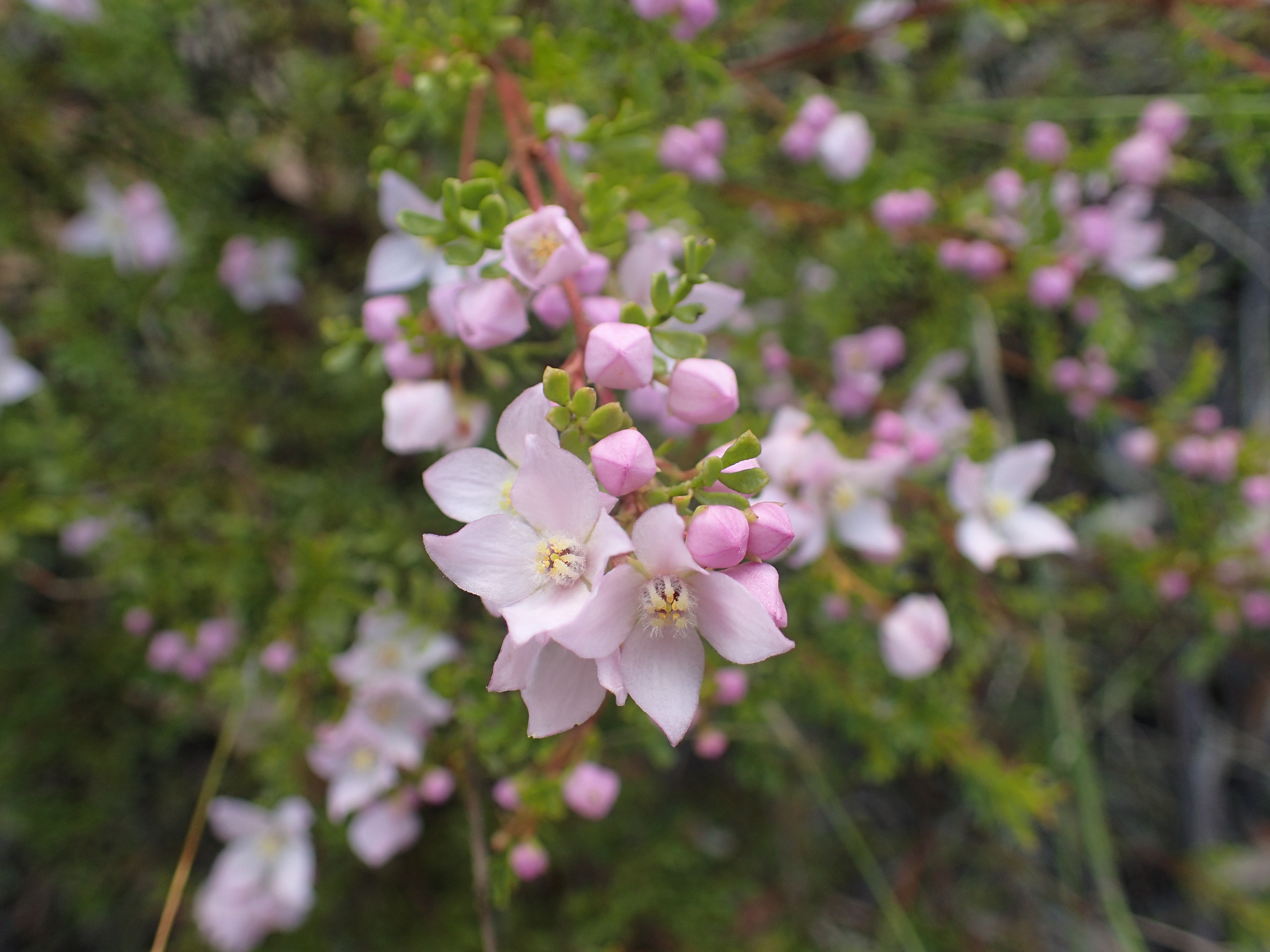
Flowers of Boronia microphylla
