= John McKean (ornithologist) =

Australian ornithologist

John Leonard McKean (1941 – 16 February 1996) was an Australian ornithologist. He published around 100 scientific papers on birds and bats. He was a bird and bat bander and major contributor to the Australian Bird and Bat Banding Scheme.

As well as being a professional ornithologist with the CSIRO's Division of Wildlife Research, McKean was an enthusiastic twitcher, holding the record for the highest number of species of Australian birds seen in one year, 535, until 1979 when this was surpassed by Roy Wheeler. He was also involved with the Royal Australasian Ornithologists Union's Atlas of Australian Birds project.
