= Jack Hyett =

Australian teacher, broadcaster, author, naturalist and ornithologist

Jack Hyett (11 July 1915 – 21 July 2001) was an Australian teacher, broadcaster, author, naturalist and amateur ornithologist. He was born in Ballarat, Victoria. He was the founding president of the Victorian Ornithological Research Group and the Ringwood Field Naturalists Club. He was editor of the Emu, the journal of the Royal Australasian Ornithologists Union 1965–1968. His enthusiasm as a field naturalist led also to his being made an honorary life member of the Field Ornithology Group of Sri Lanka in 1980, leading natural history tours overseas and in Australia, as well as lecturing frequently on natural history on radio and television. In 1985, he was awarded the Australian Natural History Medallion.

As well as numerous journal and magazine articles, books authored by Hyett include:

- 1959 - A Bushman's Year. F.W. Cheshire: Melbourne
- 1961 - A Bushman's Harvest. F.W. Cheshire: Melbourne
- 1982 - Koalas, wombats and possums
- 1982 - Platypuses & other primitive animals
