= Emil Hermann Zeck =

Australian entomologist and scientific illustrator (1891–1963)

Emil Hermann Zeck (16 November 1891 – 3 September 1963) was an Australian entomologist and biological illustrator. He was highly respected for his beautiful and scientifically accurate illustrations, especially of insects.

== Life ==
Zeck was born in Sydney. His artistic talent was recognised early and from 1908 to 1923 he worked as an entomological illustrator at the Government Printing Office in Sydney. He subsequently joined the staff of the New South Wales Department of Agriculture as an entomologist and remained there until his retirement in 1956.

== Honours and awards ==
- Fellow of the Royal Zoological Society of New South Wales (1951)
- Australian Natural History Medallion (1961)
