= H. W. Wilson =

H. W. Wilson could refer to:

- Herbert Wrigley Wilson (1866−1940), British journalist and naval historian
- Halsey William Wilson (1868−1954), American publisher and bibliographer
  - H. W. Wilson Company, American publisher and indexing company founded by Halsey William Wilson
- Herbert Ward Wilson (1877−1955), Australian science lecturer and naturalist
