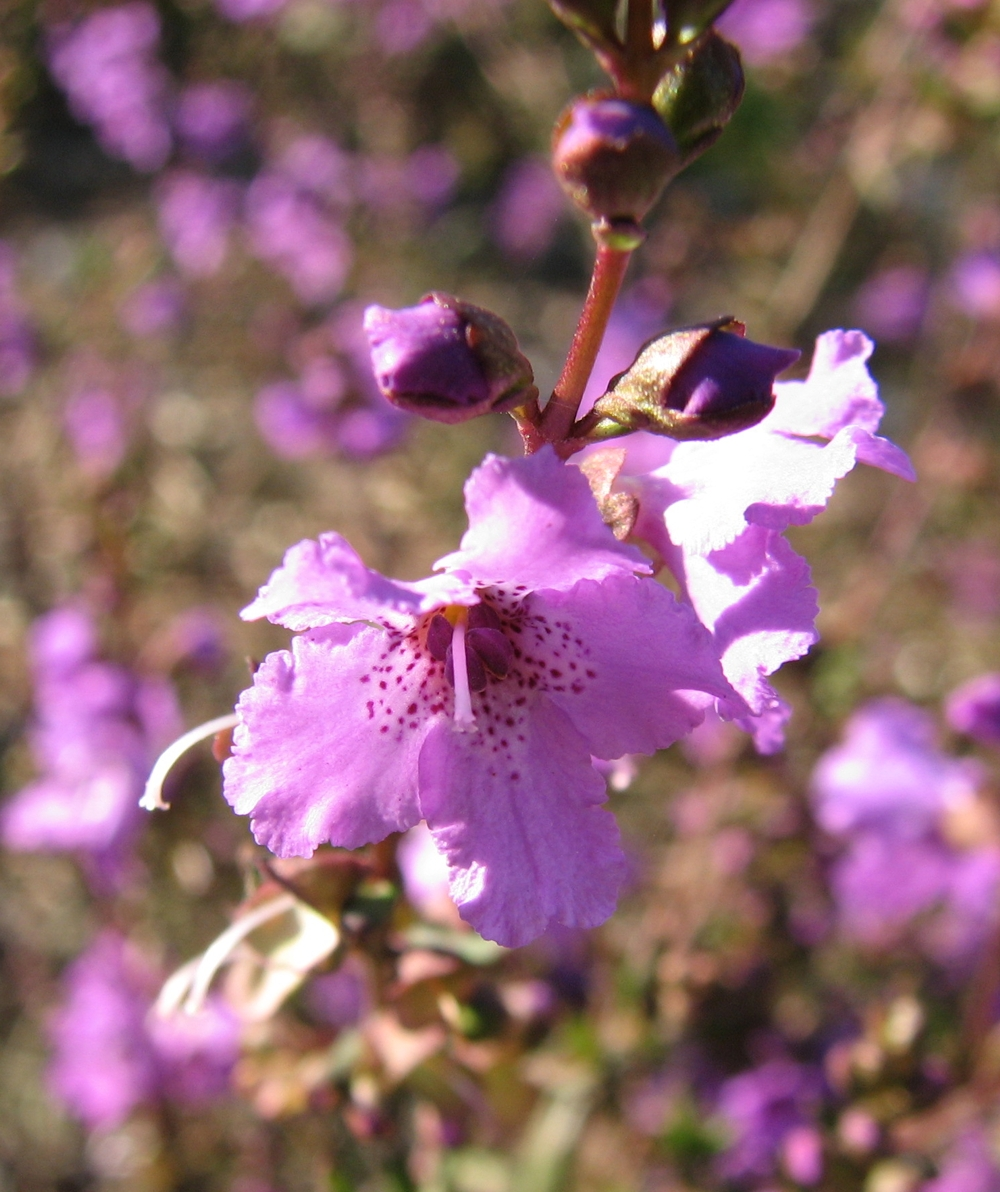
- In Royal Botanic Gardens Victoria

Conservation status
- Vulnerable (EPBC Act)

Scientific classification
- Kingdom: Plantae
- Clade: Tracheophytes
- Clade: Angiosperms
- Clade: Eudicots
- Clade: Asterids
- Order: Lamiales
- Family: Lamiaceae
- Genus: Prostanthera
- Species: P. galbraithiae

Binomial name
- Prostanthera galbraithiae B.J.Conn
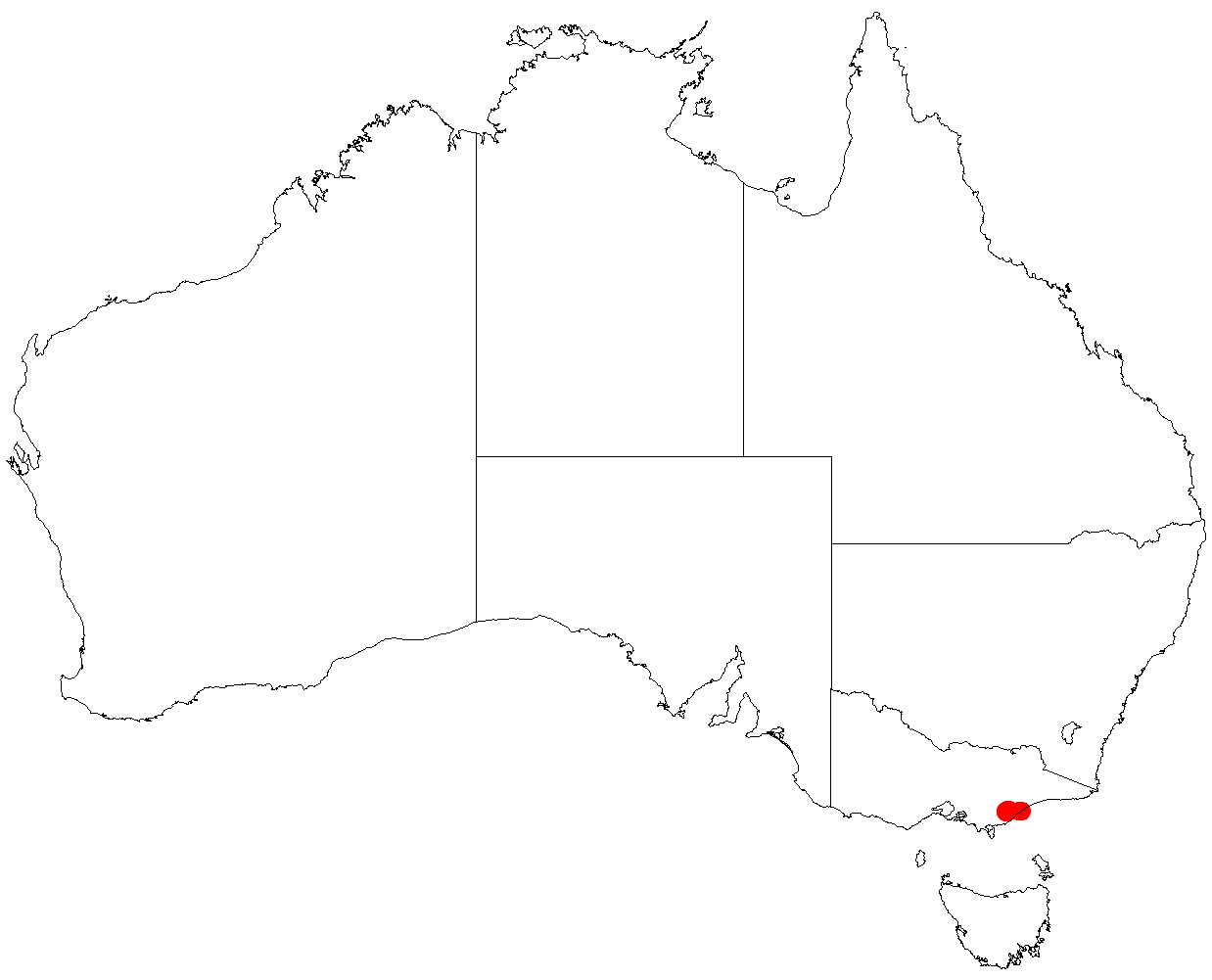
- Occurrence data from AVH

= Prostanthera galbraithiae =

Wellington mint-bush

Species of flowering plant

Prostanthera galbraithiae, commonly known as Wellington mint-bush, is a species of flowering plant in the family Lamiaceae and is endemic to Victoria in Australia. It is an erect or spreading shrub with densely hairy branches that are more or less square in cross-section, narrow egg-shaped or oblong leaves with the edges rolled under, and deep mauve to purple flowers with maroon dots inside the petal tube.

== Description ==
Prostanthera galbraithiae is an erect or spreading shrub that typically grows to a height of 0.1–2 m (3.9 in – 6 ft 6.7 in) and has densely hairy branches that are more or less square in cross-section. It has mid-green, narrow egg-shaped or oblong leaves that are aromatic when crushed, 8–15 mm (0.31–0.59 in) long, up to 2 mm (0.079 in) wide and sessile. The flowers are arranged in 8 to 24 leaf axils near the ends of the branchlets, each flower on a pedicel 1.5–3 mm (0.059–0.118 in) long. The sepals are green on the upper surface, maroon below and form a tube 2–2.5 mm (0.079–0.098 in) long with two lobes 2–3 mm (0.079–0.118 in) long. The petals are 7–10 mm (0.28–0.39 in) long, deep-mauve to purple with maroon spots in the centre and form a tube 3–3.5 mm (0.12–0.14 in) long with two lips. The lower lip has three lobes, the central lobe 4–4.5 mm (0.16–0.18 in) long and 3.5–5 mm (0.14–0.20 in) wide and the side lobes 3.5–4 mm (0.14–0.16 in) long and 3–3.5 mm (0.12–0.14 in) wide. The upper lobe is 3.5–5 mm (0.14–0.20 in) long and 6.5–7 mm (0.26–0.28 in) wide. Flowering occurs from September to October.

== Taxonomy ==
Prostanthera galbraithiae was first formally described by botanist Barry Conn in 1998 in the journal Telopea. The specific epithet is named for Jean Galbraith, a member of the Latrobe Valley Field Naturalists, who co-discovered the species and advocated for its protection.

== Distribution and habitat ==
Wellington mint-bush occurs on sandy soils over clay on the Gippsland plains in Holey Plains State Park. It is associated with Eucalyptus obliqua woodland with a heathy understorey including species such as Acacia oxycedrus, Epacris impressa, Lepidosperma concavum, Leptospermum myrsinoides and Platylobium obtusangulum.

== Conservation status ==
This species is classified as "vulnerable" under the Australian Government Environment Protection and Biodiversity Conservation Act 1999, as "threatened" under the Victorian Government Flora and Fauna Guarantee Act 1988. The main threats to the species include inappropriate fire regimes, firebreak maintenance, herbicide use and competition from bracken fern Pteridium esculentum. It can become locally common after fire. Fire intervals of less than 10 years may limit soil seed bank replenishment, and fire intervals greater than 20 years may diminish seedbank persistence. Low fire intensity may also limit germination of soil stored seed.
