= Victorian Wader Study Group =

The Victorian Wader Study Group (VWSG) is an Australian non-profit, volunteer, ornithological fieldwork group that gathers biometric and other data on waders and terns, mainly through regular catches of large samples of several species by cannon-netting at sites along the coast of Victoria.

== History ==
The origins of the VWSG go back to 1975 when Dr David Robertson and others started mist-netting waders at night. The first place they tried was in the Cheetham Salt Works at Altona, though better results were obtained later at a coastal site adjacent to the Werribee Sewage Farm, near the town of Werribee, 30 km south-west of Melbourne on Port Phillip.

In 1978 the group was joined by Dr Clive Minton, who had been a pioneer in the development of cannon-netting in Britain as a means of catching large numbers of waders and waterfowl for banding and demographic studies. Minton introduced the technique to the group, with the first cannon-net catch being made at Werribee on 31 December 1978. Thereafter, although the group continued to use mist-netting occasionally for a few years, cannon-netting became the principal method used for catching waders.

At first operating under the aegis of the Victorian Ornithological Research Group, the VWSG was formally established as an independent body in 1979, with David Robertson and Clive Minton elected as co-convenors. Since 1981 it has had a close relationship with the Australasian Wader Studies Group (AWSG), a special interest group of Birds Australia. The VWSG was incorporated in Victoria in 1987. The group's mission is to

" …gather, through extensive planned fieldwork programs, comprehensive data on waders and terns throughout Victoria on a long-term basis. This scientifically collected information is intended to form a factual base for conservation considerations, to be a source of information for education of a wider audience, to be a means of generating interest of the general community in environmental and conservation issues, and so be a major contribution to Australian, Flyway and Worldwide knowledge of waders and terns."

The VWSG has a membership of about 150, mainly based in Melbourne, and publishes an annual bulletin. As well as conducting fieldwork, it has constructed cannon-nets for, and lent equipment to, other organisations in Australia to encourage more widespread research on waders. It also assists government agencies monitoring migratory birds as potential disease vectors for avian influenza.

== Fieldwork ==
As well as Werribee, a site which has become relatively less important over the years, the principal regular fieldwork areas of the VWSG include Swan Bay, Western Port, Anderson Inlet and Corner Inlet. Annual visits are made to Mud Islands in Port Phillip, south-eastern South Australia and King Island, Tasmania, as well as occasionally elsewhere. VWSG equipment and members usually form the core of the almost annual expeditions of the AWSG to north-west Western Australia.

The average number of cannon-netting catches made by the VWSG is over 40 a year, with an average annual total of over 7000 waders processed. Principal species caught are red-necked stint, curlew sandpiper, sharp-tailed sandpiper, red knot, sanderling, double-banded plover, bar-tailed godwit, ruddy turnstone, pied oystercatcher and sooty oystercatcher. The main tern species studied are crested and Caspian terns, with other species studied opportunistically.

== Conservation ==
Victoria lies at the southern end of the East Asian - Australasian Flyway, and the migratory waders that visit its shores breed in northern Asia and Alaska, passing through the densely populated and rapidly developing regions of eastern and south-eastern Asia on their journeys twice a year. Over the years the VWSG has been operating, the emphasis of fieldwork has evolved from simply obtaining biometric and moult data to understand the biology of the birds, to obtaining information on breeding success and survival rates to understand and monitor population levels in the flyway. Most migratory waders caught by the VWSG are fitted with colour-coded plastic leg-flags in a flyway-based program to determine the exact routes and staging areas used by the birds on migration. The group is also assisting with the satellite tracking of larger waders.
