= The Big Twitch =

Book by Sean Dooley

- Author: Sean Dooley
- Language: English
- Publisher: Allen & Unwin
- Publication date: 2005
- Publication place: Australia
- Pages: 322
- ISBN: 1-74114-528-7

The Big Twitch is a 2005 non-fiction book by Australian writer Sean Dooley. It covers his 2002 attempt to break the record and see more than 700 birds in Australia in one year.
