= Clive Minton =

Australian ornithologist (1934–2019)

Clive Dudley Thomas Minton, AM (7 October 1934 – 6 November 2019) was a British and Australian metallurgist, administrator, management consultant and amateur ornithologist. His interest in birds began in childhood.

== Early life ==
Born in England, Minton attended Oundle School and went on to complete a PhD degree in Metallurgy at the University of Cambridge. Although involved in studies of various species of birds, his main focus became the migratory waders. He became the founding chairman of the Wash Wader Ringing Group and was associated with the development of cannon-netting, especially as a means of catching large numbers of waders for banding and demographic studies.

== Life in Australia ==
In 1978, Minton moved to Australia as managing director of Imperial Metal Industries Australia in Melbourne, Victoria. There he revitalised wader studies through the introduction of cannon-netting to the Victorian Wader Study Group (VWSG), which became one of the most active banding groups in the world. He was also instrumental in the formation of the Australasian Wader Studies Group (AWSG) of which he was founding chair, as well as in the establishment of Broome Bird Observatory.

From the early 1980s, Minton led regular, almost annual, wader study expeditions to north-west Australia to catch and study the waders that migrate to and through the coastal strip between Roebuck Bay near Broome, Eighty Mile Beach and Port Hedland in the southern section of the East Asian – Australasian Flyway. These expeditions, along with data collected in south-eastern Australia by the VWSG, have led to major governmental conservation initiatives through the Flyway, including the Japan Australia Migratory Bird Agreement (JAMBA), the China Australia Migratory Bird Agreement (CAMBA) and the East Asian – Australasian Shorebird Site Network. He was also involved in several international wader study expeditions in North America, South America and Russia.

Minton served the Royal Australasian Ornithologists Union (RAOU) on its Research Committee from 1980 to 1988, and as vice-president from 1989 to 1995.

== Awards and honours ==
- 1975 – awarded Bernard Tucker Medal for services to ornithology
- 1998 – elected a Fellow of the RAOU
- 2000 – awarded John Hobbs Medal for outstanding contributions to ornithology as an amateur
- 2001 – elected a Member of the Order of Australia for "services to ornithology, particularly in the study of migratory wading birds in Australia"
- 2003 – awarded Australian Natural History Medallion
- 2012 – awarded Eisenmann Medal

In 2003, British ornithologist Andrew Whittaker commemorated Minton in the species epithet of the cryptic forest falcon (Micrastur mintoni).

To honour Minton's role in the establishment of the Broome Bird Observatory, the Clive Minton Discovery Centre opened its doors on the 20 August 2021 after four years of development. The centre displays information about migratory shorebirds, with immersive soundscapes, video footage, and up-to-date scientific information.

== See also ==
- List of ornithologists
