= Land for Wildlife =

Former government program in Victoria, Australia

Land for Wildlife was a program sponsored by the Department of Sustainability and Environment in the state of Victoria, Australia. The program ended in 2025 with participants directed to the Trust for Nature program. It was established in November 1981 to support private landholders and managers who voluntarily provide and enhance habitat for native wildlife on their properties within the state. Many non-landholder volunteers also participate in the program, which is coordinated by departmental extension officers. By doing so they are contributing to the maintenance and restoration of native biodiversity. The program was largely instigated by Ellen McCulloch and Reg Johnson, two prominent members of the community group Bird Observation & Conservation Australia (then the Bird Observers Club – now merged with BirdLife Australia), with which it continues to have a cooperative relationship.

Benefits of full registration of a property in the program include on-site visits to provide advice and answer questions about how to manage the land to contribute to biodiversity conservation, participation in field and neighbourhood days, open-properties and information sessions, a regular newsletter, specialist information and a Land for Wildlife sign. It does not alter the legal status of a property in any way and landholders may withdraw from the program at any time.

As of 2012 there were over 5,700 participating properties, with about 15,000 people involved in the program. The area of wildlife habitat being managed on the properties totals more than 560,000 hectares (4% of private land in Victoria), and includes grasslands, heaths, woodlands, forests and freshwater wetlands.

The Victorian Land For Wildlife program allows interstate agencies (government and non-government) to deliver the scheme under an agreement in which the original aims and objectives are maintained.
