= Ian Fraser (naturalist) =

Australian naturalist

Ian Thomas Fraser OAM (born 1951) is an Australian naturalist, conservationist and author, based in Canberra, where he arrived from Adelaide in January 1980.

From 1997, he presented a fortnightly natural history show on ABC Radio Canberra, until the station discontinued the program at the end of 2016. He teaches bird and other natural history courses to adult students at the ANU Centre for Continuing Education.

He ran the educational Environment Tours program – natural history bus-based tours throughout Australia – initially in association with the Canberra environment movement from 1984 until retiring at the end of 2016, and since 2006 has worked for Chris Carter of Time Travel Australia leading natural history tours to South America (with single tours to Malaysian Borneo and Madagascar).

He was awarded the Australian Plants Award by the Australian Native Plants Society in 2001, and the Australian Natural History Medallion in 2006. In 2011 his book A Bush Capital Year, written with artist Peter Marsack, was awarded a Whitley Certificate for Best Regional Zoology by the Royal Zoological Society of NSW. In 2013 Australian Bird Names; a complete guide, co-authored with Jeannie Gray, was also awarded a Whitley, this one as best book in the category Zoological Resource.

From 2002 to 2013, he wrote a monthly essay on birds – 100 in all – for Gang-gang, the Newsletter of the Canberra Ornithologists Group.

He served on the Australian Capital Territory (ACT) Natural Resources Management Advisory Committee (and its various predecessors), advising the ACT government on biodiversity issues from its inception in 1984, and chaired it from 2005 until his retirement at the end of 2014.

Since 2012, he has been the author of a natural history blog, Ian Fraser Talking Naturally, now weekly, formerly more frequently, on all aspects of natural history, aiming to bring biological science and conservation principles to a lay audience.

In 2016 he curated, by invitation, a three-month exhibition at the Canberra Museum and Gallery entitled Bush Capital, the natural history of the ACT.

He was awarded a Medal of the Order of Australia in 2018 "for service to conservation and the environment."

He is partnered to former journalist and ABC local radio presenter Louise Maher.

== Bibliography ==
- Above the Cotter; a driver's and walker's guide to the North Brindabellas. Ian Fraser and Margaret McJannett, Canberra and South-East Region Environment Centre, Canberra, 1991 ISBN 0-646-04309-9
- Wild about Canberra; a field guide to the plants and animals of the ACT. Ian Fraser and Margaret McJannett, ACT Parks and Conservation Service, Canberra, 1993 ISBN 1-86331-153-X
- Wildflowers of the Bush Capital; a field guide to Canberra Nature Park. Ian Fraser and Margaret McJannett, Vertego Press, Canberra, 1993 ISBN 0-646-15711-6
- Over the Hills and Tharwa Way; Eastern Namadgi National Park, a driver's and walker's guide. Ian Fraser and Margaret McJannett, Canberra and South-East Region Environment Centre, Canberra, 1994 ISBN 0-646-19029-6
- Neighbours in Trouble! Endangered plants and animals in the ACT. Ian Fraser and Margaret McJannett, Conservation Council of the South-East Region and Canberra, Canberra, 1996.
- Wildflowers of the Snow Country. Ian Fraser and Margaret McJannett, Vertego Press, Canberra, 1998 ISBN 0-646-35260-1
- A Bush Capital Year; a natural history of the Canberra region. Ian Fraser and Peter Marsack, CSIRO Publishing, 2011. ISBN 9780643101555
- Australian Bird Names; a complete guide. Ian Fraser and Jeannie Gray. CSIRO Publishing, 2013. ISBN 9780643104693.
