= Marion Anstis =

Australian herpetologist

Marion Anstis is an Australian herpetologist. Her work focuses on frogs and Tadpoles found in Australia.

== Career ==
Anstis was a music teacher for 31 years before retiring in 2001. Before her retirement, she published 11 papers in scientific journals.

In 2002, she published a book called Tadpoles of South-Eastern Australia which won a Whitley Award. Anstis published a children's book, Frogs and Tadpoles of Australia in 2007.

She submitted her book, Tadpoles and Frogs of Australia as her PhD thesis at Newcastle University in 2012. It was then published in 2013 by New Holland Publishers. It won her another Whitley Award in 2014.

She received grants from the Australian Biological Resources Study in 1999 and in 2006-7 and from WWF in 2003. She was shortlisted for a Eureka Prize in 2003.

A genus of West Australian frog, Anstisia, was named in honor of her in 2022.

== Bibliography ==
- Tadpoles of South-Eastern Australia (2002)
- Frogs and Tadpoles of Australia (2007)
- Tadpoles And Frogs Of Australia (2013)
