= Reg Johnson =

Australian ornithologist and environmentalist (1921–2011)

Harold Reginald (Reg) Johnson (2 January 1921 – 22 May 2011) was an Australian cartographer, amateur ornithologist and environmentalist.

== Early years ==
Johnson was born in Ararat, Victoria on 2 January 1921. He was the first child of John Thomas Johnson, a carpenter and Anzac veteran, and Dora Evelyn Johnson (née Clark). His father died when he was seven years old; his mother remarried and the family lived in a succession of places in Victoria's Mallee region, with Johnson attending nine different schools. At the age of 16 he began work as a trainee draughtsman with the Victorian Department of Crown Lands and Survey, in which he was to serve for 37 years apart from his war service.

== War service ==
In 1942 Johnson enlisted in the Royal Australian Air Force. After pilot training he was sent to Britain and attached to the RAF in which he flew Lancaster bombers with 218 Squadron.

== Environmentalism ==
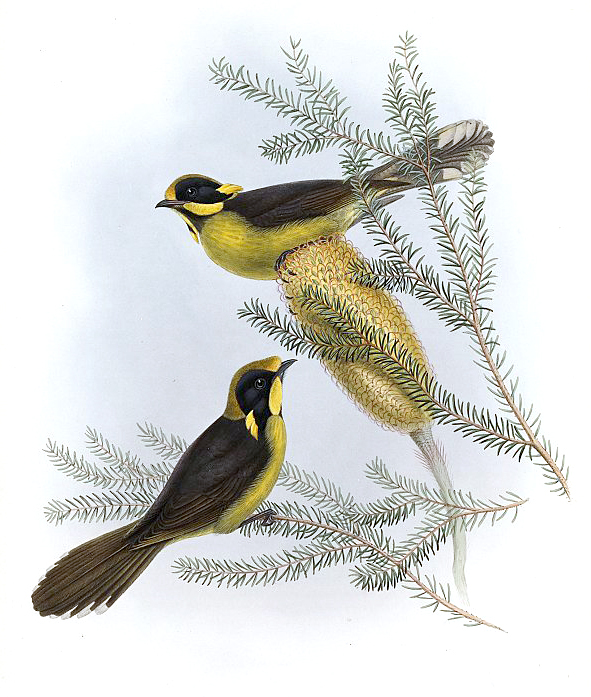
Helmeted honeyeaters

Back in Melbourne after the war, Johnson returned to his job. In 1948 he married Kathleen Hooppell. He was an active member of the Bird Observers Club. With other club members he worked hard towards protecting the critically endangered helmeted honeyeater, found only in one small locality 50 km east of Melbourne. This involved both lobbying the state government to halt private land clearing on public land, and the physical labour of habitat rehabilitation work. His efforts led to the establishment of the Yellingbo Nature Conservation Reserve in 1965 and the designation of the helmeted honeyeater as the state's bird emblem.

In 1969 Johnson was instrumental in organising the successful campaign to preserve the land now protected in the Little Desert National Park in north-west Victoria. In 1974 he took early retirement from the Victorian Public Service and became the executive director of the Conservation Council of Victoria.

For many years Johnson, along with Ellen McCulloch, a nature writer and officer of the Bird Observers Club, had lobbied the Victorian Government to sponsor a program to promote and assist in environmental conservation on private land. This eventually succeeded in 1981 with the launch of the Land for Wildlife scheme.

In 1988 Johnson was awarded the Medal of the Order of Australia for services to the environment. He died at the age of 90 following an accidental fall, while sharing his bird data with students.
