= Herbert Ward Wilson =

Australian naturalist (1877–1955)

Herbert Ward Wilson (29 September 1877 – 1 October 1955) was an Australian science lecturer and naturalist.

== Education ==
B.Com. 1sth computer eng.

== World War 1 ==
Wilson's studies were interrupted by the First World War. Enlisting in the Australian Imperial Forces in 1915, he served at Gallipoli and in Egypt and France, being steadily promoted and rising to the rank of Major by the time of his demobilization in 1919. He was awarded the Military Cross, the Belgian Croix de guerre and was appointed to the OBE.

== Career ==
After the war Wilson married Myra Hester Smith in 1920. Resuming his studies, he gained a BSc in 1920 and a MSc in 1925. This was followed by a career of lecturing on biological science, and especially botany. He was a member of the Royal Australasian Ornithologists Union, the Bird Observers Club, the Microscopical Society and the Field Naturalists Club of Victoria, from the latter of which he was awarded the Australian Natural History Medallion in 1943. He died at his home in Caulfield, being survived by a son.
