= Ellen McCulloch =

Australian nature writer

Ellen Margery McCulloch OAM (23 April 1930 – 13 November 2005) was a Melbourne-based Australian nature writer and amateur ornithologist who had a long association with Bird Observation & Conservation Australia (BOCA, formerly the Bird Observers Club).

== Life ==
McCulloch became a member of the Bird Observers Club in 1963, and of the Royal Australasian Ornithologists Union (RAOU, now Birds Australia) in 1964. She served the RAOU as its publicity officer in 1968–1969, and as an inaugural member of its Field Investigation Committee 1970–1973. She also served as the Honorary Secretary of BOCA 1975–1982, and subsequently for many years as its public relations officer. She gave lectures and ran tours for the Council for Adult Education in Melbourne. With Reg Johnson she was one of the main instigators of the Land for Wildlife scheme, established in 1981 to support the conservation efforts of private landholders in Victoria. She also represented BOCA on various government and academic committees related to animal ethics and bird protection.

== Honours ==
- 1985 – Life membership of the Bird Observers Club
- 1990 – Australian Natural History Medallion
- 1991 – Order of Australia Medal

== Publications ==
As well as numerous articles about birds, books authored or co-authored by McCulloch include:

- 1970 – Some Garden Birds of South-East Australia. (With Tess Kloot, illustrated by Rex Davies). Collins: Sydney. ISBN 0-00-735118-6
- 1980 – Birds of Australian Gardens. (With Tess Kloot, illustrated by Peter Trusler). Rigby: Australia. ISBN 0-7270-1353-X
- 1980 – Birds of Blackburn Lake, City of Nunawading. (With Geoff Deason, Rex Buckingham and Frank Stephens). Bird Observers Club: Melbourne.
- 1987 – Your Garden Birds. Hyland House: Melbourne. ISBN 0-947062-13-0
- 2000 – Birds in Your Garden. Hyland House: Melbourne. ISBN 1-86447-083-6
