= Charles Ernest William Bryant =

Australian barrister (1902–1960)

Charles Ernest William Bryant (1902–1960) was a barrister and amateur ornithologist. He was admitted to the Victorian Bar in 1929. He first joined Vowell & A’Beckett and later was a partner in Moule, Hamilton and Derham, a Melbourne firm of barristers and solicitors.

A member of the Royal Australasian Ornithologists Union (RAOU), he was editor of its journal, the Emu, from 1929 to 1960, the year of his death, a period of 31 years. He also served on the RAOU Checklist Committee 1938–1960, and as RAOU President 1955–1957.

He had a wife, Dulcie, and they had a son, David. Bryant died at his home from a heart attack on 27 October 1960. He accumulated a considerable collection of books in his lifetime with works on ornithology predominating.

== Awards ==
In 1957 he was awarded the Australian Natural History Medallion.
