= Leslie Christidis =

Australian ornithologist (born 1959)

- Born: May 30, 1959 (age 67)
- Other name: Les Christidis
- Education: University of Melbourne (B.Sc.); Australian National University (Ph.D.)
- Known for: Research on evolution and systematics of birds; demonstrating Australian origin of songbirds
- Awards: W. Roy Wheeler Medallion (2005)
- Scientific career
- Fields: Ornithology
- Workplaces: Southern Cross University National Marine Science Centre; Australian Museum; Museum Victoria
- Thesis: (1985)
- Author abbrev. (zoology): Christidis

Leslie Christidis (born 30 May 1959), also simply known as Les Christidis, is an Australian ornithologist. His main research field is the evolution and systematics of birds. He has been director of Southern Cross University National Marine Science Centre since 2009. He was assistant director at Sydney's Australian Museum from 2004 to 2009.

== Career ==
Leslie Christidis graduated as Bachelor of Science at the University of Melbourne in 1980. In 1985, he earned his Ph.D. at the Australian National University, where he studied the evolutionary genetics of Australian finches.

Christidis was a postdoctoral fellow at the CSIRO Division of Wildlife and Ecology from 1985-86, studying the evolution of Australian birds. In 1987, Christidis was the recipient of Queen Elizabeth II fellowship at the Australian National University. Through this research, Christidis demonstrated that 4,500 species of the world's songbirds had their origin in Australia.

Les Christidis was Senior Curator of Ornithology at the Museum Victoria from 1987 to 1996. From 1997 to 2004, Christidis was Head Curator and Head of Sciences, developing exhibits in the Melbourne Museum, ScienceWorks, and Melbourne Planetarium. From 2004 to 2009, Christidis was the Assistant Director, Research and Collections at the Australian Museum.

Les Christidis is the author or co-author of over 100 scientific papers and books on the taxonomy and evolutionary genetics of birds, bats, marsupials, bryozoans and more recently on cultural intangible heritage. Together with Walter E. Boles he published The Taxonomy and Species of Birds of Australia and Its Territories in 1994, with several revisions on Australasian birds including the family Acanthizidae. Together with Richard Schodde he described Amytornis barbatus diamantina, a subspecies of the grey grasswren, in 1987. He further described two subfamilies, Amalocichlinae and Pachycephalopsinae, and a genus, Cryptomicroeca in 2012.

He was awarded the W. Roy Wheeler Medallion in 2005.

Christidis is currently serving as the Pro Vice Chancellor (Research and Infrastructure) and Dean, Research Infrastructure and Operations in the office of the Deputy Vice-Chancellor (Research) at Southern Cross University.

== Selected works ==
- Les Christidis, Walter Boles: The Taxonomy and Species of Birds of Australia and Its Territories. Royal Australasian Ornithologists Union, 1994. ISBN 978-1-875122-06-6
- Les Christidis, Walter Boles: Systematics and Taxonomy of Australian Birds. CSIRO Publishing. 2008. ISBN 978-0-643-06511-6
