= Jeremy Boot =

Australian wildlife artist (born 1948)

Jeremy Boot (born 1948) is a South Australian wildlife artist, known particularly for detailed, ornithologically accurate, portraits of birds.

Boot was born in Java and arrived in Australia in 1949. He is a self-taught artist

His work has been reproduced a great number of times on playing cards, calendars, notepads, china plates and other high quality media, including limited edition art prints.

== Publications ==
- W. Roy Wheeler (1980). The Birds of Victoria and Where to Find Them. illustrated by Jeremy Boot. Nelson. pp. 173pp. ISBN 9780170053228.
- Richard Schodde; Ian J. Mason (1982). Nocturnal Birds of Australia. illustrated by Jeremy Boot. Nelson. pp. 136pp.
- Shane Parker (1985). Birds of South Australia. illustrated by Jeremy Boot. pp. 56pp. ISBN 0958961905. foreword by Sir Mark Oliphant.
- Jeremy Boot (2011). The Art Of Jeremy Boot — A Collection of Twenty Eight Colour Paintings. ISBN 0646560573. also marketed as Birds of Australia
