= Peter Menkhorst =

Australian ecologist

- Education: BSc Monash University, Melbourne, Australia
- Occupation: Ecologist
- Organization: Victorian Government
- Notable work: Mammals of Victoria: distribution, ecology, conservation. Field Guide to the Mammals of Australia. The Australian Bird Guide

Peter Menkhorst PSM is an Australian ecologist and an authority on Australian mammals and birds. He is experienced in wildlife management, including management of over-abundant Koalas, and in threatened species recovery; he has developed recovery plans and led recovery teams for a number of species including the Orange-bellied Parrot; Helmeted Honeyeater, regent honeyeater, Mountain Pygmy Possum and Brush-tailed Rock Wallaby. Menkhorst is also a natural history author and recently co-authored The Australian Bird Guide.

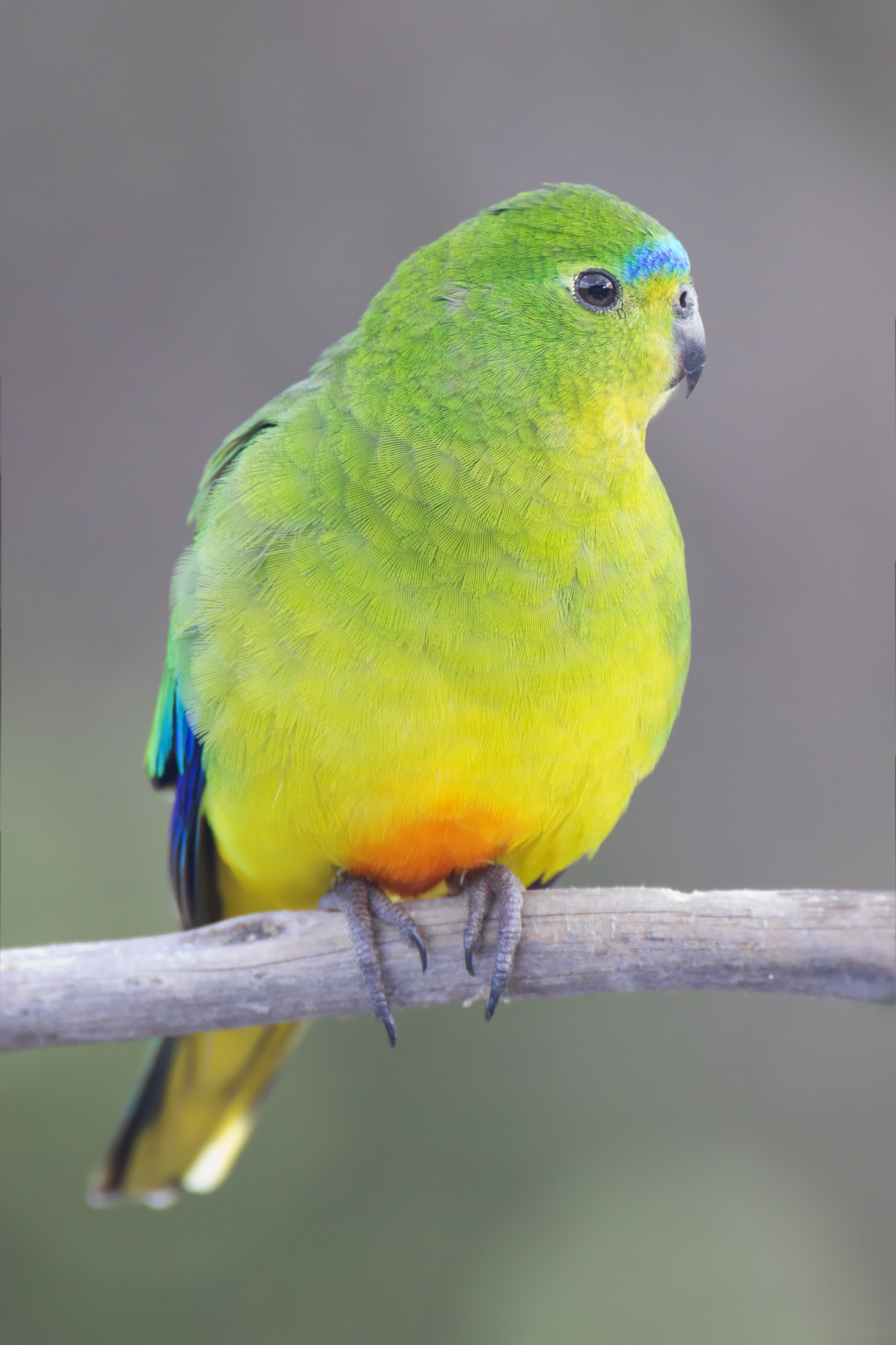
Orange-bellied Parrot

== Career ==
Menkhorst graduated in 1973 with a Bachelor of Science from Monash University majoring in Botany and Zoology. He has over 40 years experience in fauna survey and ecological research conducted for the Department of Environment, Land, Water and Planning and its predecessors. In 2018 he was a program leader in the Community Ecology Section at the Arthur Rylah Institute for Environmental Research, leading the Waterbird and Wetland Program.

The Waterbird and Wetland program is collecting and analysing long time-series of data from natural and artificial wetlands across Victoria including Western Port, Port Phillip, Western Treatment Plant and Murray Valley to understand the impact of weather patterns and management of land and water on bird populations. The aim is to understand these systems and in doing so help improve conservation outcomes. The team also assists in the management of Duck Hunting in Victoria

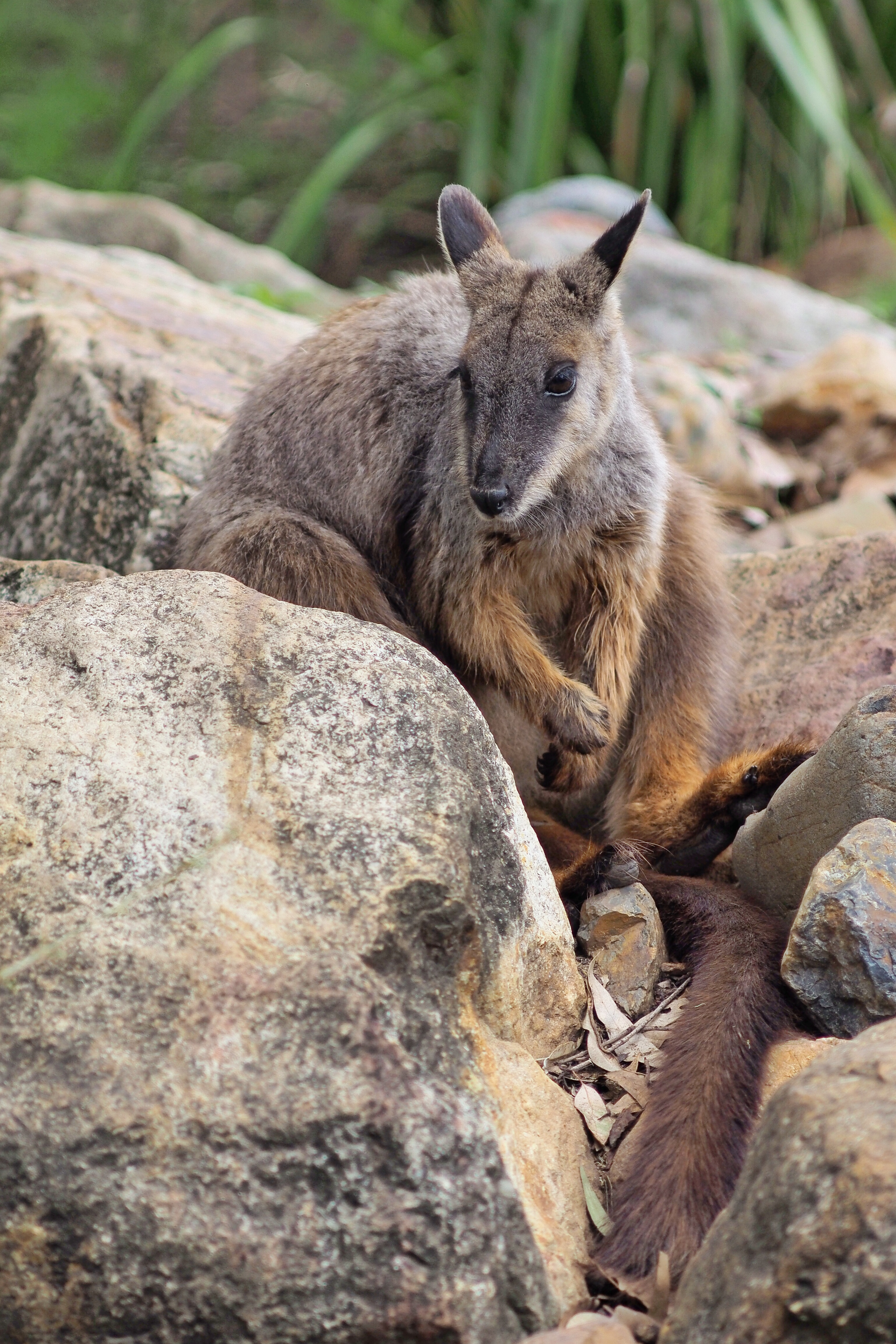
Brush-tailed Rock Wallaby

== Publications ==
Menkhorst has authored or co-authored field guides to both the birds and the mammals of Australia and has written many scientific papers and unpublished reports - see Google Scholar or Research Gate.

Books by Peter Menkhorst Include:

- Mammals of Victoria : Ecology, Distribution and Conservation
- Field Guide to Mammals of Australia
- The Australian Bird Guide

Menkhorst has also reviewed numerous books for Australian Book Review. Titles reviewed include: Sentinel Chicken by Nobel Laureate Peter Doherty, Where Songs Began by Tim Low and Platypus by Ann Moyal.

== Awards ==
- 1998 Australian Natural History Medallion
- 2017 Whitley Medal - Royal Zoological Society of NSW
- 2019 Australian Honours List Public Service Medal
