= Stanley Robert Mitchell =

Australian metallurgist, mineralogist and ethnologist (1881–1963)

Stanley Robert Mitchell (12 February 1881 – 22 March 1963) was an Australian commercial metallurgist as well as an amateur mineralogist and ethnologist.

== Early years ==
Mitchell was born in St Kilda, Victoria, the oldest of eight siblings. His father, James Mitchell, was a commercial traveller and amateur mineralogist. He was educated at Armadale State School. From 1898 he was employed as a metallurgist and industrial chemist in a Footscray smelting works.

== Career ==
Mitchell studied in the evenings at the Working Men's College of Melbourne; he gained a certificate in geology in 1911 and subsequently worked for the Department of Metallurgical Geology and Mineralogy. He established his own businesses, first as a gold assayer, then as S. R. Mitchell & Co., which was a refiner of precious metals from the 1920s, then Mitchell's Abrasives in 1930 to manufacture sandpaper. He also worked as a consultant to mining ventures and was a member of Australasian Institute of Mining and Metallurgy and a foundation member of the Royal Australian Chemical Institute.

Mitchell was a strong supporter for regional field naturalist clubs, becoming a founder and patron of the Peninsula Field Naturalists' Club in 1952. He would go on to attend and present at club meetings and would regularly contribute to the club newsletter.

== Private life ==
In 1906 Mitchell married Beatrice Anna Pay, a music teacher, with whom he was to have two sons and two daughters. He was widowed in 1922 and married Ila Victoria Davies in 1924, with whom he had a son and from whom he was divorced in 1946. In 1946 he married Bessie Alice Annie Terry, who survived him. His three sons all joined the family business.

Mitchell accumulated major collections of rocks, minerals and Aboriginal artefacts and was heavily involved in the activities of field naturalists’ clubs. He wrote numerous articles and a book about his interests.

== Honours and awards ==
- Honorary Mineralogist, National Museum of Victoria (1931–1963)
- Founder (1934) and President (1940, 1942-43) of the Anthropological Society of Victoria
- President, Field Naturalists Club of Victoria (1936–1937)
- Trustee and Treasurer, National Museum of Victoria (1945–1954)
- Honorary Ethnologist, National Museum of Victoria (1949–1963)
- Australian Natural History Medallion (1955)

== Publications ==
- Mitchell, S.R. (1949). Stone-age Craftsmen. Stone tools and camping places of the Australian Aborigines. Tait: Melbourne.
