= Jean Galbraith =

Australian botanist and writer (1906–1999)

- Born: 28 March 1906; Tyers, Gippsland, Victoria, Australia
- Died: 2 January 1999; Ringwood, Victoria, Australia
- Occupations: Botanist; Gardener; Writer; Poet
- Writing career
- Years active: 1920s–1990s
- Genres: Children's literature Botany; Gardening; Poetry
- Subjects: Australian native plants, conservation, natural history
- Notable works: Garden in a Valley; Wildflowers of Victoria; Grandma Honeypot
- Notable awards: Australian Natural History Medallion (1970)

Jean Galbraith (28 March 1906 – 2 January 1999) was an Australian botanist, gardener, writer of children's books and poet.

Galbraith was born at Tyers, Gippsland, where she lived for her whole life. The family's sprawling native garden at their cottage "Dunedin" formed the backdrop to her first articles on growing native flowers. As a teenager, Galbraith joined the Field Naturalist Club and began to train herself in botany. Despite her lack of formal qualifications, Galbraith became a highly respected botanist. She was counted an "important and influential woman gardener", and "natural successor" to Edna Walling.

Galbraith used the pseudonym "Correa" for her early works. She first started writing at the age of 19, and was widely published from the age of 26. For 50 years she contributed monthly to two magazines, The Garden Lover and The Victorian Naturalist, as well as occasional articles for The Age. Galbraith collected some of her Garden Lover articles and published them in 1939 as Garden in a Valley.

Galbraith collected thousands of specimens for the National Herbarium of Victoria. The species Prostanthera galbraithiae was named for Galbraith as co-discover of the species and advocate for its protection. In 1936 she donated the first wildflower sanctuary in Victoria, established by the Native Plants Preservation Society of Victoria at Tyers, near Traralgon in Victoria's Latrobe Valley. She was recipient of the 1970 Australian Natural History Medallion and founding member of the Latrobe Valley Field Naturalists Club.

In addition to poetry Galbraith also wrote the lyrics for hymns, such as "O Christ our Lord whose beauty". "She held a deep Christian (Christadelphian) faith which sustained her at all times".

In 1993, rare aniseed boronia, Boronia galbraithiae was named in her honour.

Galbraith died in Ringwood, Victoria, in 1999.

== Works ==
In all Galbraith wrote ten books:

Botany and gardening:

- Wildflowers of Victoria, 1967
- Collins field guide to the wild flowers of south-east Australia, including temperate regions of N.S.W, Victoria, Tasmania, South Australia and Queensland 1977
- A gardener's year, 1987
- A garden lover's journal (1943–1946), 1989
- Wildflower diary, Winifred Waddell, Jean Galbraith, Elizabeth Cochrane, 1976
- Fruits, Jean Galbraith, John Truscott, 1966

Books for children:

- Grandma Honeypot, 1963
- The wonderful butterfly; the magic of growth in nature, 1968
- From flower to fruit, Jean Galbraith, Moira Pye, 1965

Autobiography:

- Garden in a valley, Jean Galbraith – Biography and autobiography, 1985
- Doongalla restored: the story of a garden, 1991, 123pp (First published in The Australian Garden Lover' between 1939 and 1941 under the title Two and a Garden)
- Kindred spirits: a botanical correspondence, Anne Latreille, Jean Galbraith, Australian Garden History Society, 1999

Poetry:

- Poems for Peter, (ISBN 81-87409-01-0)

She also wrote regularly for the NSW School Magazine, ran a series of broadcasts on the ABC for children, and in 1964 and 1965, contributed a monthly page for the Educational Magazine called "Beauty in Distress – a plea for the preservation of our native plants".
