= Austral Ecology =

Peer-reviewed scientific journal

- Discipline: Ecology
- Language: English
- Edited by: Rafael D. Zenni

Publication details
- Former name: Australian Journal of Ecology
- History: 1976–present
- Publisher: Wiley
- Frequency: Continuous publication with monthly issues
- Open access: Hybrid
- Impact factor: 1.6 (2025)

Standard abbreviations
- ISO 4: Austral Ecol.

Indexing
- ISSN: 1442-9985 (print); 1442-9993 (web)
- LCCN: 00252609
- OCLC no.: 928324250

Links
- Journal homepage

Austral Ecology: A Journal of Ecology in the Southern Hemisphere is a peer-reviewed scientific journal covering fundamental and applied ecology in terrestrial, marine, and freshwater systems, with a particular focus on the Southern Hemisphere. It publishes experimental, observational and theoretical research, including studies of ecological processes shared among regions. The journal is published by Wiley and is an official journal of the Ecological Society of Australia.

Established in 1976 as Australian Journal of Ecology, it adopted its current name in 2000. Its editor-in-chief is Rafael D. Zenni (Federal University of Lavras, Minas Gerais, Brazil).

== Manuscript types ==
The journal publishes the following article types:

- Research Article
- Review Article
- Research Note
- Invited Review
- Perspective
- Ecological Toolkit
- Natural History Note
- Hot Topics

== Editors-in-chief ==
The following persons are or have been editor-in-chief of the journal:

- D. J. Anderson (1976–1978)
- R. L. Kitching (1979–1981)
- I. R. Noble (1982–1984)
- A. Butler, H. Heatwole, R. J. Whelan (1985–1987)
- M. Bull, D. O'Dowd, R. J. Whelan (1988–1989)
- M. Bull, P. Fairweather, D. O'Dowd (1990–1992)
- D. Ayre, M. Bull, J. Ludwig (1993)
- M. Bull, P. Fairweather, J. Ludwig (1994–1995)
- P. Fairweather, J. Ludwig, S. McIntyre (1996)
- M. Bull, J. Landsberg, S. McIntyre (1997)
- M. Bull (1998–2017)
- N. R. Andrew (2018–2025)
- R. D. Zenni (2026 - Present)

== Abstracting and indexing ==
The journal is abstracted and indexed in:

- AGRICOLA
- Biological Abstracts
- BIOSIS Previews
- CAB Abstracts
- Current Contents/Agriculture, Biology & Environmental Sciences
- EBSCO databases
- GEOBASE
- ProQuest databases
- Science Citation Index
- The Zoological Record

According to the Journal Citation Reports, the journal has a 2025 impact factor of 1.6 and CiteScore of 3.3.
