= Australian Field Ornithology =

Peer-reviewed ornithological journal

- Discipline: Ornithology
- Language: English
- Edited by: James Fitzsimons

Publication details
- Former name(s): Australian Bird Watcher
- History: 1959–present
- Publisher: BirdLife Australia

Standard abbreviations
- ISO 4: Aust. Field Ornithol.

Indexing
- ISSN: 1448-0107 (print); 2206-3447 (web)

Links
- Journal homepage; Online access; Online archive

Australian Field Ornithology is an online peer-reviewed ornithological journal published by BirdLife Australia. It covers topics relating to Australasian birds, including behaviour and ecology, with an emphasis on observations and data gained in the field.

== History ==
Originally published by the Bird Observers Club of Australia (BOCA), it was first named the Australian Bird Watcher, with the name changed in 2003. Following the merger between BOCA and Birds Australia at the beginning of 2012, it has continued to be published by the merged organisation. The founding editor-in-chief from 1959 to 1976 was Roy Percy Cooper. As of 2017 the editor is James Fitzsimons. The journal moved to an online-only format in 2016.
