= John Roslyn Garnet =

John Roslyn (Ros) Garnet (1906–1998) was an Australian biochemist and naturalist with a strong interest in nature conservation.

== Life ==
Garnet began his career in the Commonwealth Health Department Laboratory at Port Pirie, where he worked from 1928 to 1930. However, for most of his career (1930 – 1971) he was based at the Commonwealth Serum Laboratories in Parkville, Melbourne. Garnet was active in the conservation movement and was a founder of the Victorian National Parks Association in 1952, as well as serving as its Honorary Secretary for 21 years. He had a particular interest in Wilsons Promontory National Park.

== Honours and awards ==
- Australian Natural History Medallion (1966)
- Member of the Order of Australia (AM) (1982)

== Publications ==
- Garnet, J. Ros. (1965). The Vegetation of Wyperfeld National Park (North-West Victoria). A survey of its Vegetation and Plant Communities, together with a Check-list of the Vascular Flora as at December 1964.. Field Naturalists’ Club of Victoria.
- Garnet, J. Ros. (1966). Spider, Insect and Man. Commonwealth Serum Laboratories: Parkville.
- Garnet, J. Ros. (Editor). (1968). Venomous Australian Animals Dangerous to Man. Commonwealth Serum Laboratories: Parkville.
- Garnet, J. Ros. (1970). Wilson's Promontory. OUP: London.
- Garnet, J. Ros. (1971). The Wildflowers of Wilson's Promontory National Park. Lothian Books: Melbourne.
- Garnet, J. Ros.; & Conabere, Elizabeth. (1987). Wildflowers of South-Eastern Australia. Greenhouse Publications: Melbourne.
