= Australian Entomologist =

- Discipline: Entomology
- Language: English
- Edited by: Greg Daniels

Publication details
- Former name: The Australian Entomological Magazine
- History: 1974–present
- Publisher: Entomological Society of Queensland (Australia)
- Frequency: Quarterly

Standard abbreviations
- ISO 4: Aust. Entomol.

Indexing
- ISSN: 1320-6133
- OCLC no.: 28537951

Links
- Journal homepage

The Australian Entomologist is a peer-reviewed scientific journal published quarterly by the Entomological Society of Queensland. The editor in chief is Greg Daniels. It was established in 1974 as The Australian Entomological Magazine and obtained its current title in 1993.

== See also ==
- Australian Journal of Entomology
