= Whitley Awards (Australia) =

Australian science award

The Whitley Awards have been awarded annually since 1979 by the Royal Zoological Society of New South Wales (RZSNSW). They commemorate Gilbert Whitley, an eminent Australian ichthyologist, and are presented for outstanding publications, either printed or electronic, that contain new information about the fauna of the Australasian region.

For a publication to receive a Whitley Award it must either make a significant contribution of new information, present a new synthesis of existing information, or present existing information in a more acceptable form. All texts must contain a significant proportion of information that relates directly to Australasian zoology. Moreover, all submissions must have been published within 18 months of the awards entry date.

A presentation ceremony is held each year in September at the Australian Museum in Sydney when the authors and publishers of the winning titles receive their awards.

== Awards ==
Certificates of Commendation may be awarded to publications judged as the best in various categories including, but not limited to, illustrated publications, textbooks, field guides, reference works, historical zoology, periodicals, handbooks, children’s publications, CD-ROMs, limited editions and videos.

=== Whitley Medal ===
The Whitley Medal may be awarded to a publication deemed to be of superior quality that makes a landmark contribution to the understanding, content or dissemination of zoological knowledge. The Whitley Medal is the top award in zoological publishing in Australia and is not necessarily awarded every year, though sometimes more than one medal may be awarded.

Whitley Medal Winners: 2000 to 2024
Year	Title	Author	Publisher
2024	Mammals of the South-west Pacific	Tyrone Lavery and Tim Flannery	CSIRO Publishing
2023	Prehistoric Australasia	Michael Archer, Suzanne Hand, John Long, Trevor Worthy and Peter Schouten (illustrator)	CSIRO Publishing
2022	Australian Deserts: Ecology and Landscapes	Steve Morton	CSIRO Publishing
2020	Hawkmoths of Australia: Identification, Biology and Distribution	Maxwell Moulds, James Tuttle and David Lane	CSIRO Publishing
2019	Zobi and the Zoox: A Story of Coral Bleaching	Ailsa Wild, Aviva Reed, Briony Barr & Gregory Crocetti	CSIRO Publishing
2018	Australian Echinoderms: Biology, Ecology and Evolution	Maria Byrne & Timothy O’Hara	CSIRO Publishing
2017	The Australian Bird Guide	Peter Menkhorst, Danny Rogers, Rohan Clarke, Jeff Davies, Peter Marsack & Kim Franklin	CSIRO Publishing
2016	Handbook of the Mammals of the World - Volume 5 Monotremes and Marsupials; The Fishes of New Zealand Volumes 1-4	Don E. Wilson and Russell Mittermeier (editors); Clive Roberts, Andrew Stewart and Carl Struthers (editors)	Lynx Edicions; Te Papa Press
2015	Biology and Evolution of Crocodylians	Gordon Grigg, David Kirshner	CSIRO Publishing
2014	Tadpoles and Frogs of Australia	Marion Anstis	New Holland Publishers
2013	Field Guide to the Dragonflies of New Guinea / Buku Panduan Lapangan Capung Jarum untuk Wilayah New Guinea (Brachytron vol. 16)	Vincent Kalkman, Albert Orr	Nederlandse Vereniging voor Libellenstudie
2013	Ecology of Australian Freshwater Fishes	Paul Humphries, Keith Walker (editors)	CSIRO Publishing
2012	No medal awarded		
2011	Australian Land Snails Volume 1: A Field Guide to Eastern Australian Species	John Stanisic, Michael Shea, Darryl Potter, Owen Giffiths	Bioculture Press
2010	A Guide to the Beetles of Australia	George Hangay, Paul Zborowski	CSIRO Publishing
2009	Boom & Bust: Bird Stories for a Dry Country	Libby Robin, Robert Heinsohn, Leo Joseph (editors)	CSIRO Publishing
2008	A Fragile Balance: The Extraordinary Story of Australian Marsupials	Christopher Dickman, Rosemary Woodford Ganf (illustrator)	Craftsman House
2007	Australia’s Mammal Extinctions: A 50,000 Year History	Chris Johnson	Cambridge University Press
2006	Adelaide: Nature of a City - The Ecology of a Dynamic City From 1836 to 2036	Christopher Daniels, Catherine Tait (editors)	Biocity
2005	Life of Marsupials	Hugh Tyndale-Biscoe	CSIRO Publishing
2005	Freshwater Fishes of North-Eastern Australia	Brad Pusey, Mark Kennard, Angela Arthington	CSIRO Publishing
2004	Australian Mammals: Biology and Captive Management	Stephen Jackson	CSIRO Publishing
2004	Magnificent Mihirungs: The Colossal Flightless Birds of the Australian Dreamtime	Peter Murray, Patricia Vickers-Rich	Indiana University Press
2004	Beneath Southern Seas: Sharks, Rays, Seahorses & Other Fishes of Australia's Unique Coast [videorecording]	George Evatt (Director)	Coral Sea Television
2003	The Waterbug Book: A Guide to the Freshwater Macroinvertebrates of Temperate Australia	John Gooderham, Edward Tsyrlin	CSIRO Publishing
2002	Tadpoles of South-Eastern Australia: A Guide With Key	Marion Anstis	New Holland Publishers
2001	The Last Tasmanian Tiger: The History and Extinction of the Thylacine	Robert Paddle	Cambridge University Press
2001	Butterflies of Australia: Their Identification, Biology and Distribution	Michael F. Braby	CSIRO Publishing
2000	Marsupial Nutrition	Ian Hume	Cambridge University Press

== See also ==
- Whitley Awards (UK)
- List of biology awards
