= Holey Plains State Park =

Protected area in Victoria, Australia

- IUCN category II (national park)
- Location within Victoria
- Location: Victoria
- Nearest city: Rosedale
- Coordinates: 38°13′S 146°55′E
- Area: 106.38 km^{2} (41.07 sq mi)
- Established: 1977
- Governing body: Parks Victoria
- Website: Official website

Holey Plains State Park is a 10,638-hectare (26,290-acre) state park in East Gippsland, Victoria in south-eastern Australia. It is known for its exceptionally diverse flora, with about one in five plant species known in Victoria present in the park. The park is situated between Rosedale and Sale.

Prompted by lobbying from the Latrobe Valley Field Naturalists Club and a professional assessment by botanist James Hamlyn Willis, the park was identified in 1973, officially opening in 1977.

The terrain is mostly Banksia and Eucalyptus with open forest and woodlands growing on sandy ridges.
