= Sean Dooley =

Australian writer

- Occupation: Writer

Sean Dooley is an Australian writer. He has written for TV comedies including Spicks and Specks. His first published book was 2005's The Big Twitch, an account of his attempt to break the Australian record for the number of birds seen in Australia in a single year. He has written for The Guardian, the Sydney Morning Herald. and The Age. He is the editor of Australian Birdlife magazine.

== Bibliography ==
- The Big Twitch (2005)
- Anoraks to Zitting Cisticola (2007)
- Cooking with Baz (2009)
