= Australian Bird and Bat Banding Scheme =

The Australian Bird and Bat Banding Scheme (ABBBS), a combination of the former Australian bird banding and bat banding schemes, is managed by the Department of the Environment, Australia.

== History ==
The earliest banding of wild birds for scientific research in Australia began in 1912 with the banding of short-tailed shearwaters and white-faced storm-petrels by the Royal Australasian Ornithologists Union and the Bird Observers Club. Following the Second World War some state-based programs of banding short-tailed shearwaters and waterfowl began.

From about 1949 the CSIRO began banding short-tailed shearwaters (muttonbirds) in Bass Strait. This work, together with earlier banding of shearwaters, established that the birds migrate “in a long and regular cycle, spending the majority of their time in the northern Pacific and returning each year”, often to the same nesting burrow.

The organised banding of birds on a national basis started in 1953 through the CSIRO Division of Wildlife Research, with the bat banding scheme beginning in 1960. In 1984 the national coordination of banding was taken over by the Australian National Parks and Wildlife Service, a responsibility which has now been inherited by the Department of the Environment.
