= Victorian Ornithological Research Group =

The Victorian Ornithological Research Group (VORG) is a small project-focused ornithological group of amateurs and professionals based in Victoria, Australia. It was formed in 1962. It publishes a bulletin, VORG Notes. The objectives of the group are to:

- promote and encourage the study of all aspects of bird life by any means, including:
  - field studies
  - participation in the Australian Bird and Bat Banding Scheme
  - cooperation with the National Parks and Wildlife Division of the Department of Conservation and Natural Resources or its equivalent for the time being
- encourage and assist in the publication of the results of such work
- provide a meeting place for discussion groups, the reading of papers and social activities
- make provision for the retention of field records, diaries and other relevant documents
- cooperate with persons or organisations having interests similar to those of VORG
- coordinate the activities of groups engaged in work consistent with the above objects

Current projects include

- Movements of particular bird species in the suburban Melbourne, Mornington and Bellarine Peninsula Regions
- Albert Park Survey
- Penguin Study
- Short-tailed Shearwater Banding
- Flame Robin Banding
- Little Raven & Forest Raven Study
- Lorikeets of the Melbourne Region Study
