= Royal Zoological Society of New South Wales =

The Royal Zoological Society of New South Wales (RZSNSW) was formed in Sydney, New South Wales, Australia in 1879 as the New South Wales Zoological Society. A Royal Charter was granted in September, 1908, leading to a change to the current name on 10 February 1909. It publishes the scientific journal Australian Zoologist

In 1979 the Society established the annually presented Whitley Awards, the peak awards for excellence in zoological publishing relating to the fauna of the Australasian region.

== Fellowships ==
Fellows of the Royal Zoological Society of NSW have been appointed since the earliest days of the RZS in recognition of scientists who have made outstanding contributions to zoological life in Australia, either through their research or their work in promoting the aims and objective of the RZS. They are appointed only on nomination by the Council of the Royal Zoological Society of NSW and entitled to the use of the post-nominal title FRZS. As of 2015 the society had 1127 members and had elected 85 fellows since it was created.

== Publication ==
- Australian Zoologist. (Royal Zoological Society of New South Wales) ISSN 0067-2238. OCLC 1039961765.
