= Bird Observation & Conservation Australia =

Former Bird Observers Club of Australia

Bird Observation & Conservation Australia (BOCA) was a club established on 12 April 1905 by members of the Royal Australasian Ornithologists Union (RAOU) in Melbourne, Victoria, as the Bird Observers Club. Although inactive for many years, in 1927 it was revived and subsequently active until the end of 2011 when it merged with Birds Australia to form BirdLife Australia. It published a quarterly journal, Australian Field Ornithology, and a quarterly newsletter, the Bird Observer. It had a cooperative relationship with the Land for Wildlife program, a voluntary conservation scheme for private land in Victoria, which was instigated by two prominent club members, Ellen McCulloch and Reg Johnson, established in 1981, and coordinated by the Victorian Department of Sustainability and Environment.

In 1991 the club expanded its name to become the Bird Observers Club of Australia (BOCA) to give itself a national rather than a local focus. In May 2007, at the Annual General Meeting, the membership voted to change the name of the organisation again to Bird Observation & Conservation Australia to "more properly present it and the work it does", while retaining the familiar acronym BOCA. Its head office was in Nunawading (an eastern suburb of greater Melbourne) in Victoria, but it had sub-groups across eastern Australia.

By 2011 BOCA had 49 branches and affiliated groups, mainly in the eastern states of Australia, as well as a specialist group (PhotoBOCA) for those interested in bird photography. It also owned and managed the Clarkesdale Bird Sanctuary at Linton, Victoria.

== Merger ==
During 2009 discussions commenced with Birds Australia with a view to merging the two organisations. On 21 May 2011 members of both BOCA and Birds Australia voted by an overwhelming majority at their respective Annual General Meetings to merge the two organisations into one entity to be named BirdLife Australia.
