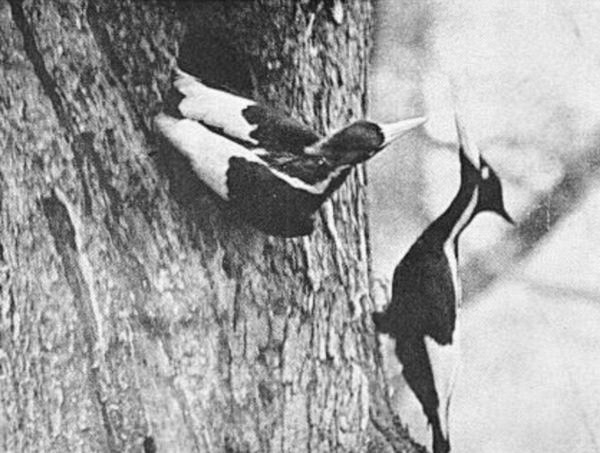
- A photograph of a male ivory-billed woodpecker leaving the nest as the female returns, taken on the Singer Tract, Louisiana, April 1935, by Arthur A. Allen

Conservation status
- Critically Endangered (IUCN 3.1)

- Presumed Extinct (NatureServe)

Scientific classification
- Kingdom: Animalia
- Phylum: Chordata
- Class: Aves
- Order: Piciformes
- Family: Picidae
- Genus: Campephilus
- Species: C. principalis

Binomial name
- Campephilus principalis (Linnaeus, 1758)

Subspecies
- C. p. principalis; C. p. bairdii
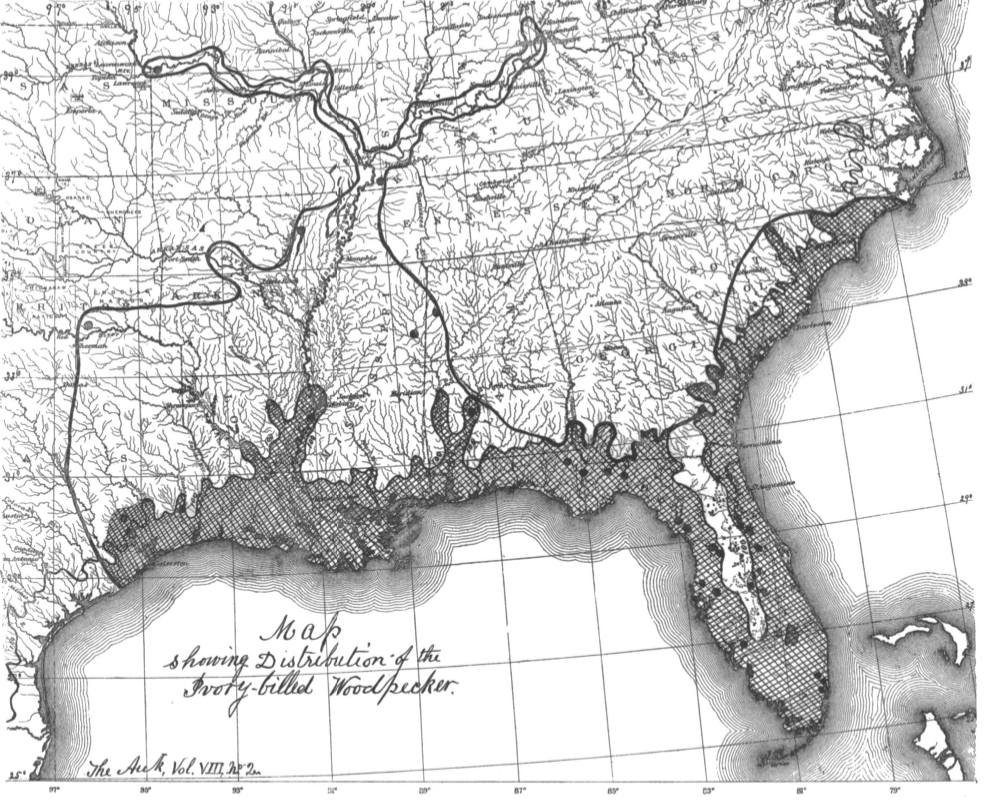
- The estimated range of the ivory-billed woodpecker prior to 1860 (solid line) and in 1891 (hatched area) – by Edwin Hasbrouck

Synonyms
- Picus principalis Linnaeus, 1758

= Ivory-billed woodpecker =

Species of bird

The ivory-billed woodpecker (Campephilus principalis) is a woodpecker native to the Southern United States and Cuba. (Note: Known in Cuban Spanish as the picamaderos picomarfil ("ivory bill woodpecker") or carpintero real ("royal carpenter/woodpecker").) Habitat destruction and hunting have reduced populations so severely that the last universally accepted sighting in the United States was in 1944, and the last universally accepted sighting in Cuba was in 1987.

The ivory-bill was the largest woodpecker in the United States, and one of the largest in the world. Naturalist John James Audubon described it as the "Great chieftain of the woodpecker tribe". In adults, the bill is ivory in color, hence the species' common name, and the plumage is deep black and white, with a red crest in males.

The bird was commonly found in bottomland hardwood forests, including dense swampland, and in temperate coniferous forests. Its diet consists of large beetle larvae, particularly wood-boring Cerambycidae beetles, supplemented by vegetable matter, including southern magnolia, pecans, acorns, hickory nuts, wild grapes, and persimmons. To hunt beetle larvae, the bird wedges bark from dead trees using its bill, exposing the larvae tunnels; within its range, the ivory-bill faces no real competitor in hunting these larvae.

In the 21st century, reported sightings and other evidence that the species persists in Arkansas, Louisiana, and Florida have been published, but the validity of these reports is disputed, with many sources arguing that it is likely extinct. Habitat protection and restoration efforts have been initiated in areas where the species might persist.

In September 2021, the U.S. Fish and Wildlife Service (USFWS) proposed that the species be declared extinct. However, following public comment periods, the USFWS issued a news release stating it would continue to analyze and review information before making a final judgment. The status of the species has not been changed as of November 2026.

== Taxonomy ==
The ivory-billed woodpecker was first described as Picus maximus rostra albo (Latin for "the largest white-bill woodpecker") in English naturalist Mark Catesby's 1731 publication of Natural History of Carolina, Florida, and the Bahamas. (Note: The universally accepted starting point of modern taxonomy for animals is set at 1758, with the publication of Linnaeus's 10th edition of Systema Naturae, although scientists had been coining names in the previous century.) Noting his report, Linnaeus later described it in the landmark 1758 10th edition of his Systema Naturae, where it was given the binomial name of Picus principalis. The genus Campephilus was introduced by the English zoologist George Robert Gray in 1840 with the ivory-billed woodpecker as the type species.

Ornithologists recognize two subspecies of this bird:

- American ivory-billed woodpecker (C. p. principalis), native to the southeastern United States
- Cuban ivory-billed woodpecker (C. p. bairdii), native to Cuba, including Isla de la Juventud

A turnaround video of a female Cuban ivory-billed woodpecker study skin RMNH 110097, Naturalis Biodiversity Center

A turnaround video of a male American ivory-billed woodpecker specimen, Naturalis Biodiversity Center

The two look similar, with the Cuban bird somewhat smaller than the American ivory-bill. In 1874, ornithologists T. M. Brewer and Robert Ridgway suggested two feather characteristics that could distinguish the birds. They wrote that the Cuban bird had white dorsal strips extending to the bill, whereas the American bird did not. The adult Cuban male's red crest feathers were longer than its black crest feathers, but were the same length in the American ivory-bill.

Some controversy exists over whether the Cuban ivory-billed woodpecker is more appropriately recognized as a separate species. A 2006 study compared DNA samples taken from specimens of both ivory-billed woodpeckers and the imperial woodpecker (Campephilus imperialis) of Mexico, a larger but otherwise very similar bird. The DNA analysis revealed that the three types of woodpeckers are genetically distinct. It also indicated that the American, Cuban, and imperial form a North American clade within Campephilus, diverging into different species in the Mid-Pleistocene.

The study does not attempt to define a lineage linking the three birds, although it does imply that the Cuban bird is more closely related to the imperial. The American Ornithologists' Union Committee on Classification and Nomenclature has said it is not yet ready to list the American and Cuban birds as separate species. A member of the committee said that more testing is needed to support that change, but concluded, "These results will likely initiate an interesting debate on how we should classify these birds."

"Ivory-billed woodpecker" is the official name given to the species by the International Ornithologists' Union. Older common names included Log Cock, Log God, Lord God Bird, Indian Hen, Kent, Kate, Poule de Bois (Wood Hen in Cajun French), and Tit-ka (Wood Cock in Seminole). In his 1942 novella, "The Bear", William Faulkner mentioned the "big woodpecker, called Lord-to-God by negroes", associating the large ivory-bill with the primeval southern environment of the old-growth forests or "Big Woods" in the Mississippi Delta. Some modern authors refer to the species as the "Holy Grail bird" or "Grail Bird" because of its extreme rarity and elusiveness to birders.

== Description ==
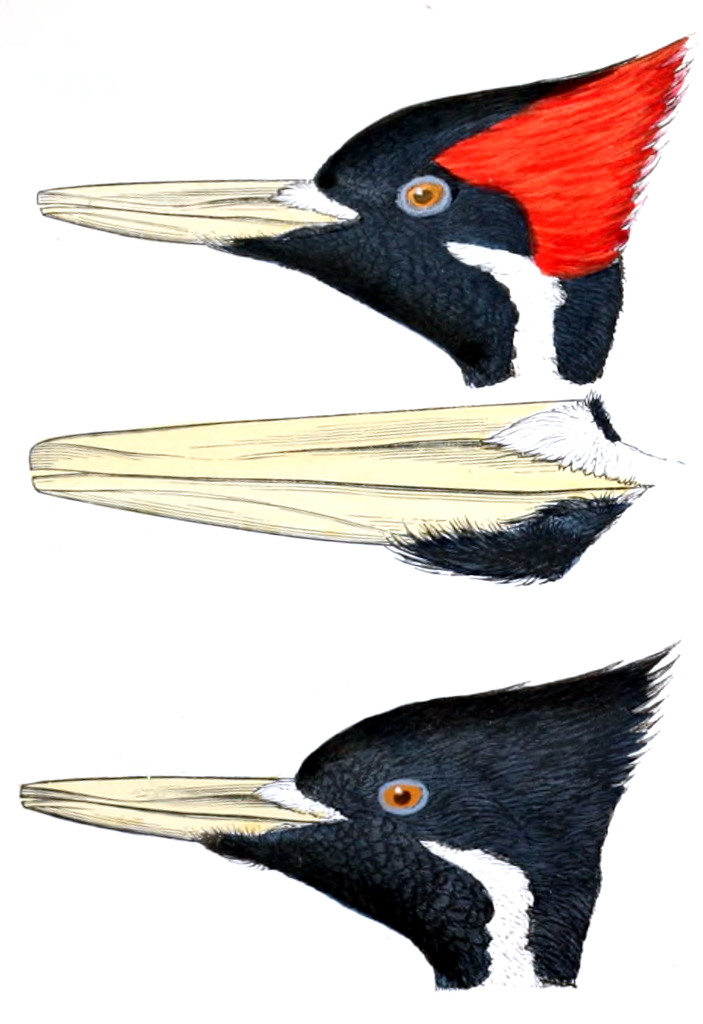
The contrast in plumage of the male (above) and female (below), separated by a detail of their bills

The ivory-billed woodpecker is one of the largest woodpeckers in the world at roughly 51 centimetres (20 in; 1.67 ft) long and 76 centimetres (30 in; 2.49 ft) in wingspan. It is the largest woodpecker in its range. The closely related imperial woodpecker (C. imperialis) of western Mexico is the largest woodpecker in the world. The ivory-billed woodpecker has a total length of 48 to 53 cm (19 to 21 in) and, based on scant information, weighs approximately 450 to 570 g (0.99 to 1.26 lb).

Its wingspan is typically 76 cm (30 in). Standard measurements obtained include a wing chord length of 23.5–26.5 cm (9.3–10.4 in), a tail length of 14–17 cm (5.5–6.7 in), a bill length of 5.8–7.3 cm (2.3–2.9 in), and a tarsus length of 4–4.6 cm (1.6–1.8 in). John James Audubon described it as the "Great chieftain of the woodpecker tribe".

The plumage of the ivory-billed woodpecker is predominated by a shiny deep black with blue or purple tint. There are white lines extending from the cheeks down the neck, meeting on the back. The ends of the inner primary feathers are white, as well as the whole of the outer secondary feathers. This creates extensive white on the trailing edge of both the upper- and underwing. The underwing also is white along its forward edge, resulting in a black line running along the middle of the underwing, expanding to more extensive black at the wingtip. Some birds have been recorded with more extensive amounts of white on the primary feathers.

Ivory-bills have a prominent crest, although it is ragged in juveniles. The bird is somewhat sexually dimorphic; the crest is black along its forward edge, changing abruptly to red on the side and rear in males but solid black in females, as well as in juvenile males. When perched with the wings folded, birds of both sexes present a large patch of white on the lower back, roughly triangular in shape.

Like all woodpeckers, the ivory-billed woodpecker has a strong, straight bill and a long, mobile, hard-tipped, barbed tongue. The bill is ivory in color in adults, while it is chalky white in juveniles. Among North American woodpeckers, the ivory-billed woodpecker is unique in having a bill whose tip is quite flattened laterally, shaped much like a beveled wood chisel. Its flight is strong and direct, and has been likened to that of a duck.

These characteristics distinguish ivory-bills from the smaller and darker-billed pileated woodpecker. The woodpecker normally is brownish-black, smoky, or slaty black. It also has a white neck stripe, but normally its back is black. Pileated woodpeckers have a red crest and a white chin. Usually, pileated woodpeckers have no white on the trailing edges of their wings and show only a small patch of white on each side of the body near the wing's edge when perched. Aberrant individual pileated woodpeckers have been reported with white trailing edges on the wings, forming a white triangular patch on the lower back when perched.

The drum of the ivory-billed woodpecker is a single or double rap. Four fairly distinct calls are reported in the literature and two were recorded in 1935. The most common, a kent or hant, is often repeated in a series and has been described as sounding like a toy trumpet. When the bird is disturbed, the pitch of the kent note rises, and the note is repeated more frequently and is often doubled. A conversational call, also recorded, is given between individuals at the nest, and has been described as kent-kent-kent.

== Habitat and diet ==
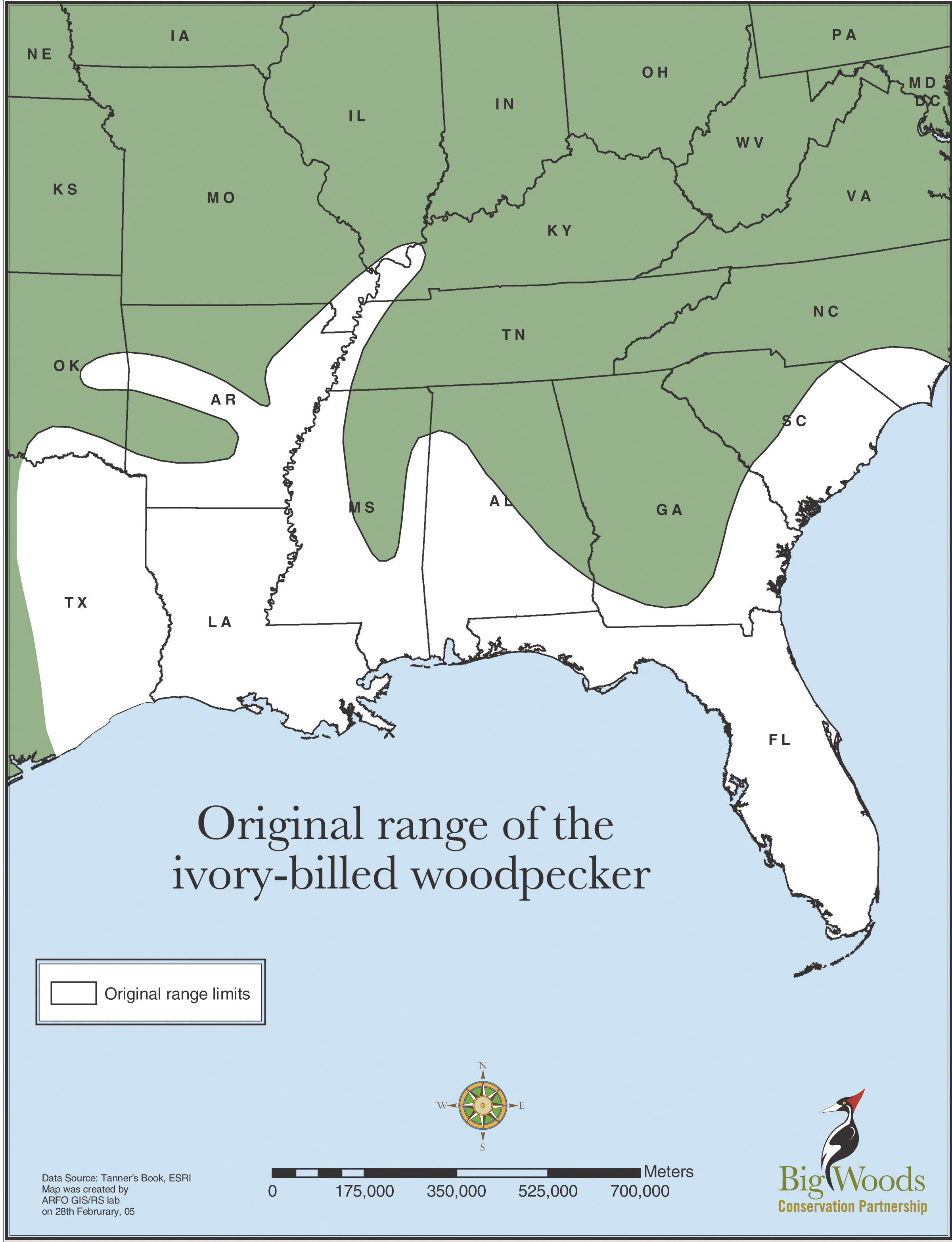
The original range of the ivory-billed woodpecker (white) in the United States (green)

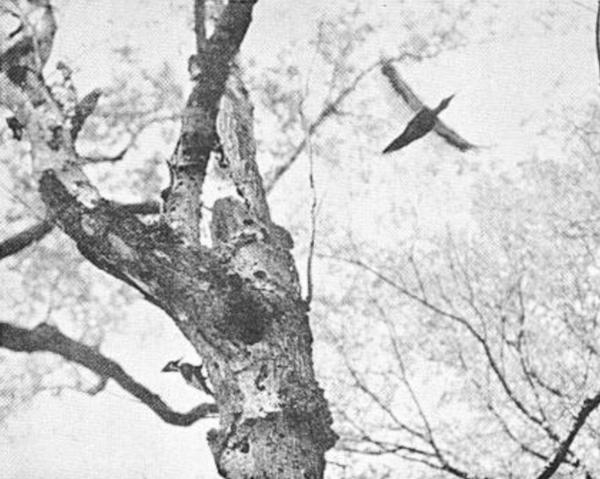
Ivory-bills exchanging places in the nest, April 1935

No attempts were made to comprehensively estimate the range of the ivory-billed woodpecker until after its range had already been severely reduced by deforestation and hunting. The first range map produced for the species was made by Edwin M. Hasbrouck in 1891. The second range map was made by James Tanner in 1942. Both authors reconstructed the original range of the species from historical records they considered reliable, in many cases from specimens with clear records of where they were obtained. The two authors produced broadly similar range estimates. They found that before deforestation and hunting began to shrink its range, the ivory-billed woodpecker had ranged from eastern Texas to North Carolina and from southern Illinois to Florida and Cuba, typically from the coast inland to where the elevation is approximately 30 m (98 ft).

However, a few significant differences exist between Hasbrouck's and Tanner's reconstructions. Based on the reports of Wells Woodbridge Cooke from Kansas City and Fayette, Hasbrouck's range map extended up the Missouri River and approximately to Kansas City, which Tanner rejected as a possible accidental or unproven report. Also, Hasbrouck's range estimate extended up the Ohio River Valley to Franklin County, Indiana, based on a record from E. T. Cox, which Tanner likewise rejected as unproven or accidental. Tanner's range estimate extended farther up the Arkansas and Canadian Rivers, based on bird sightings reported by S. W. Woodhouse west of Fort Smith, Arkansas, and by Edwin James at the falls of the Canadian River. Hasbrouck did not mention these Woodhouse and James reports of the ivory-bill; they were possibly unknown to him.

Tanner's range map is generally accepted as the original range of the bird, but a number of records exist outside of both ranges that were either overlooked or rejected by Tanner or that surfaced after his analysis. Southwest of Tanner's range estimate, the species was reported in Texas along the San Marcos and Guadalupe Rivers, near New Braunfels, and all south-central Texas, around 1900 for at least one of these Texas reports. Farther along the Ohio River Valley, William Fleming reported shooting an ivory-billed woodpecker at Logan's Fort, Kentucky, in 1780. Ivory-billed woodpecker remains were found in middens in Scioto County, Ohio, and were inferred to come from a bird locally hunted. Similar inferences were drawn from remains found near Wheeling, West Virginia. There is also a report of a bird shot and eaten in Doddridge County, West Virginia, around 1900. Based on reports that did not include specimens, Hasbrouck set the northern limit of the range along the Atlantic Coast to around Fort Macon, North Carolina. This range was rejected as unproven by Tanner, who, instead, used the record by Alexander Wilson of a bird shot 12 miles (19 km) north of Wilmington, North Carolina, to set the northern limit of the range.

Records exist of the ivory-billed woodpecker farther north along the Atlantic Coast; Thomas Jefferson included it as a bird of Virginia in Notes on the State of Virginia, listing it as the "White bill woodpecker" with the designation of Picus principalis. Audubon reported the bird could occasionally be found as far north as Maryland. In the mid-18th century, Pehr Kalm reported that it was present seasonally in Swedesboro, New Jersey.

Farther inland, Wilson reported shooting an ivory-bill west of Winchester, Virginia. Bones recovered from the Etowah Mounds in Georgia are believed to come from ivory-bills hunted locally. The ivory-billed woodpecker is not evenly distributed within its range but highly concentrated in local areas with suitable habitat and large quantities of appropriate food.

Knowledge of the ecology and behavior of ivory-billed woodpeckers is mainly derived from James Tanner's study of several birds in a tract of forest along the Tensas River in the late 1930s. The extent to which Tanner's data can be extrapolated to the species overall remains an open question. Ivory-billed woodpeckers have been found in various habitat, such as dense swamplands, relatively open old-growth forest, and the Cuban upland pine forests. However, it remains unclear whether this represents a complete list of suitable habitat.

In the Tensas River region, Tanner estimated one pair of birds per 44 km^{2} (17 mi^{2}). From historical data, he also estimated one pair of birds per 25 km^{2} (10 mi^{2}) in the California Swamp, north of current-day Suwannee Florida, and one pair per 16 km^{2} (6 mi^{2}) along the Wacissa River. Tanner concluded that these birds need large amounts of suitable territory to find enough food to feed themselves and their young. Therefore, they should be expected to occur at low densities, even in healthy populations.

After the Civil War, the timber industry deforested millions of acres in the South, leaving only sparse, isolated tracts of appropriate habitat. It became generally accepted that deforestation, coupled with the ivory-bill's requirement for a large range, was the cause of the species' population decline in the South. This picture has been disputed by Noel Snyder, who contended that hunting rather than habitat loss was the primary cause of the population decline. He argued that Tanner's population estimates were based on an already depleted population, and the bird's home range needs were significantly smaller.

The ivory-billed woodpecker prefers to eat beetle larvae, with roughly half of its recorded stomach contents consisting of large beetle larvae, particularly those from the family Cerambycidae; Scolytidae beetles have also been recorded. The bird also eats significant vegetable matter, with recorded stomach contents including pecans, acorns, hickory nuts, poison ivy seeds, and the fruit of the southern magnolia tree. They also have been observed feeding on wild grapes, persimmons, and hackberries. To hunt woodboring grubs, the bird uses its enormous bill to hammer, wedge, and peel the bark off dead trees to access their tunnels. The ivory-billed woodpecker has no real competitors in hunting these grubs, as no other bird species present in its range can remove tightly bound bark in the same manner.

Ivory-billed woodpeckers are diurnal birds, spending their nights in individual roost holes that often are reused. The birds typically leave their roost holes around dawn, feeding and engaging in other activities during the early morning. They are generally inactive during the mid-day and resume feeding activities in the late afternoon before returning to the roosts around dusk.

== Breeding biology and life cycle ==
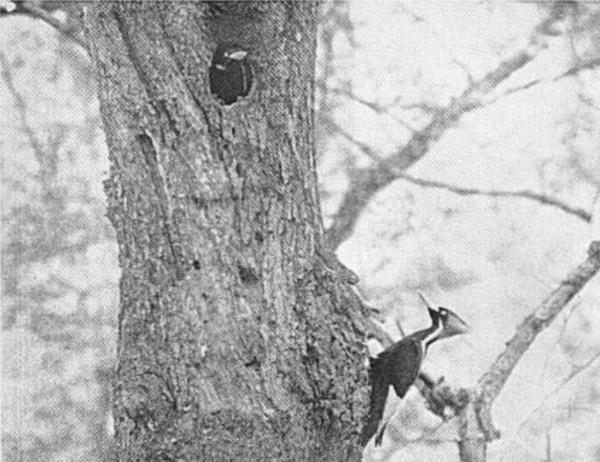
A photograph of a male ivory-bill returning to the nest in order to relieve the female, Arthur A. Allen, April 1935.

The ivory-billed woodpecker is thought to mate for life. Pairs are known to travel together. These paired birds breed every year between January and May. Both parents work together to excavate a cavity in a tree approximately 15–70 feet (4.6–21.3 m) from the ground for the nest in which their young will be raised. Limited data indicates a preference for living or partially dead trees, with rotten ones avoided. Nest cavities are typically in or just below broken-off stumps in living trees, where the wood is easier to excavate. The overhanging stump protects against rain and leaves the opening in shadow, providing some protection against predators.

No clear records indicate that ivory-bills reuse their nest cavities in subsequent years. Like most woodpeckers, they likely excavate a new nest each year. Nest openings are typically oval to rectangular, and measure approximately 12–14 cm (4.7–5.5 in) tall by 10 cm (3.9 in) wide. The typical nest depth is roughly 50 cm (20 in), with nests as shallow as 36 cm (14 in) and as deep as 150 cm (59 in).

Typically, ivory-billed woodpeckers lay eggs in April or May, with a few accounts of eggs laid as early as mid-February. A second clutch has only been observed when the first one failed. Up to three glossy, china-white eggs are laid, measuring on average 3.5 cm × 2.5 cm (1.38 in × 0.98 in), though there have been cases of clutches containing up to six eggs and broods with up to four young. Tanner estimated the incubation period to be roughly 20 days, which parallels that of the Magellanic Woodpecker. This period has not been quantified for the Ivory-bill.

Parents cooperate in incubating the eggs, with the male observed incubating overnight. During the day, the male and female typically alternate every two hours, with one foraging and the other incubating. Once the young hatch, both parents forage to bring food to them. Young learn to fly about 7 to 8 weeks after hatching. The parents continue feeding them for another two months. The family eventually splits up in late fall or early winter.

Ivory-billed woodpeckers are not migratory; historically, pairs were frequently observed nesting within a few hundred meters of previous nests, year after year. Although ivory-billed woodpeckers feed within a semiregular territory extending a few kilometers of their nest or roost, they are not territorial. There are no known records of ivory-bills protecting their territories from other ivory-bills when they encounter each other. The ivory-billed woodpecker has been observed exhibiting social behavior, with groups of four or five birds feeding together on a single tree, and as many as eleven observed feeding in the same location.

Similarly, ivory-billed woodpeckers have been observed feeding on the same tree as the pileated woodpecker, the only other large woodpecker with whom they share a range, without hostile interactions. Although not migratory, the ivory-billed woodpecker is sometimes described as nomadic. Birds relocate occasionally to areas where disasters like fires or floods have resulted in large amounts of dead wood, subsequently supporting large populations of beetle larvae, a preferred food source.

The maximum lifespan of an ivory-billed woodpecker is not known. Since other Campephilus woodpeckers typically do not live longer than 15 years, this value is sometimes used as an estimate for the ivory-bill. No species, aside from humans, are known predators of this woodpecker, yet, they have been observed to exhibit predator response behaviors toward Cooper's hawks and red-shouldered hawks. It is also possible that nest predators of nestlings and eggs (squirrels, raccoons, and rat snakes) or fledged ivory-bills (owls and hawks) contributed to the species' decline.

== Status ==
The ivory-billed woodpecker is listed as "presumed extinct" by NatureServe. The IUCN lists the species as critically endangered and describes it as possibly extinct. The United States Fish and Wildlife Service currently lists the species as endangered.

The ivory-billed woodpecker was first listed as an endangered species by USFWS on 11 March 1967. A 2019 five-year review by the Service recommended that the ivory-billed woodpecker be removed from the Endangered Species List due to extinction, and in September 2021, the USFWS proposed that the species be delisted and declared extinct. After a comment period and a public hearing, an FWS spokesperson acknowledged substantial disagreement among experts regarding the status of the species, and the agency provided additional time for public comment.

The National Audubon Society was among those asking the Service to reconsider, saying that while it takes no position on the validity of recent sightings, it believes a precautionary approach will help build public trust, allow time to further consider evidence, and not discourage continued surveys for the species. Other ornithology experts and amateur birdwatchers continued to insist that the species still exists. The Louisiana Department of Wildlife and Fisheries was among those supporting a declaration of extinction, citing a lack of conclusive evidence and a concern for the allocation of scarce resources. In October 2023, USFWS said in a news release that it would continue to analyze and review information before making any final decision.

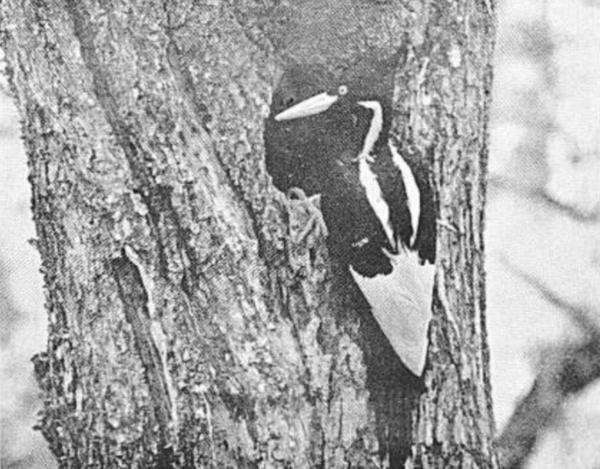
A female ivory-billed woodpecker returning to the nest, April 1935, from the Singer tract expedition of Allen, Kellogg, Tanner, and Sutton, photograph Arthur A. Allen, April 1935.

The ivory-billed woodpecker population was devastated in the late 19th century due to heavy logging activity, compounded by bird collectors hunting them. In 1907, one notable sighting occurred when President Theodore Roosevelt wrote of seeing three birds during a bear hunting trip in northeast Louisiana swampland. The species was considered extremely rare, and some ornithologists believed it was extinct by the 1920s. In 1924, Arthur Augustus Allen found a nesting pair in Florida, which local taxidermists shot for specimens.

In 1932, a Louisiana state representative, Mason Spencer of Tallulah, killed an ivory-billed woodpecker along the Tensas River and took the specimen to his state wildlife office in Baton Rouge. Consequently, Arthur Allen, along with fellow Cornell Ornithology professor Peter Paul Kellogg, Ph.D. student James Tanner, and avian artist George Miksch Sutton, organized an expedition to that part of Louisiana as part of a broader effort to record images and sounds of endangered birds across the United States. The team located a population of woodpeckers in Madison Parish in northeastern Louisiana, in a section of the old-growth forest called the Singer tract, owned by the Singer Sewing Company, where logging rights were held by the Chicago Mill and Lumber Company. The team made the only universally accepted audio and motion picture recordings of the ivory-billed woodpecker.

The National Audubon Society attempted to buy the logging rights to the tract so the habitat and birds could be preserved, but the company rejected their offer. Tanner spent 1937–1939 studying the ivory-billed woodpeckers on the Singer tract and travelling across the southern United States searching for other populations as part of his thesis work. At that time, he estimated there were 22–24 birds remaining, of which 6–8 were on the Singer tract. The last universally accepted sighting of an ivory-billed woodpecker in the United States was made on the Singer tract by Audubon Society artist Don Eckelberry in April 1944, when logging of the tract was nearly complete.

=== Evidence of persistence in the United States since 1944 ===
A comparison of the pileated woodpecker (top) with the ivory-billed woodpecker (bottom): superficial similarities of the birds result in pileated woodpeckers sometimes being mistaken for ivory-bills

Since 1944, regular reports have been made of ivory-billed woodpeckers being seen or heard across the southeastern United States, particularly in Louisiana, Florida, Texas, and South Carolina. In many instances, sightings were certainly misidentified pileated woodpeckers or red-headed woodpeckers.

Reports of hearing the kent call of the ivory-billed woodpecker have frequently been explained as misidentifications of similar calls made by other species. Blue jays, for example, occasionally produce vocalizations reminiscent of the kent call. The vocalizations of both the white-breasted and red-breasted nuthatch may also be mistaken for the distinctive kent call. Other explanations have likewise been proposed for reports of hearing the double knock of the ivory-billed woodpecker. For example, sounds resembling the double knock can be produced by wing collisions in flocks of flying ducks.

Sightings of ivory-billed woodpeckers have resulted in scientific publications, news coverage, and conservation efforts to protect the species, even though no sighting since 1944 has been universally accepted.

In 1950, the Audubon Society established a wildlife sanctuary along the Chipola River after a group led by University of Florida graduate student Whitney Eastman reported a pair of ivory-billed woodpeckers with a roost hole. The sanctuary was terminated in 1952 when the woodpeckers could not be located.

In 1967, ornithologist John Dennis, who had rediscovered the Cuban population in 1948, reported sightings of ivory-billed woodpeckers along the Neches River in Texas during an exploration sponsored by the USFWS. Dennis produced audio recording of possible kent calls that matched well with the calls of the ivory-billed woodpecker, although they also resembled calls made by blue jays. At least 20 people reported sightings of one or more ivory-billed woodpeckers in the same area in the late 1960s, and several photographs, ostensibly showing an ivory-billed woodpecker in a roost, were produced by Neil Wright. Copies of two of his photographs were given to the Academy of Natural Sciences of Drexel University. These sightings formed part of the basis for the creation of the Big Thicket National Preserve.

H. N. Agey and G. M. Heinzmann reported observing one or two ivory-billed woodpeckers in Highlands County, Florida, on 11 occasions between 1967 and 1969. During a storm, a tree where the birds had been reported roosting was damaged. This allowed Agey and Heinzmann to collect a feather from the roost, which A. Wetmore subsequently identified as an inner secondary feather of an ivory-billed woodpecker. The feather is stored at the Florida Museum of Natural History and is described as "fresh, not worn". However, since it could not be conclusively dated, it has not been universally accepted as proof that ivory-billed woodpeckers persisted to the date the feather was collected.

At the 1971 annual meeting of the American Ornithologists' Union, Louisiana State University museum director George Lowery presented two photographs showing what appeared to be a male ivory-billed woodpecker. The photographs were taken by outdoorsman Fielding Lewis in the Atchafalaya Basin of Louisiana, with an Instamatic camera. Although the photographs had the correct field markings for an ivory-billed woodpecker, their quality was not sufficient for other ornithologists to be confident that they did not depict a mounted specimen, and they were greeted with general skepticism.

In 1999, a forestry student from Louisiana State University reported an extended viewing of a pair of birds at close range in the Pearl River region of southeast Louisiana. Some experts found this sighting compelling, and in 2002, an expedition of researchers from Louisiana State University and Cornell University was sent into the area. Six researchers spent 30 days searching the area, but did not find any indications of large woodpeckers that could not be ascribed to pileated woodpeckers.

Reports of an ivory-billed woodpecker at the Cache River National Wildlife Refuge in Arkansas in 2004 resulted in a search by the Cornell Laboratory of Ornithology, led by John W. Fitzpatrick. This team reported a number of sightings of ivory-billed woodpeckers, obtained recordings of possible double-knocks and kent calls, as well as four seconds of video by David Luneau showing a large woodpecker launching from a tree and flying away. They identified it as an ivory-billed woodpecker based on its size, field marks, and flight pattern. Though the Bird Records Committee of the Arkansas Audubon Society accepted the sighting, it would not be universally recognized as legitimate. Follow-up searches conducted by the Cornell Lab of Ornithology in 2006 and 2007 did not yield more evidence of the species's presence in the refuge.

A team headed by David A. Sibley published a response arguing the bird in the video has a morphology that could be consistent with that of a pileated woodpecker, and a second team argued that flight characteristics may not be diagnostic. The original team published a rebuttal. In its Recovery Plan for the ivory-billed woodpecker, USFWS summarized its conclusion that the Luneau video shows an ivory-billed woodpecker, stating "After weighing the various positions, the FWS accepts the interpretation of Fitzpatrick et al. (2005, 2006, 2007). FWS concludes that other published interpretations by Sibley et al. (2006), and by extension Collinson (2007), are based on misinterpretations of video artifacts as plumage, and novel interpretations of typical bird flight."

Scientists from Auburn University and the University of Windsor, led by Geoffrey Hill, published a paper reporting evidence of ivory-billed woodpeckers along the Choctawhatchee River from 2005 to 2006, including sighting descriptions, audio recordings of double-knocks and kent calls, and roost cavity assessments. The Florida Ornithological Society Records Committee did not accept these sightings, stating: "Controversy surrounds the actual source of some recently made audio recordings purported to be drumming sounds and vocalizations of the Ivory-billed; recordings obtained without actually observing the source of these sounds, such as those made by the Choctawhatchee investigators, have not been proven to have been made by this woodpecker. Our Committee felt that given the lack of definitive evidence of this species' occurrence on the Choctawhatchee River, the species is best considered still extinct in Florida."

Michael Collins reported seeing and filming ivory-billed woodpeckers in the Pearl River near Stennis Space Center from 2006-2008. A paper submitted to PNAS was rejected due what the journal characterized as inadequate evidence to support "extraordinary claims". Michelle Donahue wrote in Audubon Magazine: "The clips fall short of conclusive: most of the excerpts show distant blurs that only vaguely resemble birds", and ornithologist Jerome Jackson, an expert on ivory-billed woodpeckers, said that there was no way to identify the bird that Collins saw from the video.

In response to the USFWS request for comments and evidence, long-time searcher Bobby Harrison submitted a 2020 video of a bird he identified in flight as an ivory-billed woodpecker.

In 2023 a team called Project Principalis, in partnership with the National Aviary, published trail camera photographs, sound recordings, and drone videos from a site in Louisiana, but did not claim that the evidence is definitive. Michael Collins, of the Pearl River ivory-billed woodpecker reports, said that the birds in the Project Principalis drone videos were pileated woodpeckers that had the appearance of white markings because of glare from the sun. "All of the flight characteristics are consistent with pileated woodpeckers but not ivory-billed woodpeckers," he said.

Chris Elphick, a professor of conservation biology, commented to The New York Times, "The trouble is, it's all very poor video....There are these incredibly rare birds that live in the middle of the Amazon that people can get good, identifiable photographs of, and yet people have spent hundreds of thousands of hours trying to find and photograph ivory-billed woodpeckers in the United States. If there's really a population out there, it's inconceivable to me that no one could get a good picture."

A 2024 article by Pawel Michalak pointed out inconsistencies in the video footage, such as the putative white markings changing and disappearing with the bird's movements. Michalak also performed an acoustic analysis of the sound recordings, finding them to be more similar to great horned owl vocalizations than historic ivory-billed woodpecker recordings.

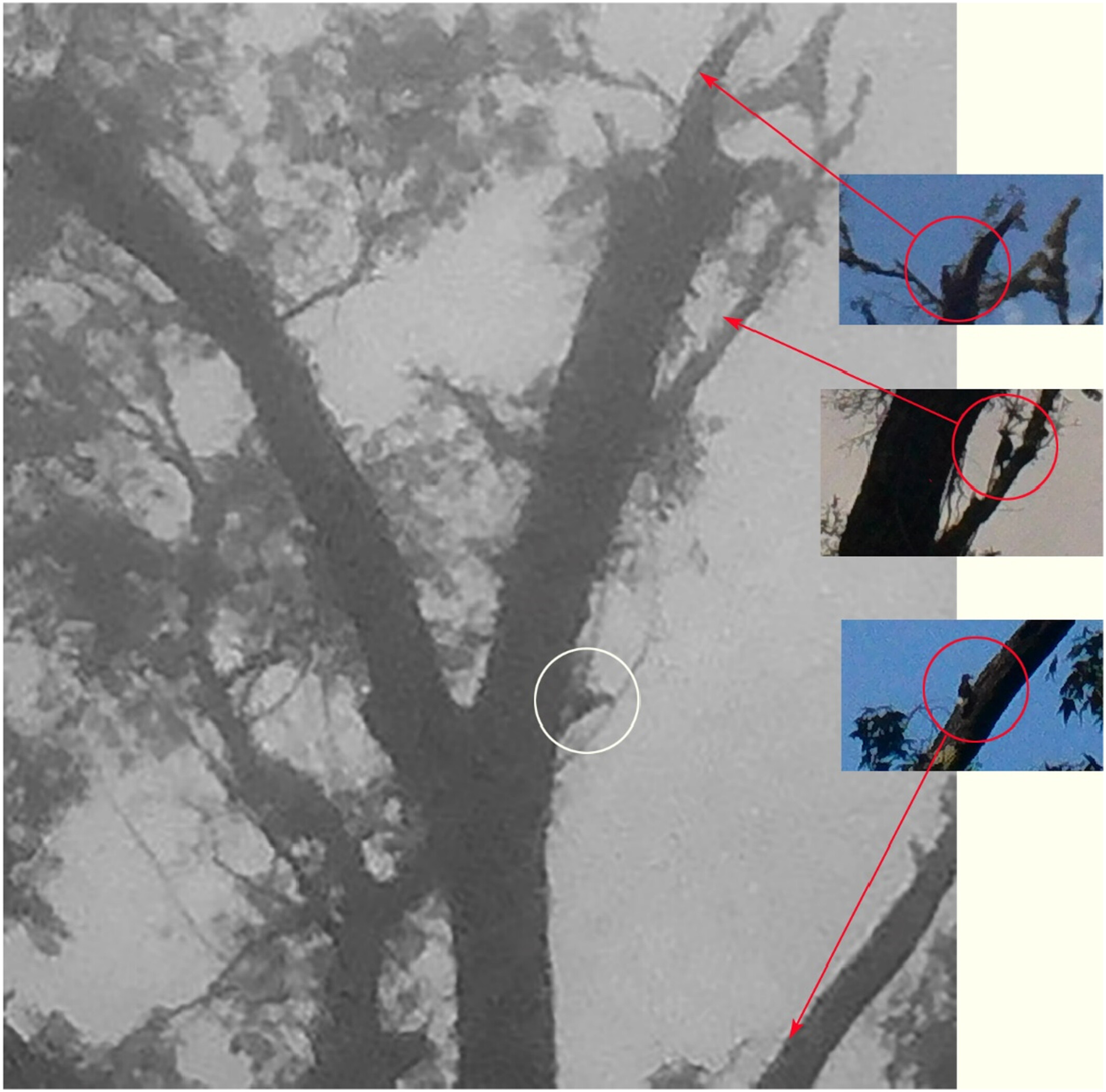
A caption from Project Principalis paper, 2023: Composite figure comparing the size of three species of woodpeckers to the apparent ivory-billed woodpecker. Inset species were photographed on the same tree, with the same camera in the same place but at different times. These three images were extracted from their original frames and placed as insets on a fourth frame that shows the presumed ivorybill on October 1, 2021. All woodpeckers here are depicted at the same scale in their original, unedited size. Arrows point to the location of where each bird was located on the tree. Insets include an unidentified small woodpecker (top), a pileated woodpecker (middle), and a red-headed woodpecker (bottom). The presumed ivory-billed woodpecker is circled in white without an arrow.

== Relationship with humans ==
The body parts of ivory-billed woodpeckers, particularly their bills, were used for trade, ceremonies, and decoration by Native American groups from the western Great Lakes and Great Plains regions. For instance, bills marked with red pigment were found among grave goods in burials at Ton won Tonga, a village of the Omaha people. The bills may have been part of "Wawaⁿ Pipes". Ivory-billed woodpecker bills and scalps were commonly incorporated into ceremonial pipes by the Iowa people, another Siouan-speaking people.

The Sauk people and Meskwaki used ivory-billed body parts in amulets, headbands, and sacred bundles. In many cases, Native Americans and others likely acquired bills through trade. For instance, Ton won Tonga was roughly 300 mi (480 km) from the farthest reported range of the ivory-billed woodpecker, yet bills were found in the graves of these people's wealthy adult men. Another bill was found in a grave in Johnstown, Colorado. The bills were quite valuable; Catesby reported a north–south trade where bills were exchanged outside the bird's range for two or three deerskins. European settlers in the United States also used ivory-billed woodpecker remains for decoration, often attaching dried heads to their shot pouches or using them as watch fobs.

The presence of remains in kitchen middens suggests that some Native American groups hunted and ate the ivory-billed woodpecker. Such remains were found in Illinois, Ohio, West Virginia, and Georgia. Hunting ivory-bills for food continued into the early 20th century in the Southeastern United States, with reports of the practice persisting until at least the 1950s. In some instances, trappers and fishermen used the flesh of ivory-billed woodpeckers as bait. In the 19th and early 20th century, hunting for bird collections was extensive, with 413 specimens housed in museum and university collections as of 2007. The 60+ skins at the Harvard Museum of Comparative Zoology is the largest collection.

The ivory-billed woodpecker has been a particular focus among birdwatchers. It has been called Audubon's favorite bird. Roger Tory Peterson called his unsuccessful search for the birds along the Congaree River in the 1930s his "most exciting bird experience". After the publication of the Fitzpatrick results, tourist attention was drawn to eastern Arkansas, with tourist spending increasing 30% in and around Brinkley, Arkansas. Brinkley hosted "The Call of the Ivory-billed Woodpecker Celebration" in February 2006. The celebration included exhibits, birding tours, educational presentations, and a vendor market. By the 21st century, the ivory-billed woodpecker had achieved a near-mythic status among birdwatchers, many of whom would regard it as a prestigious entry on their life lists.

The rare and elusive status of the species has inspired rewards for proof of persistence. In 2008, Cornell University offered a reward of $50,000 to anyone who could lead scientists to an active Ivory-billed Woodpecker roost or nest, but the offer is no longer active. In 2020, the Louisiana Wilds project offered a similar reward of $12,000 for the location of an active roost or nest.

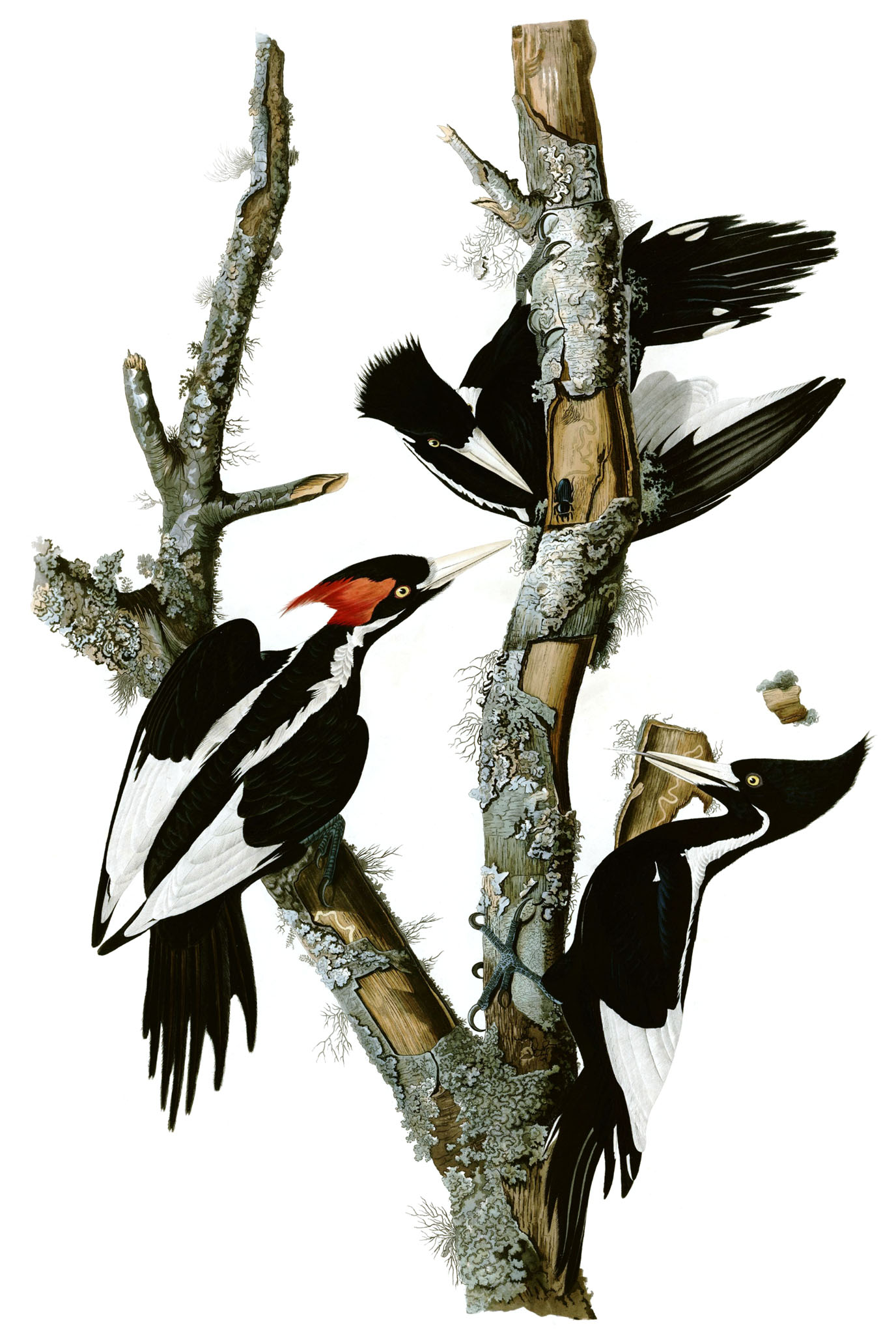
A painting by John James Audubon

The ivory-billed woodpecker has been the subject of artistic works. Joseph Bartholomew Kidd produced a painting based on Audubon's plates intended for a traveling exhibition throughout the United Kingdom and United States. The exhibition never took place and the painting is displayed in the Metropolitan Museum of Art. Based on interviews with residents of Brinkley, Arkansas, Sufjan Stevens wrote a song entitled "The Lord God Bird" about the ivory-billed woodpecker that was broadcast on National Public Radio following the public reports of sightings there.

The 2012 Alex Karpovsky film Red Flag features Karpovsky as a filmmaker on tour with his 2008 documentary film Woodpecker about the ivory-billed woodpecker. Arkansas has issued license plates featuring a graphic of an ivory-billed woodpecker.

Eudora Welty paid homage to the bird in a 1944 essay:

All vanished now from the earth—the piteous cry and all; unless where Rodney's swamps are wild enough still, perhaps it is true, the last of the ivory-billed woodpeckers still exist in the world, in this safe spot, inaccessible to man.

— "Some Notes on River Country" (1944)

== See also ==
- Bachman's warbler – Another critically endangered, possibly extinct bird native to the United States and Cuba whose continued existence is uncertain like the ivory-billed woodpecker
- Deforestation in the United States – The main factor for the ivory-billed woodpecker's decline
- Holocene extinction – Ongoing mass-extinction event primarily caused by human activity
- Imperial woodpecker – Possibly extinct relative of the ivory-billed woodpecker that is endemic to Mexico
