= American ivory-billed woodpecker =

- Turnaround video of a male American ivory-billed woodpecker specimen, Naturalis Biodiversity Center

Conservation status
- Critically Endangered (IUCN 3.1)

Scientific classification
- Kingdom: Animalia
- Phylum: Chordata
- Class: Aves
- Order: Piciformes
- Family: Picidae
- Genus: Campephilus
- Species: C. principalis
- Subspecies: C. p. principalis

Trinomial name
- Campephilus principalis principalis (Linnaeus, 1758)

Subspecies of woodpecker native to United States of America

The American ivory-billed woodpecker (Campephilus principalis principalis) is the nominate subspecies of the ivory-billed woodpecker, historically representing the largest woodpecker found north of Mexico. It serves as a stark symbol of avian grandeur and the devastating effects of rapid habitat destruction in the United States. The animal is currently categorized as Critically Endangered on the IUCN Red List but is likely to be extinct.

== Taxonomy ==
The American ivory-billed woodpecker (Campephilus principalis principalis) belongs to the order Piciformes, the family Picidae, and the genus Campephilus. The genus was first introduced by English zoologist George Robert Gray in 1840.

The species was formally described by Swedish zoologist Carl Linnaeus in 1758 within the 10th edition of his Systema Naturae, under the name Picus principalis Biodiversity Heritage Library. Linnaeus established this classification based heavily on the 1731 illustrations and field observations of English naturalist Mark Catesby Biodiversity Heritage Library.

The nominate trinomial Campephilus principalis principalis serves to explicitly distinguish this mainland United States population from its island counterpart, the Cuban ivory-billed woodpecker (Campephilus principalis bairdii). Recent mitochondrial DNA analyses published by researchers suggest that the genetic divergence between the American and Cuban lineages occurred over one million years ago during the Mid-Pleistocene, indicating they may actually be distinct species altogether National Center for Biotechnology Information.

== Appearance ==
The American subspecies are large birds that measure 19-20 in (48-51 cm) in length and 30-31 in (76-80 cm) from tip to tip of the wings. They have glossy black feathers and two prominent white lines that run down each side of the neck and meet at the base of the lower back. When folded, the wings make a large triangular white 'saddle' on the back. Early explorers such as John James Audubon recorded the bird's size and plumage in 1831 Biodiversity Heritage Library.

The bird's most defining feature is its long, straight, ivory-tinted bill, which is uniquely flattened at the tip like a beveled wood chisel. The subspecies exhibits clear sexual dimorphism via its prominent crest: adult males feature a vivid red crest along the side and rear, while females possess a solid black crest that curves slightly forward.

Compared to the Cuban subspecies, the American ivory-billed woodpecker is noticeably larger, features larger nasal tufts, and lacks the white facial stripe extending as far forward toward the bill.

== Status ==
The survival status of Campephilus principalis principalis is highly controversial and intensely debated within the ornithological community. The International Union for Conservation of Nature (IUCN) formally categorizes the species as Critically Endangered (Possibly Extinct).

The primary catalyst for its catastrophic decline was the uninhibited commercial logging of old-growth forests across the American South between 1880 and the 1940s, compounded by heavy targeting from professional specimen collectors. The last universally accepted, definitively verified sighting of a live American ivory-billed woodpecker occurred in April 1944 within a remnant stand of old-growth timber in northeastern Louisiana known as the Singer Tract, a population thoroughly documented by researcher James Tanner.

The U.S. Fish and Wildlife Service decided to propose the species for delisting in September 2021; nevertheless, the search teams failed to find conclusive evidence from their expeditions during the critical public hearings, so the bird was not taken off the Endangered Species list. Now, the subspecies is classified as Endangered in the United States under the Endangered Species Act; meanwhile, modern-day searchers are attempting to find it in the remote Louisiana swamps.

== Habitat ==
The American ivory-billed woodpecker was strictly tied to the vast, continuous bottomland hardwood forests and mature cypress swamps of the southeastern United States. The subspecies required expansive territories to survive, with biological estimates indicating that a single breeding pair needed roughly 6 square miles (15.5 square kilometers) of dense, uninterrupted primary forest to successfully forage.

Crucial to their habitat was a high density of massive, dead or dying trees. They relied on trees recently killed by natural disturbances such as storms, flooding, or fires, which attracted the specific wood-boring insects necessary for their survival.

== Behavior ==
The subspecies was a highly specialized insectivore. Using its exceptionally powerful, chisel-like bill, the bird forcefully stripped massive sheets of tightly adhered bark from recently dead trees to extract its primary food source: the large larvae of wood-boring longhorn beetles (Cerambycidae).

The annual breeding season began in December or January with intense courtship rituals, followed by cooperative nest-cavity excavation and a core egg-laying window stretching from February through May.

Unlike many other native woodpeckers that fly in a distinct undulating, wave-like pattern, the flight of the American ivory-billed woodpecker was described by historical onlookers as incredibly strong, rapid, and completely direct, frequently compared to the flight path of a duck.

The bird was most active in the early morning hours, emerging from individual roosting cavities after sunrise. It communicated through a highly unique acoustic repertoire, characterized by a nasal, trumpet-like call often transcribed as "kent," and a rapid "double-knock" display where it struck a tree trunk twice in immediate succession—a signature diagnostic sound shared by other members of the genus Campephilus.
