= Joseph Bartholomew Kidd =

Scottish painter

Joseph Bartholomew Kidd, RSA (1808–1889) was a Scottish painter.

== Life ==
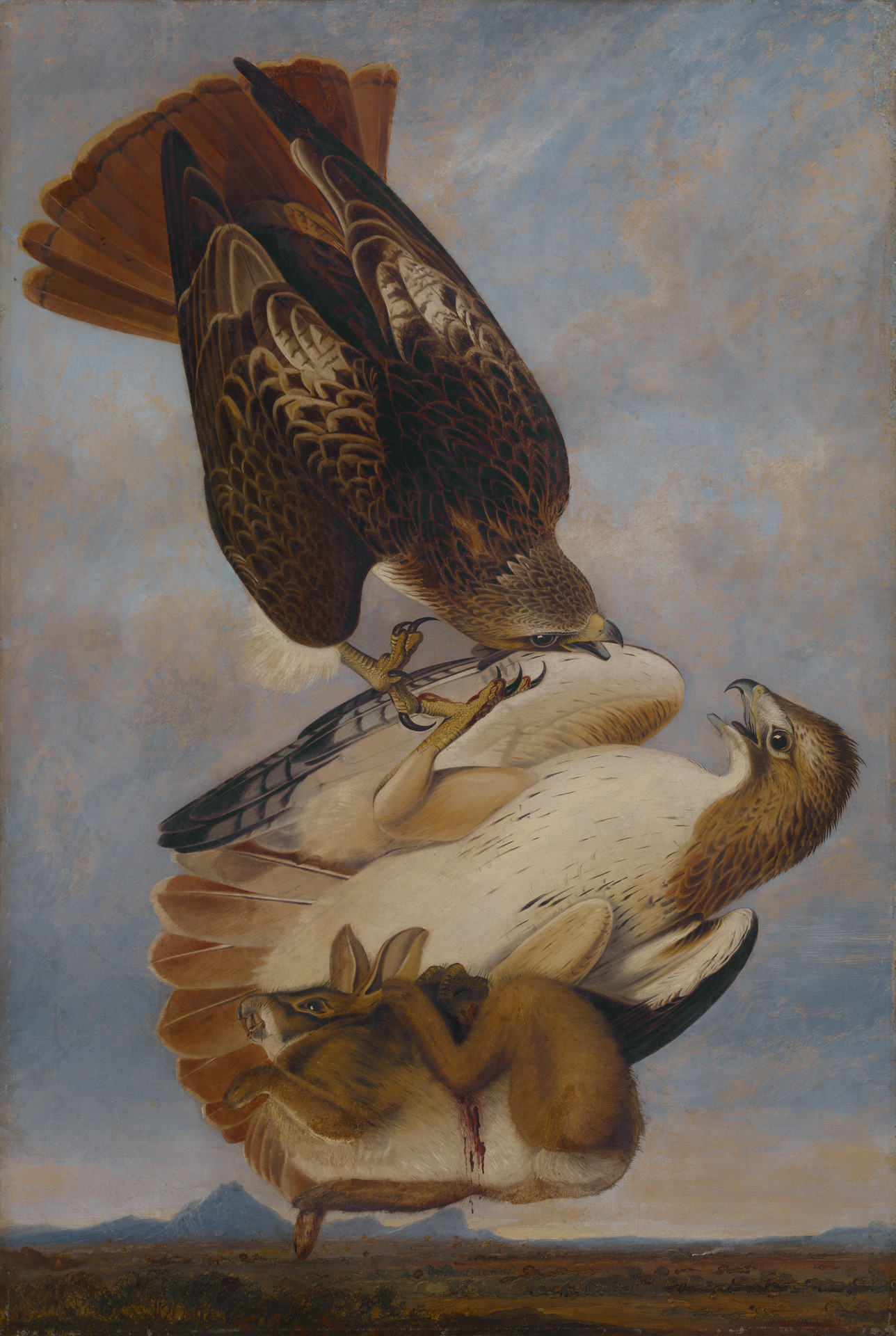
Red Tailed Hawk (c. 1831)

Joseph Bartholomew Kidd, born in 1808, perhaps at Edinburgh, was a pupil of John Thomson of Duddingston. On the foundation of the Royal Scottish Academy in 1826 Kidd was elected one of the original associates, and became a full academician in 1829.

He practised painting at Edinburgh until about 1836, when he moved to London, resigning his membership of the Royal Scottish Academy in 1838. He then settled as a teacher of drawing at Greenwich, where he resided until his death in May 1889, at the age of eighty-one. He was survived by at least one son.

=== Identity ===
He is sometimes confused with his near contemporary, the painter William Kidd, and some sources erroneously refer to him as John rather than Joseph.

== Works ==
Kidd chiefly painted the scenery of his native country, and executed a few etchings of highland views. Some of his pictures were engraved. In the 1830s, he was commissioned to copy a number of paintings of birds by the American artist and naturalist, John James Audubon. He illustrated Sir Thomas Dick Lauder's The Miscellany of Natural History (1833–4) and West Indian Scenery (1838–40). Not long before his death he painted a portrait of Queen Victoria for the Royal Hospital schools in Greenwich.

Scenes from "Tam o' Shanter"
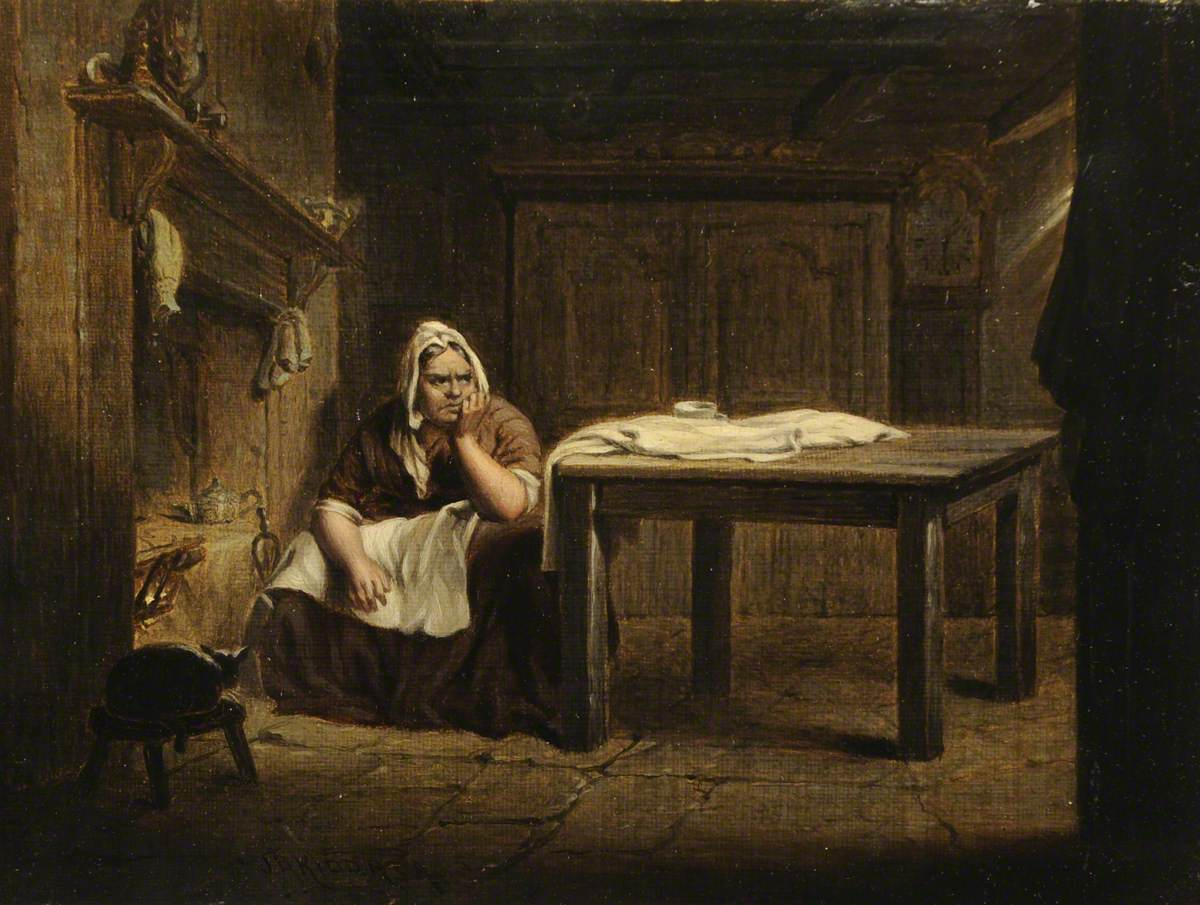
Tam's Wife Awaiting Him with Grim Expression

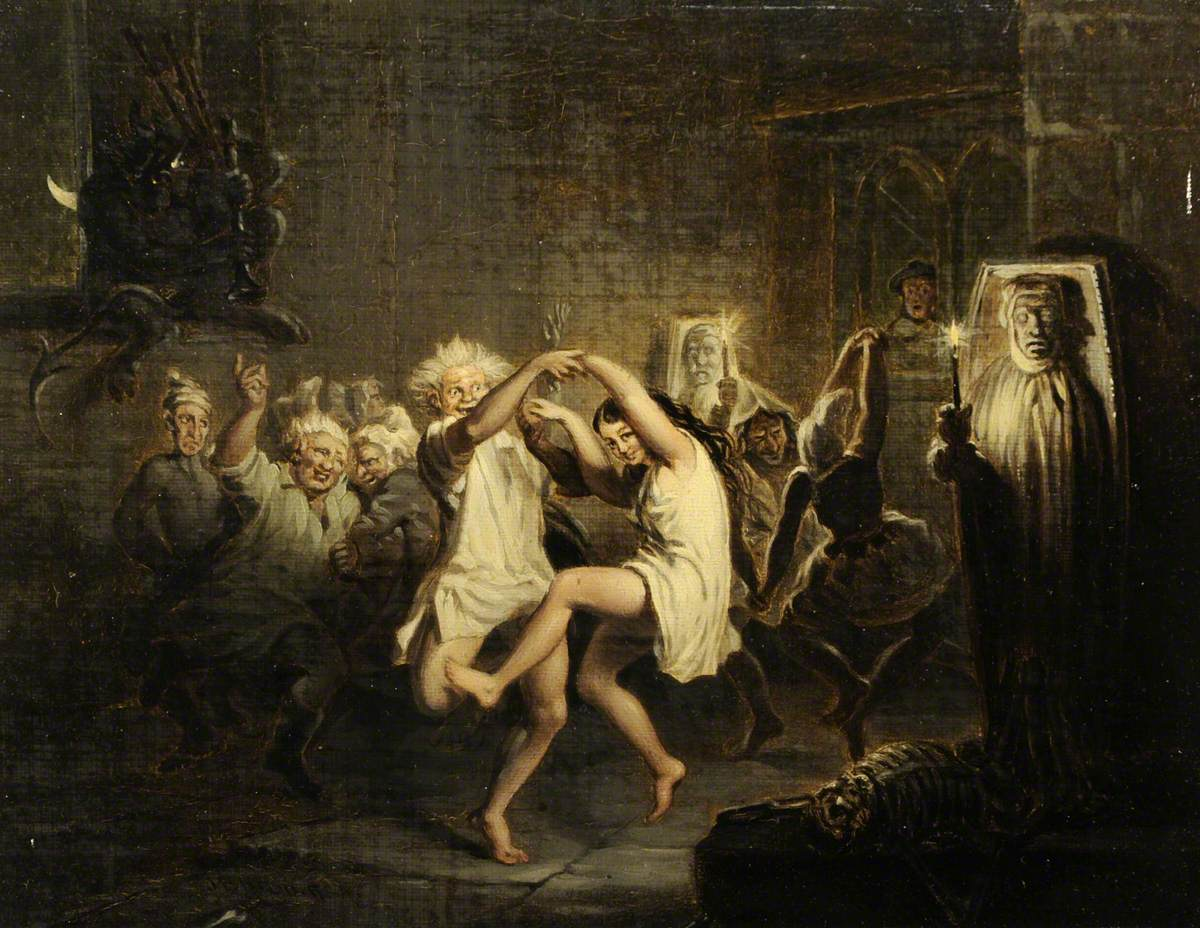
Witches Dancing in Alloway Auld Kirk

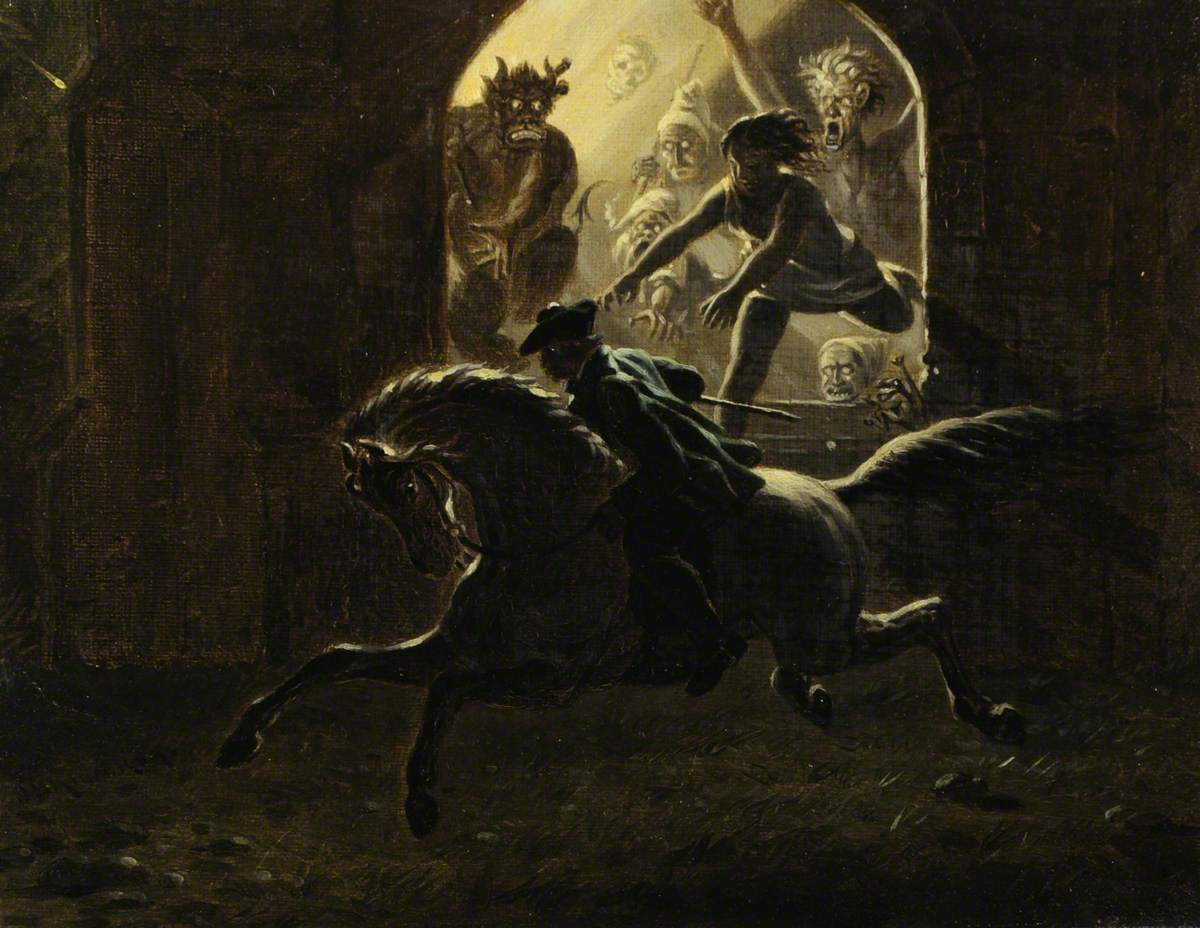
On Horseback, Galloping away from Alloway Kirk

== Sources ==
- Cust, Lionel Henry (1892). "Kidd, Joseph Bartholomew" . In Lee, Sidney (ed.). Dictionary of National Biography. Vol. 31. London: Smith, Elder & Co. p. 92.
- Oliver, Valerie Cassel, ed. (2011). "Kidd, Joseph Bartholomew". In Benezit Dictionary of Artists. Oxford Art Online. Oxford University Press.
- Stuchtey, Henriette (2021). "Kidd, Joseph Bartholomew". In Beyer, Andreas; Savoy, Bénédicte; and Tegethoff, Wolf (eds.). Allgemeines Künstlerlexikon - Internationale Künstlerdatenbank. De Gruyter.
- Weeks, Emily M. (2004). "Kidd, Joseph Bartholomew (1808–1889), painter". In Oxford Dictionary of National Biography. Oxford University Press.
