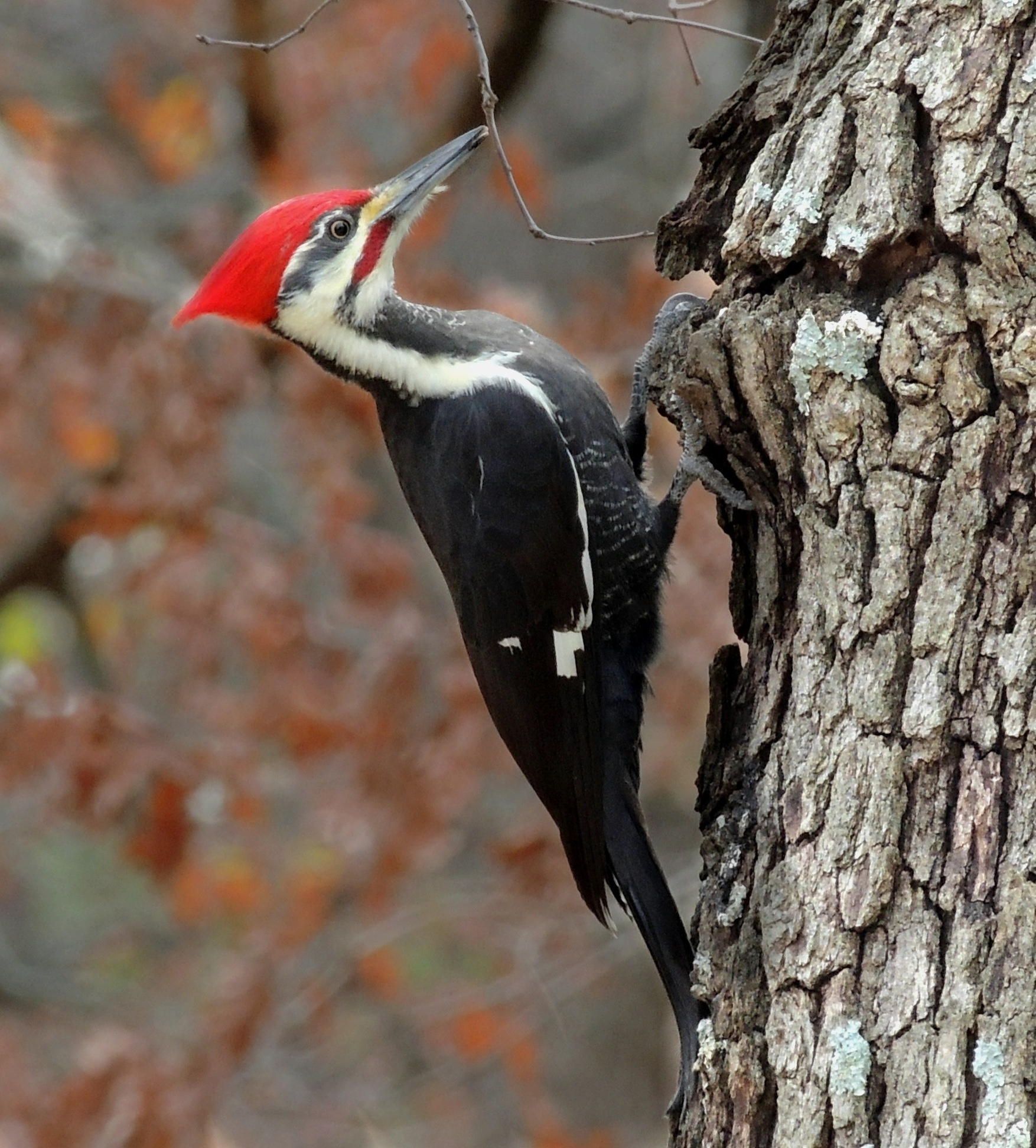
- Male
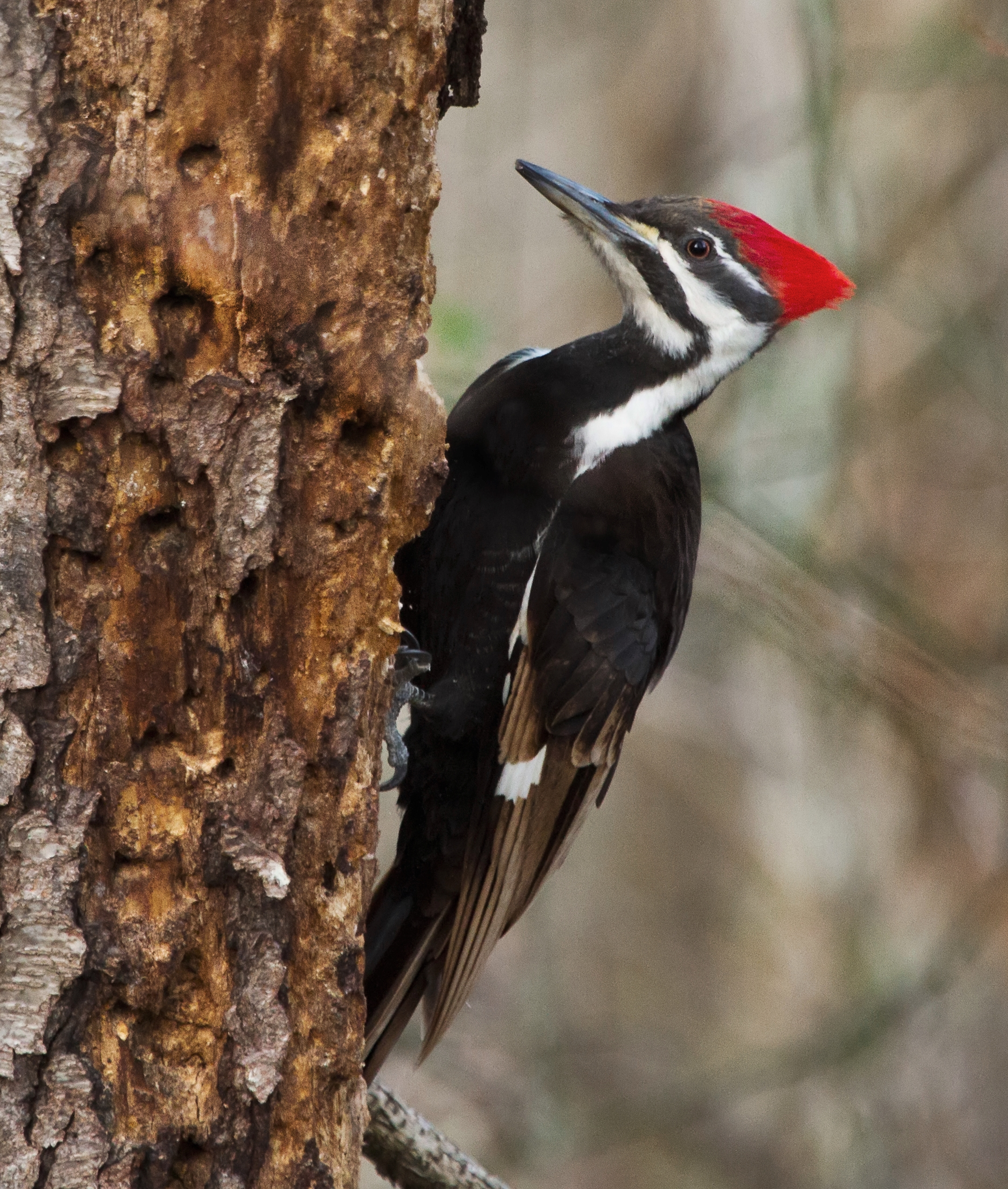
- Female

Conservation status
- Least Concern (IUCN 3.1)

- Secure (NatureServe)

Scientific classification
- Kingdom: Animalia
- Phylum: Chordata
- Class: Aves
- Order: Piciformes
- Family: Picidae
- Genus: Dryocopus
- Species: D. pileatus

Binomial name
- Dryocopus pileatus (Linnaeus, 1758)
- Approximate distribution map Year-round

Synonyms
- Picus pileatus Linnaeus, 1758; Hylatomus pileatus Linnaeus, 1758

= Pileated woodpecker =

Pileated woodpecker Temporal range: Late Pleistocene–present

Species of bird

The pileated woodpecker (/ˈpaɪlieɪtəd, ˈpɪl-/ PY-lee-ay-tid, PIL-ee-; Dryocopus pileatus) is a large, crow-sized woodpecker with a prominent red crest, white neck stripe, and a mostly black body. This woodpecker is native to North America, where it is the largest confirmed extant woodpecker species and the third-largest extant species of woodpecker in the world, after the great slaty woodpecker and the black woodpecker. It inhabits deciduous forests in eastern North America, the Great Lakes, the boreal forests of Canada, and parts of the Pacific Coast. This woodpecker is primarily an insectivore, eating insects that live in trees; it is famous for making large, nearly rectangular carvings into trees, which are used to extract prey inside the tree or to make a nest. The species has a large range and an increasing population, causing it to be categorized as a species of "least concern" by the IUCN.

== Taxonomy ==
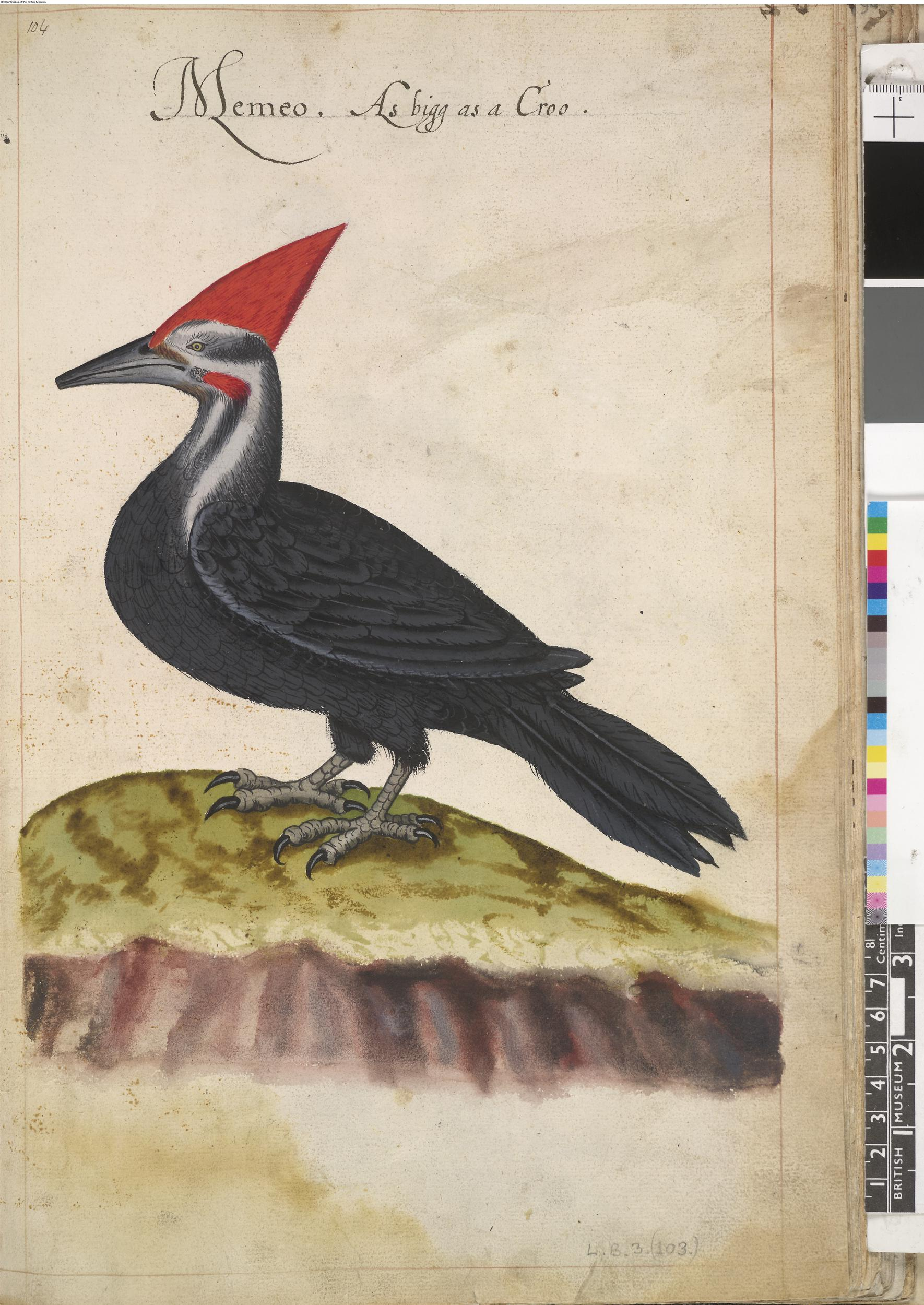
Southern Pileated Woodpecker after John White, 1585.

English naturalist Mark Catesby described and illustrated the pileated woodpecker in his book The Natural History of Carolina, Florida and the Bahama Islands, which was published between 1729 and 1732. Catesby used the English name "The larger red-crested Wood-pecker" and the Latin Picus niger maximus capite rubro. When in 1758 the Swedish naturalist Carl Linnaeus updated his Systema Naturae for the tenth edition, he included the pileated woodpecker, coined the binomial name Picus pileatus and cited Catesby's book. The specific epithet pileatus is a Latin word meaning "-capped". The type locality is South Carolina. The pileated woodpecker is now one of six species that the International Ornithological Committee and the Clements taxonomy place in genus Dryocopus. The North American Classification Committee of the American Ornithological Society concurs for the pileated and lineated woodpeckers, the only two of the six that occur in Central and North America. However, BirdLife International's Handbook of the Birds of the World (HBW) places the pileated and several others in genus Hylatomus. The genus Dryocopus was introduced by the German naturalist Friedrich Boie in 1826.

Two subspecies of Dryocopus pileatus are recognized:

- Northern pileated woodpecker (D. p. abieticola): Outram Bangs observed in 1898 that enough morphological differences existed between the two types of pileated woodpeckers to classify the northern pileated woodpecker as its own subspecies. They are found in southern Canada south through the western, north-central, and northeastern United States.
- Southern pileated woodpecker (D. p. pileatus): They are found in the Southeastern United States.

== Description ==
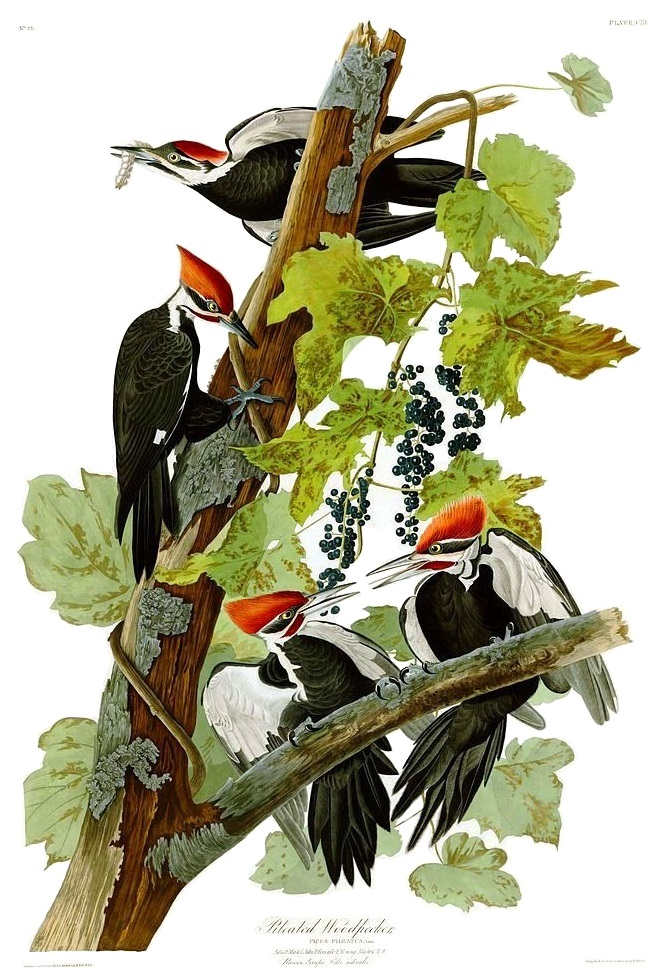
Plate 111 of the Birds of America by John James Audubon, depicting pileated woodpeckers (1 ♀, 3 ♂♂)

Pileated woodpeckers are mainly black with a red crest and have a white line down the sides of the throat. Adult males have a red line from the bill to the throat; in adult females, these are black. They also have white wing feathers that show when in flight. Adults are 40 to 49 cm (16 to 19 in) long, span 66 to 75 cm (26 to 30 in) across the wings, and weigh 225 to 400 g (7.9 to 14.1 oz). The average weight of females and males combined is about 277 g (9.8 oz), with males weighing about 300 g (11 oz) and females weighing about 256 g (9.0 oz) in mean body mass. The wing chord measures 21.4 to 25.3 cm (8.4 to 10.0 in), the tail measures 14.0 to 17.4 cm (5.5 to 6.9 in), the bill is 4.1 to 6.0 cm (1.6 to 2.4 in), and the tarsus measures 3.1 to 3.8 cm (1.2 to 1.5 in).

Southern pileated woodpeckers have ebony feathers, less white on the feathers by the wings, and are smaller in overall size compared to their northern counterparts.

Northern pileated woodpeckers are larger in wing, tail, and beak size. They also have feathers that are a lighter black with tinges of brown and gray and whiter feathers on their flanks.

Juvenile pileated woodpeckers tend to have less curved crests, or "mohawks" as some refer to them. The flight of these birds is strong and direct, but undulates in the way characteristic of woodpeckers. Two species found in the Old World, the white-bellied woodpecker (D. javensis) and black woodpeckers (D. martius), are closely related and occupy the same ecological niche in their respective ranges that the pileated occupies in North America. The only North American birds of similar plumage and size are the (likely extinct) ivory-billed woodpecker of the Southeastern United States and Cuba and the related imperial woodpecker of Mexico.

== Distribution and habitat ==
The pileated woodpecker's breeding habitat is forested areas across Canada, the eastern United States, and parts of the Pacific Coast. This bird favors mature forests and heavily wooded parks. They specifically prefer mesic habitats with large, mature hardwood trees, often being found in large tracts of forest. However, they also inhabit smaller woodlots as long as they have a scattering of tall trees. These woodlots are known as late-successional forests. The pileated woodpecker population shrank drastically in the 1700s and 1800s due to habitat loss, but they have since made a nice recovery. Pileated woodpeckers are believed to be essential in their habitat for many reasons, such as providing nest cavities for other species due to their tree carvings, controlling some insect populations, and by breaking off bits of dying trees so that they can degrade faster.

Pileated woodpeckers mainly eat insects, especially carpenter ants and wood-boring beetle larvae. They are also known to eat fruits, nuts, and berries, including those found on poison ivy.

== Behavior ==
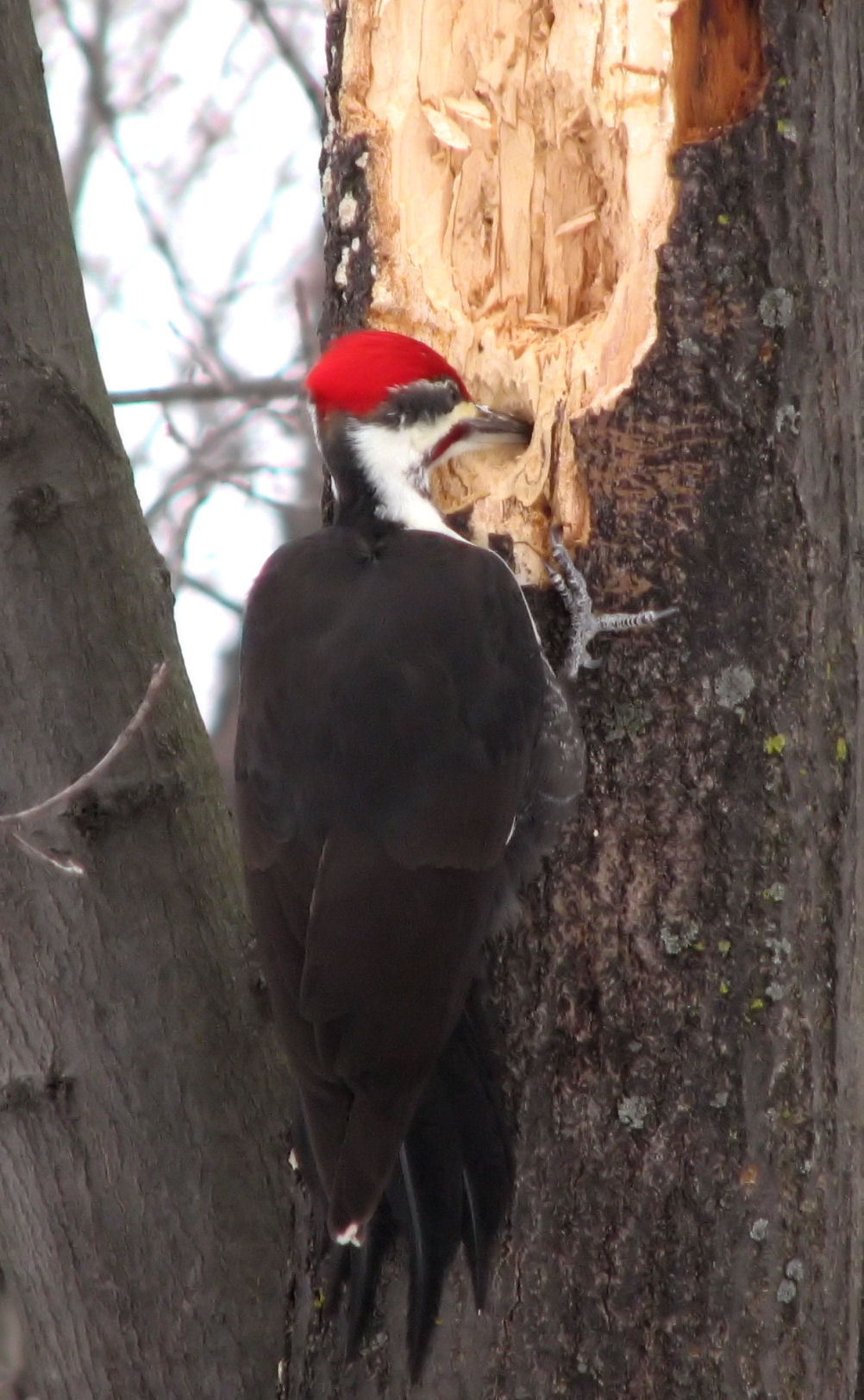
Male drilling

=== Foraging ===
Pileated woodpeckers often chip out large and roughly rectangular holes in trees while searching out insects, especially ant colonies. They also lap up ants by reaching with their long tongues into crevices. They are self-assured on the vertical surfaces of large trees but can seem awkward while eating fruits and berries on small branches and vines. They may also forage on or near the ground, especially around fallen, dead trees, which can contain a variety of insect life. This foraging technique is especially common after a forest fire, where pileated woodpeckers have been seen to flock to the downed trees in search of insects that tried to take refuge in them. They have also been known to eat poison oak seeds and manzanita fruit. They may also forage around the sides of human homes, cars, and suet-type feeders. Although they are less likely feeder visitors than smaller woodpeckers, pileateds may regularly be attracted to them in areas experiencing harsh winter conditions.

=== Breeding behavior ===
Pileated woodpeckers engage in many courtship displays such as drumming, bill waving and "woick" calls to try to get a mate or to communicate with a pre-existing one. Once the birds have found a mate, they typically stay together for life. The pileated woodpecker can nest in boxes about 4.6 m (15 ft) off the ground; usually, however, pileated woodpeckers excavate their large nests in the cavities of dead trees. Woodpeckers make such large holes in dead trees that the holes can cause a small tree to break in half. The nesting holes are mostly made by the male, but the female is involved in assisting the male during this process. In early spring, the woodpecker pair begins to make the hole, and work continues on it throughout the season. The cavity is unlined except for wood chips. During the process of picking the nest site and making the hole, the pair uses tapping as a primary form of communication. Sometimes, pileated woodpeckers start making a nest, then abandon it and build a new nest elsewhere, but this spot can be revisited in the future to finish creating the nest. Pileated woodpeckers may also move to another site if any eggs have fallen out of the nest—a rare habit in birds. Once the nest is complete and the female lays her 3-5 eggs in late spring, both parents incubate them for 12 to 16 days. The average clutch size is four per nest. The young may take a month to fledge. Once the brood is raised, the birds abandon the hole and do not use it as a nesting site the next year, especially since most nesting sites are built in places structurally unfit for another breeding season. Old nesting sites may be used as roosting holes by pileated woodpeckers and can be expanded throughout the years. However, if this does not happen, these holes—made similarly by all woodpeckers—provide good homes in future years for many forest songbirds and a wide variety of other animals. Owls and tree-nesting ducks may largely rely on holes made by pileateds to lay their nests. Even mammals such as raccoons may use them. Other woodpeckers and smaller birds, such as wrens, may be attracted to pileated holes to feed on the insects found in them. Ecologically, the entire woodpecker family is important to the well-being of many other bird species.

call

=== Territorial behavior ===
display drum (a short burst of 10 taps)

A pileated woodpecker pair stays together on its territory all year round and is not migratory. They defend the territory in all seasons, but tolerate floaters during the winter. When defending their nest from either rival conspecifics or from other species, the female is more involved. When clashing with them, they engage in wing and crest intimidation displays, chasing, high-pitched calling, striking with the wings, and jabbing with the bill. Drumming is used to proclaim territory, and they often do this on hollow trees to make the most resonant sound possible. The pattern is typically a fairly slow, deep rolling that lasts about 3 seconds.

=== Predation ===
Predators at the nest can include American and Pacific martens, weasels, squirrels, rat snakes, and gray foxes. These predators usually wait for the woodpeckers to leave the nest and attack the nestlings or try to trap the birds and/or the nestlings in the nest. The woodpecker usually uses intimidation displays involving rapid head motions and wing flapping, and if those failed, then would try to strike the attacker with its bill. The woodpecker may choose to relocate the nest after an encounter like this to avoid repeat attacks from the same predator.

Free-flying adults have fewer predators, but can be taken in some numbers by Cooper's hawks, northern goshawks, red-shouldered hawks, red-tailed hawks, great horned owls, bald eagles, golden eagles, and barred owls. These birds of prey attempt to ambush the woodpecker mid-flight to catch it by surprise and to minimize the threat of being hit by the woodpecker's powerful bill. In response to birds of prey sightings, the woodpeckers ascend the tree trunk for a better view and use "cuk" calls both as an alarm call and as a potential distraction to the attacker. Additionally, the woodpecker can fly in unpredictable patterns to evade capture or can use its beak to fend off these birds.

== Status ==
The pileated woodpecker occupies an extensive range and is quite adaptable. Its ability to survive in many wooded habitat types, such as suburban areas with trees and/or parks, has allowed the species to survive human habitation of North America and contradicts the original belief that these woodpeckers needed large swaths of forests to survive. Additionally, efforts to restore woodland by removing invasive honeysuckle and buckthorn seem to benefit them, as the removal of brush and shrubbery facilitates their foraging on the ground and in lower strata. Overall, pileated woodpeckers have a large population size, with 2.6 million estimated to be living in North America, but this number is growing. From 1966 to 2015, their population, on average, has increased by greater than 1.5% per year throughout the northeastern U.S., the Maritimes, the Ohio River Valley, and around the Great Lakes. Despite being nonmigratory, they are protected under the U.S. Migratory Bird Act. While the large birds control many insect populations, especially tree beetles, that may otherwise experience outbreaks, some people may consider them harmful if found on their property due to the considerable damage that pileated woodpeckers can do to trees and homes. Additionally, they have also been seen making nesting holes in newly placed telephone poles, which often causes significant structural damage to the poles, prompting investments in strategies to mitigate woodpecker damage.

== Cultural references ==
Cartoonist Walter Lantz is believed to have based the appearance of his creation Woody Woodpecker on the pileated woodpecker; while patterning the call on the acorn woodpecker.

== Gallery ==
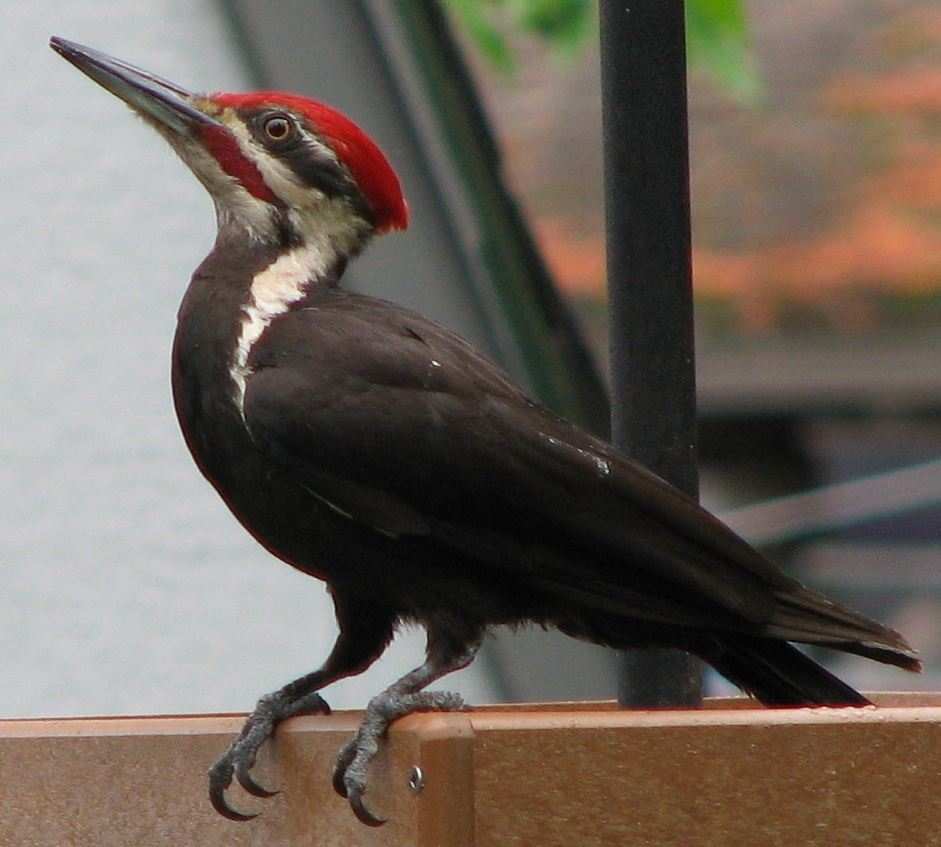
Male on a platform feeder

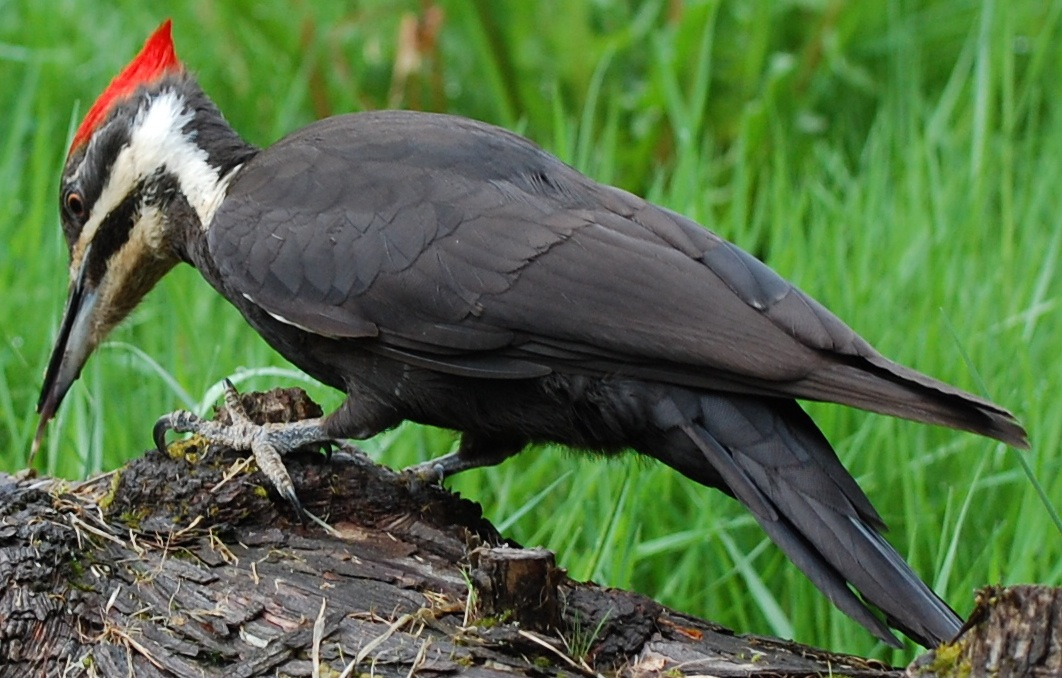
Adult female at an ant-infested log

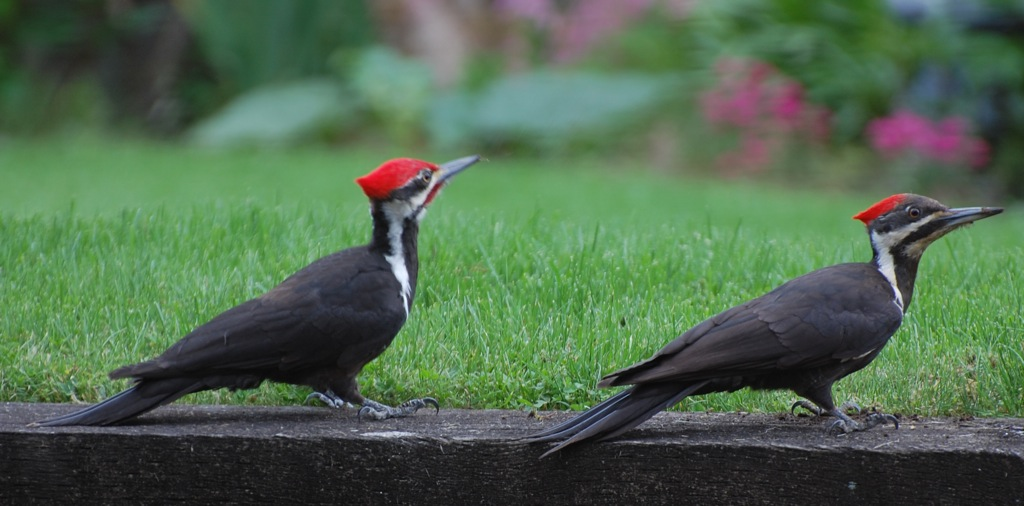
Mating pair

Male eating suet

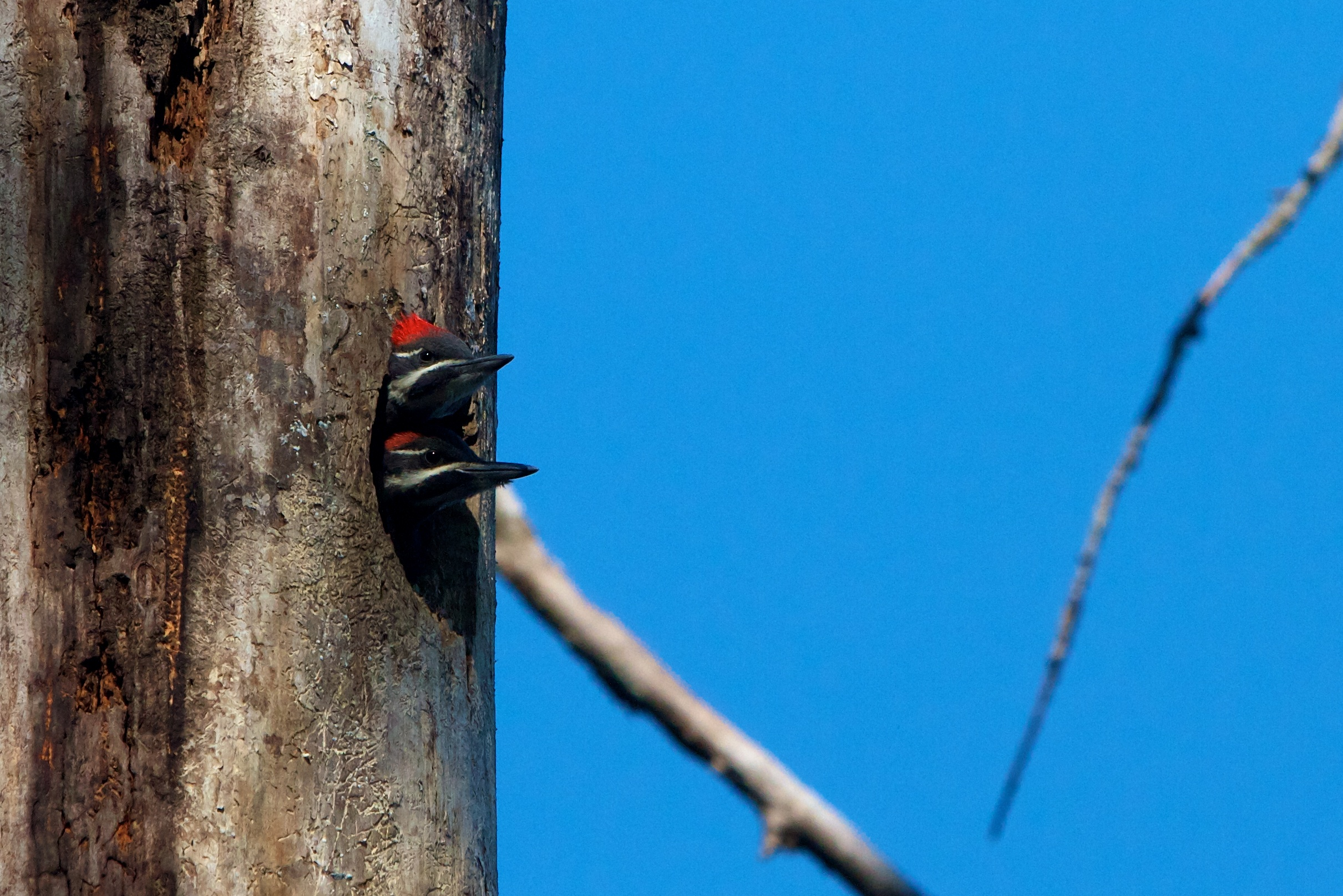
Female chicks peeking from nest cavity

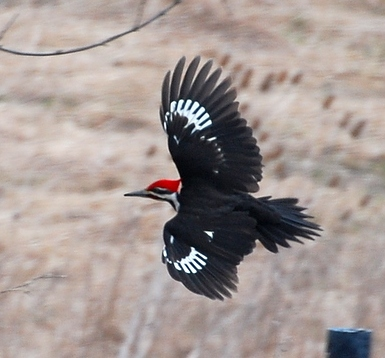
Male in flight

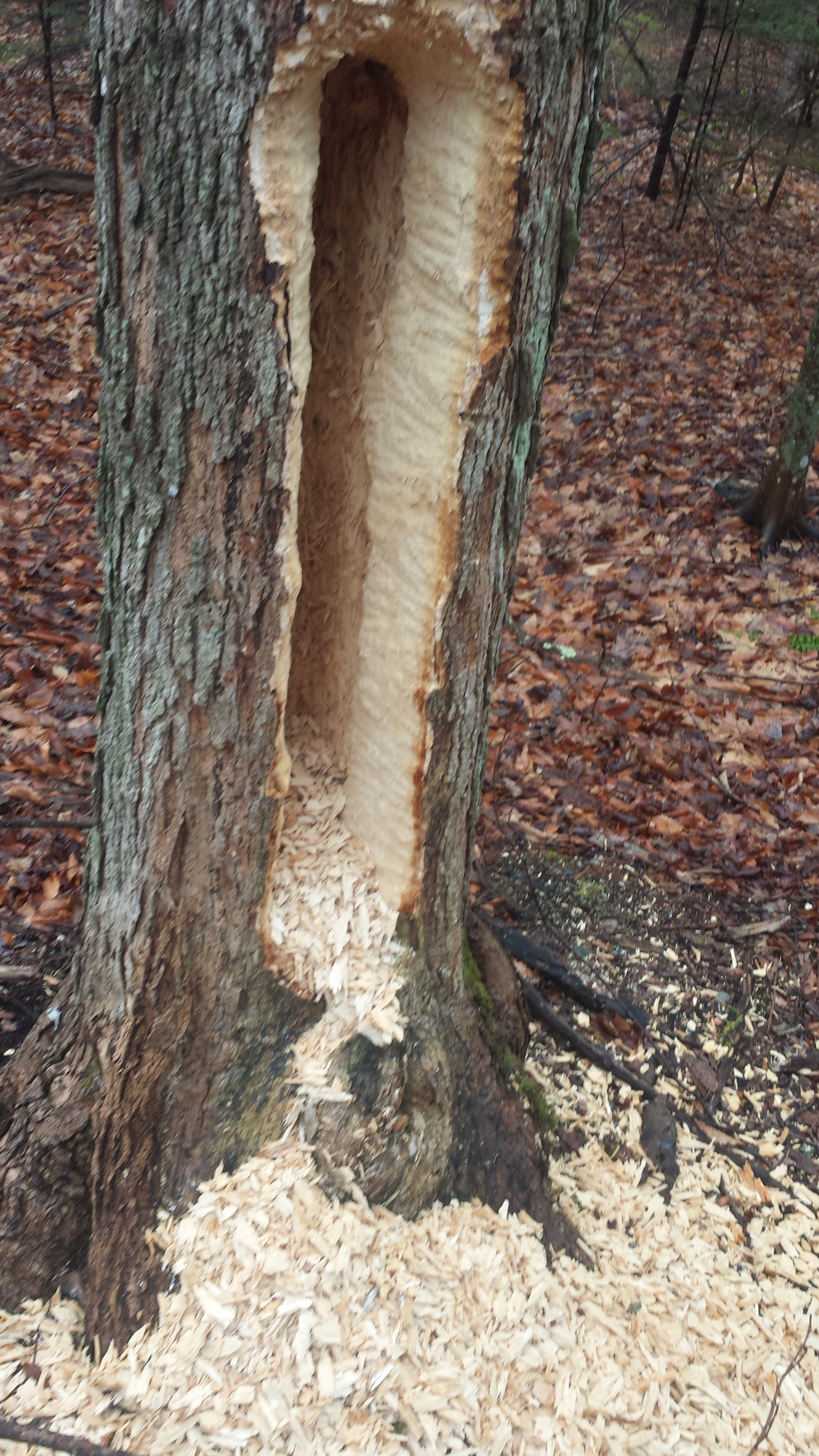
Damage to a tree by a pileated woodpecker searching for bugs, a cavity roughly 3' tall, 4-6" wide, and 8" deep (90×10-15×20 cm)

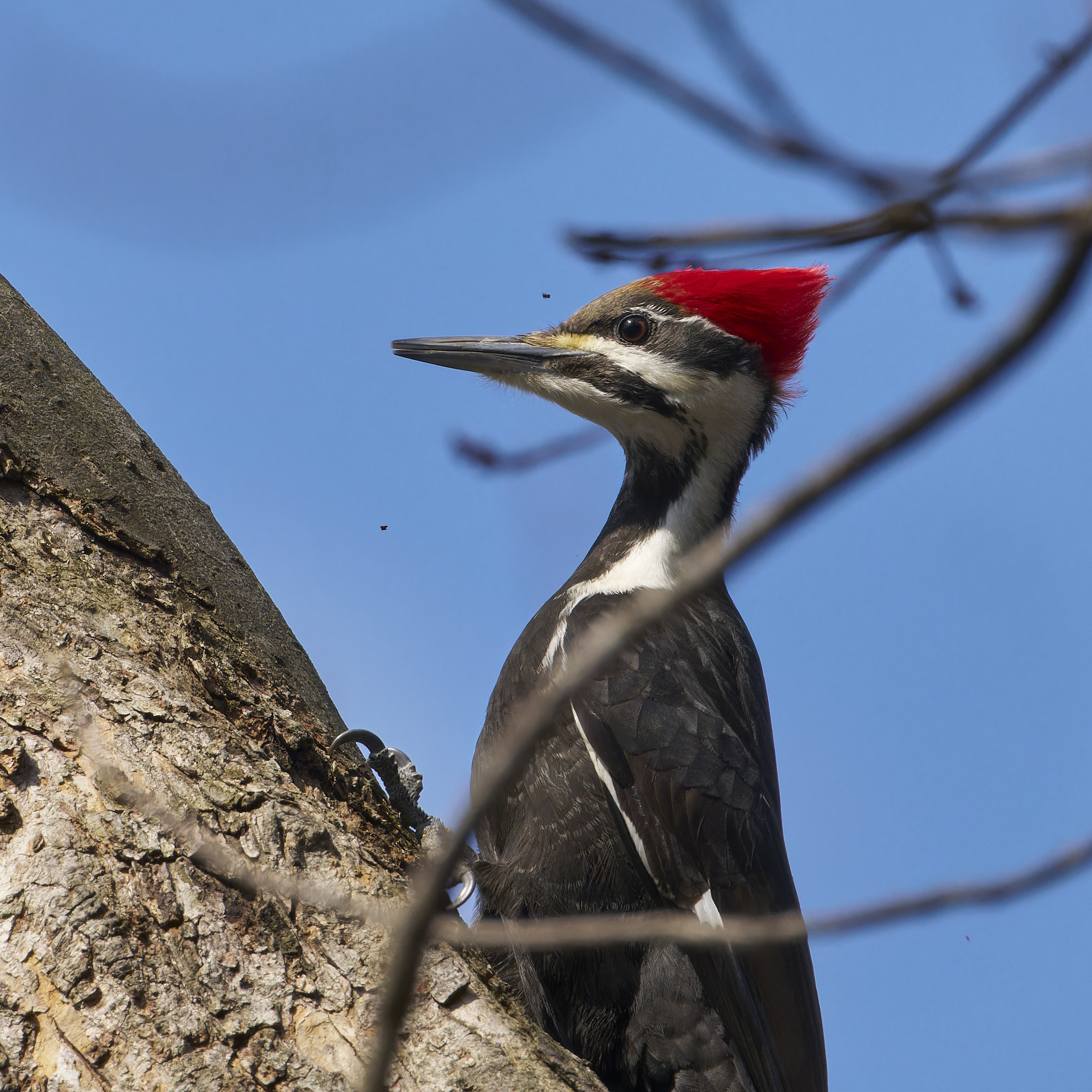
Female, Glastonbury, CT USA
