= William Kidd (painter) =

Scottish artist

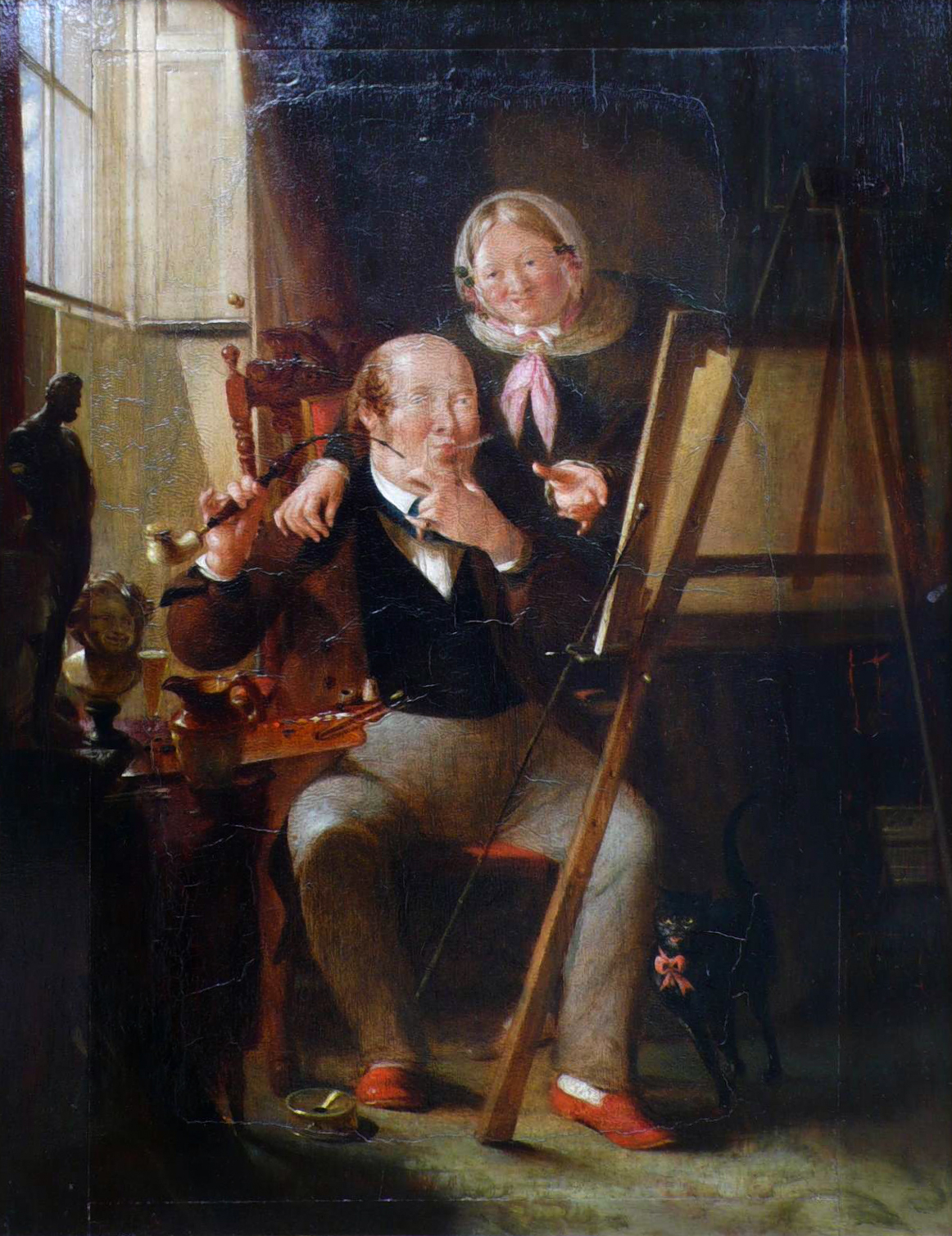
William Kidd, self-portrait with wife, c1843

William Kidd H.R.S.A. (c.1796 – 24 December 1863) was a prolific Scottish artist known for his comic depictions of cosy domestic scenes in romantic-era Scotland and England. He also illustrated works of various authors including Sir Walter Scott and Robert Burns.

== Early life ==
Little is known at this time of his family and early education. He was born in Scotland in 1796. At an early age he was apprenticed to James Howe (30 August 1780 – 11 July 1836) who was an Edinburgh artist known for his depictions of domestic animals. One of Kidd's earliest pieces, "Cobbler's Shop by W. Kidd, aged 13 years, apprentice to J. Howe" was exhibited in Edinburgh in 1809 at the first exhibition of the Associated Artists. Other pieces of the period include The Travelling Showman, Head of Cowgate, Flesh Caddie and various portraits of horses which won him some slight praise from critics of the period.

Kidd later apprenticed with Gavin Beugo, a house painter and decorator. David Roberts, R.A. was a fellow-apprentice of Beugo and lifelong friend. Kidd first exhibited at the Royal Academy in London in 1817 and his pieces were seldom absent from the Academy until about 1840. In approximately 1820, Kidd moved to London, as did many young aspiring artists of his time. Perhaps he was responding to the accolades from the critics who stated he: "…is on the high road to excellence in his particular department."

In the 1820s he began to explore and develop his comic depictions of domestic scenes. His clever humour and dramatic figure painting brought considerable praise and attracted the attention of many period authors and artists of note. His works of this period, 1820–1835, were compared to contemporary Sir David Wilkie, and many of his pieces were being turned into engravings for publications in books. Kidd was clearly influenced by the likes of Wilkie, William Allan and Alexander Carse; earlier proponents of the Scots genre painting.

Kidd's paintings of the period are often bright displays of homely scenes of peasant life, "the peasant with a cosy cottage, where a certain comfort surrounds the perennial making of love and butter, excited his easy interest." His use of vibrant colours combined with a distracting use of cluttered detail brings a certain familiarity to his works so that the viewer has the distinct impression that they have seen the piece previously. The humour in Kidd's paintings is often subtle and unpretentious and maybe overlooked in the context of the myriad of details within his pieces. William D. McKay expressed it best when he wrote "most of Kidd's work, verging on vulgarity, shows much excellent painting in the central group. The composition suffers from the overcrowding of the subsidiary parts."

== Middle period ==
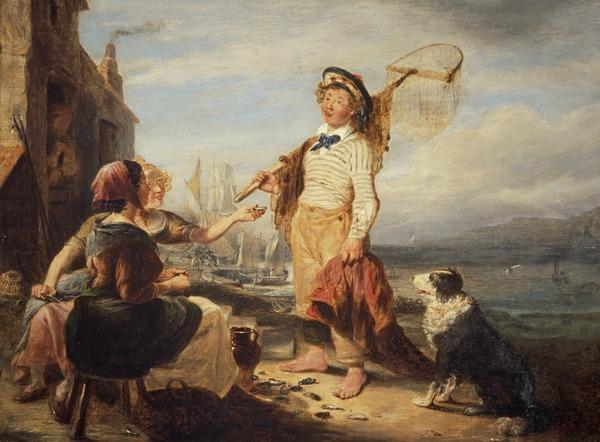
Fisher Folk

While the early artistic life of Kidd was clearly not easy, the period 1835-1855 was probably the most difficult for Kidd as an artist. During this period he illustrated several scenes from novels by Sir Walter Scott and poems from Robbie Burns. This was a common theme amongst period artists, their "bread and butter" for income, and has been referred to as "the great age of Scott painting." Another common theme of this time was various images of the Greenwich and Chelsea pensioners, the survivors of Trafalgar and Waterloo. It may have been that Kidd accompanied James Howe and Alexander Carse on their visit to the battlefield of Waterloo in 1815. Or he may have been copying earlier themes from Wilkie.

Some of his work during this period met with some acclaim but much went unrewarded; exhibited time and time again in Liverpool, Edinburgh and London. His pieces of this period sold for a few British pounds, whereas earlier pieces had sold for several guineas. In the 1830s Kidd seemed to be perpetually moving and unsettled even though he was still quite prolific. Later critics write: "William Kidd…gave more promise in his youth than was fulfilled in after-years, on account of neglecting his own interest" which suggests that he spent much of his time drinking and carousing. This is mirrored by Walter Armstrong who says: "Kidd was vulgar, reckless, and a bit of a genius…"

However, on 6 September 1842, in Old Church, Saint Pancras, London, Kidd married Jane Lindsay Carphin, née Hay, relict of John Carphin and began a new domestic life. The Carphin family was also from Edinburgh and had moved to London about the same time as Kidd. The children of Mrs. Carphin were merchant ship masters and the family had some financial resources. For several years Kidd's life was somewhat more stable. In 1849 Kidd was elected an honorary member of the Royal Scottish Academy, however, it would appear that Kidd had used up the family funds by that time and his letters to Patrick Allan begin to sound desperate in their appeal for funds. He writes: "dire necessity (of) being completely driven up into a corner, but finding I must be obliged to make a sacrifice of some of my pictures. As times are so bad and nothing selling, I have not received any money since I had it from your dear self." In letters to Allan in 1853 he mentioned he had not recovered from illness suffered seven years previously. The sons of artist Benjamin Robert Haydon (1786–1846) provide further insight into this mysterious illness, "Kidd went mad shortly after my father's death from horror and Fred saw him in Hanwell Asylum in '47-8. Frank Haydon." B.R. Haydon had attempted suicide by shooting himself however when the bullet failed to kill him he completed the task with his straight razor. The poverty and events of Haydon's life were too familiar subjects to his friend Kidd.

Additional events in the early 1850s further contributed to his continued decline. In 1851, John Henry Pegg, a lawyer and husband of his stepdaughter Isobella, died. Isobella and her two children moved back to London to live with her mother and Kidd. In 1852, his stepson, Captain John Carphin, was killed in a gunfight in California and his other stepson, George Carphin first mate of the Eglinton, was shipwrecked on the coast of Australia. The news of these events, Kidd's lingering mental illness and the failing finances may have contributed to the death of Kidd's wife and she died in July 1854 leaving Kidd alone with the burden of a stepdaughter and two stepgrandchildren.

== Later years ==
From about 1855 through to his death on 24 December 1863, Kidd painted very little, if at all. Any pieces that may have been done during this period were probably replicates or re-workings of earlier pieces. Furthermore, it seems that during this period his stepdaughter was taking care of him due to his failing health. Kidd and his stepdaughter continued to send letters to beg for funds from various persons within the Royal Scottish Academy. Upon hearing of Kidd's death, David Roberts, R.A., in his diary writes: "Poor fellow, he was one of those sons of genius quite incapable of managing his worldly affairs, and had lived from hand to mouth, as the saying is, all his days. All my attempts to help him seemed to have no effect; but latterly, with £50 yearly from the Academy and other helps, he must have been as well off as he ever had been at any former period of his life."

Kidd's contemporaries had high praise for his work. Roberts states: "By far the best artist among them was my late friend William Kidd, who afterwards painted many excellent pictures, embodying the humour and pathos of Scottish life in a most delightful manner." McKay recounts Kidd "seems never to have had much success, though his works reveal a talent which ought to have given him a high rank amongst painters."

Kidd's pieces failed to have a lasting impact on the art world. Walter Armstrong in his book, Scottish Painters: a critical study, harshly but correctly states "Kidd's pictures are almost, if not quite, unknown in galleries. They are to be met with pretty frequently in the dealers' shops, where they are often called by other names. I must confess that only at rare intervals have I found myself confronted by one that deserved a place even in the most liberal 'National Gallery of British Art'." That being said, today examples of Kidd's labours can be found in the Patrick Allan-Fraser Hospitalfield Trust in Arbroath, Scotland; in the Burns Monument Trust; the National Gallery of Scotland in Edinburgh; the Tyne and Wear Museums; and in Leeds Museums and Galleries.
