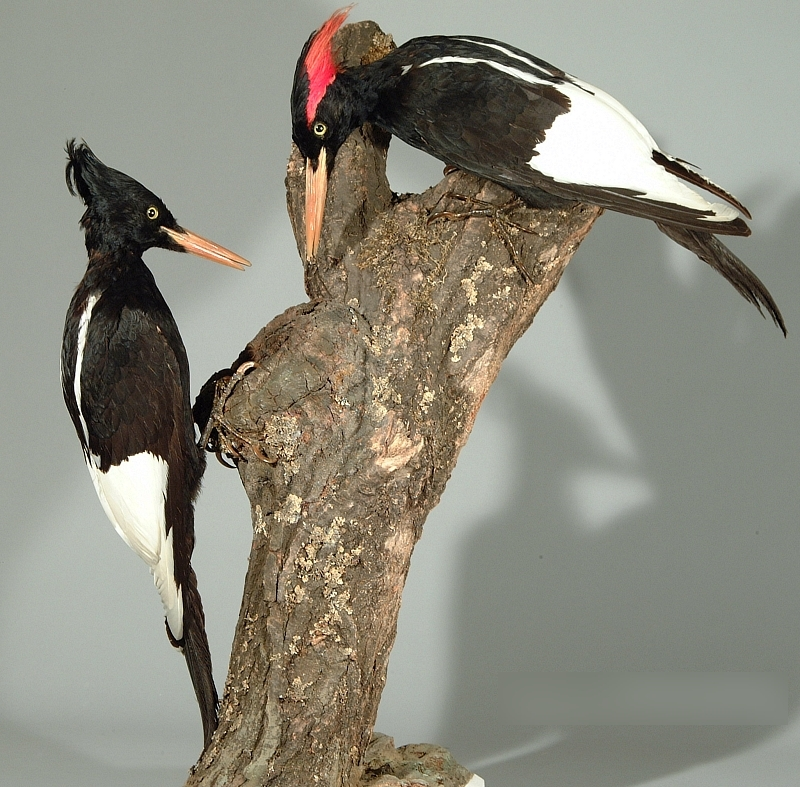
- Female (left) and male (right) mounted specimens, Museum Wiesbaden

Conservation status
- Critically endangered, possibly extinct (IUCN 3.1)

Scientific classification
- Kingdom: Animalia
- Phylum: Chordata
- Class: Aves
- Order: Piciformes
- Family: Picidae
- Genus: Campephilus
- Species: C. imperialis

Binomial name
- Campephilus imperialis (Gould, 1832)

Synonyms
- Picus imperialis Gould, 1832

= Imperial woodpecker =

Possibly extinct species of woodpecker

The imperial woodpecker (Campephilus imperialis) is a woodpecker species endemic to Mexico. Measuring approximately 56–60 cm (22–23.5 in) in length, it is the largest known woodpecker. Because of its close taxonomic relationship and resemblance to the ivory-billed woodpecker (C. principalis), it is sometimes referred to as the Mexican ivory-billed woodpecker. However, this name has also been applied to the extant pale-billed woodpecker (C. guatemalensis). The bird was well known to the Indigenous peoples of Mexico, who had several names for the species. It was called cuauhtotomomi in Nahuatl, uagam by the Tepehuán and cumecócari by the Tarahumara.

There have been no confirmed sightings since 1956. The species is generally considered extinct, although the possibility that a small number of individuals survive in remote areas of its former range has not been completely ruled out.

== Description and ecology ==
Turnaround video of a male study skin RMNH.AVES.110098, the Naturalis Biodiversity Center

The imperial woodpecker's typical size ranges from 56 to 60 centimetres (22.0 to 23.6 in). The male imperial woodpecker has a red-sided crest, centered black, but otherwise mostly black, with large white wing-patches, thin white "braces" on its mantle and a huge ivory-colored bill. They are all black except for the inner primaries, which are white-tipped, the white secondaries and a white scapular stripe which, unlike the ivory-billed woodpecker, does not extend onto the neck. The female is similar, but her crest is all black and (unlike the female ivory-bill) recurved at the top, lacking any red. Much larger than any other sympatric woodpecker, it is the only woodpecker in the area with solid black underparts. Its voice is reportedly toy trumpet-like. The bird was once widespread and, until the early 1950s, not uncommon throughout the Sierra Madre Occidental of Mexico, from western Sonora and Chihuahua southwards to Jalisco and Michoacán. It is likely that, in the past, the woodpecker's range followed the Sierra Madre north into Arizona, but by the time it was scientifically described in the 19th century, it was already confined to Mexico. It has been suggested that it might occur in Arizona, and there is also a hypothetical record of it in 1958 in Big Bend National Park, Texas, however this is not mentioned in Oberholser's two-volume The Bird Life of Texas.

The imperial woodpecker prefers open montane forests made up of pine – oak forest dominated by large pines and with numerous dead trees, usually between 2,100 and 2,700 m (6,900 and 8,900 ft) above sea level. Most records are from elevations of 1,920 to 3,050 m (6,300 to 10,010 ft), but there are records as low as 1,675 m (5,500 ft). Large-growing pines native in the Sierra Madre Occidental include Durango, Chihuahua white, Apache and Arizona pines. It feeds mainly on the insect larvae found underneath bark scaled from dead pine trees. There are many reports of more than four individuals, and this grouping behaviour may be related to its foraging specialisation. Breeding has been recorded between February and June, and probably one to four eggs are laid. A mated pair requires a very large area of untouched mature forest to survive, approximately 25 km^{2} (9.7 sq mi); outside the breeding season, the birds are reported to form small groups of up to 12 individuals and move about a wide area, apparently in response to the availability of food. The main food source, beetle larvae in snags, is probably distributed in patches and peaks within a short period of time. Consequently, feeding sites are probably best exploited by "nomadic" groups. If operating in groups of seven or eight individuals, the minimum area of old-growth forest for a group is 98 km^{2} (38 sq mi).

The Cornell Lab of Ornithology has released a film of the imperial woodpecker recorded in Mexico in 1956.

== Decline and possible extinction ==
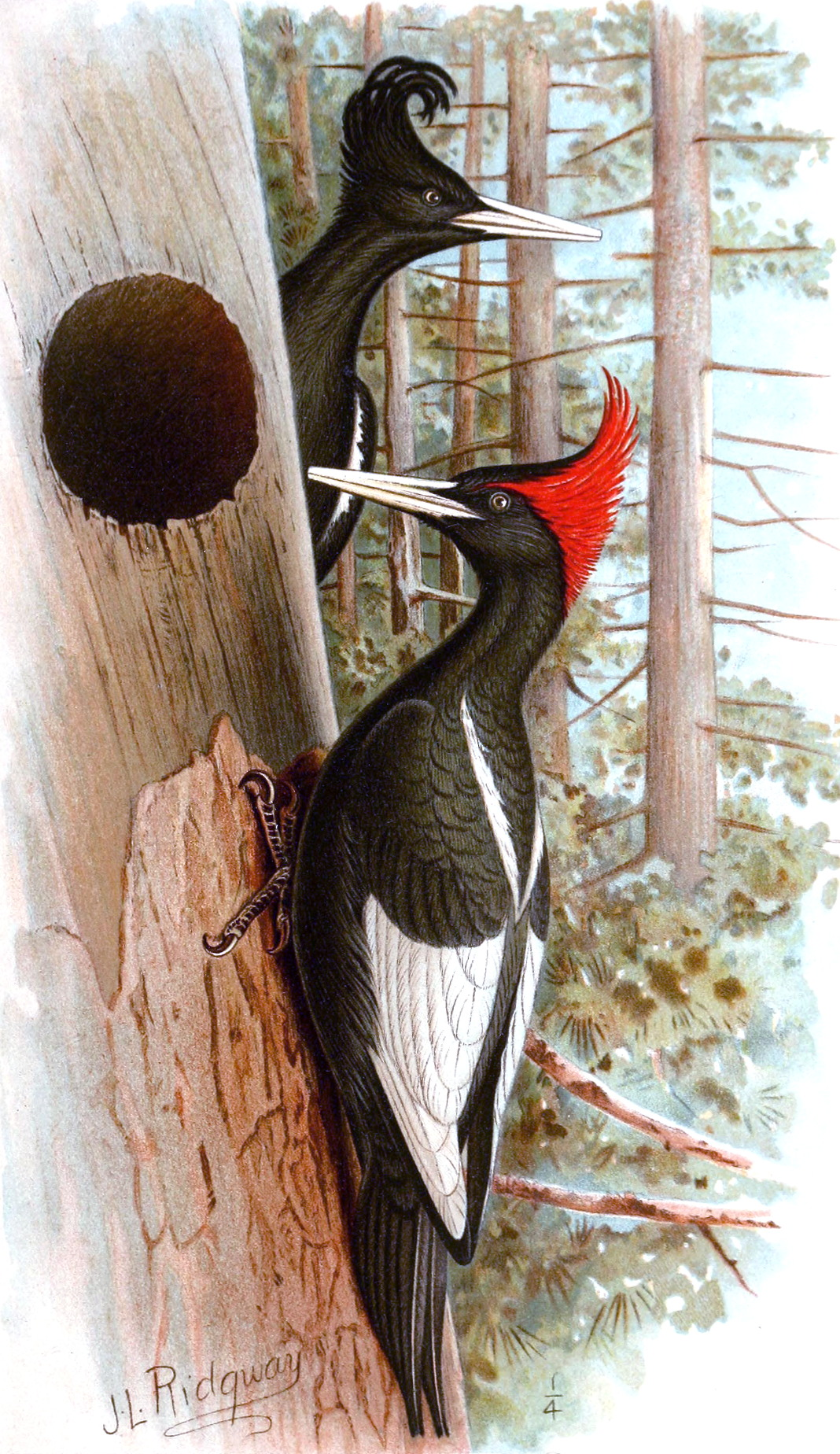
Adult male (front) and adult female (back)

The imperial woodpecker is officially listed as "critically endangered (possibly extinct)" by the IUCN and BirdLife International. It was not historically a rare species within a suitable habitat, but the total population probably never numbered more than 8,000 individuals (Lammertink et al. 1996). Any remaining population is assumed to be tiny (numbering fewer than 50 mature individuals) based on the lack of confirmed records since 1956; analyses of remaining habitats indicate that no tracts remain which are large enough to support the species. The last confirmed record was from Durango in 1956 and the species is very likely now extinct. If they have gone extinct, it would have been due to habitat destruction and fragmentation combined with hunting. These factors are the reason why the species has not been seen in over 60 years, although there have been local reports of sightings. Researchers believe that their decline was also accelerated by active eradication campaigns conducted by logging interests and by over-hunting — for use in folk medicine and because nestlings were considered a delicacy by the Tarahumara. It has been hunted for sport, food and for medicinal purposes over a long period of time and feathers and bills were reportedly used in rituals by the Tepheuana and Huichol tribes in the south of Durango. Additionally, imperial woodpeckers are stunning birds and, as the species became increasingly rare, many were apparently shot by people who had never encountered such a bird and wanted to get a closer look.

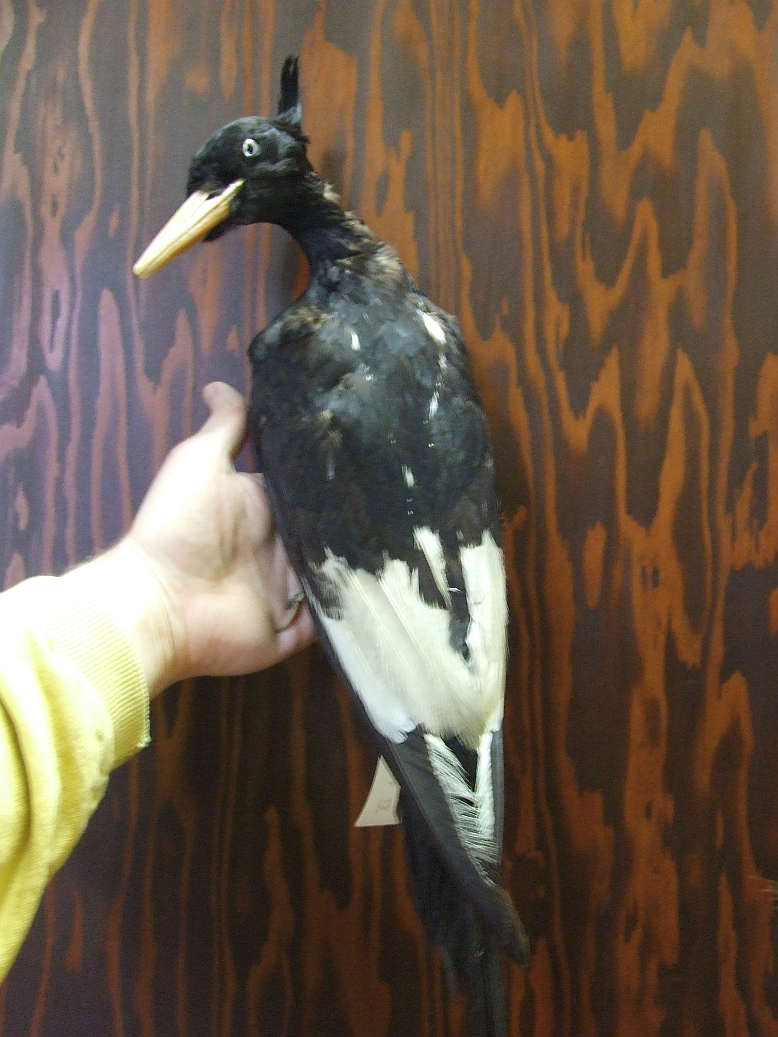
Female preserved specimen at the Museum für Naturkunde, Berlin; note hand for size comparison

The habitat in which the imperial woodpecker was located is predominantly montane pine-oak forests. The area in which they lived was abundant with large dead trees, the removal of which could be linked to their extinction. The area had been cleared and logged multiple times by 2010. Increasing effort in conservation biology is being devoted to the analysis of the extinction risk as well as the search for the rare, long unseen, species. There are a handful of more recent, unconfirmed sightings, the most recent of which closely followed the 2005 publication of the purported rediscovery of the ivory-billed woodpecker. Lammertink et al. (1996), after extensively reviewing post-1956 reports, conclude that the species did indeed survive into the 1990s in the central part of its range, but also consider its continued survival very unlikely. According to them, the population was always restricted in historic times, although the species was indeed present in maximum density before a catastrophic decline during the 1950s. The lack of good records from that time is apparently based more on lack of research than on actual rarity, but this seems to have changed radically only one decade later.

Field research by Tim Gallagher and Martjan Lammertink, reported in Gallagher's 2013 book, found evidence — in the form of accounts by elderly residents in the bird's range who saw imperial woodpeckers decades earlier and who discussed their recollections with the researchers — that foresters working with Mexican logging companies in the 1950s told the local people that the woodpeckers were destroying valuable timber and encouraged the people to kill the birds. As part of this campaign, the foresters gave the local residents poison to smear on trees that the birds foraged on. Because groups of imperial woodpeckers tended to feed on a single huge, dead, old-growth pine tree for as long as two weeks, applying poison to such a tree would be an effective way to wipe out a group of up to one dozen of these huge woodpeckers — and, perhaps, even to kill off succeeding groups of the birds that might move into the area and be attracted to the same tree. Gallagher suspects that such a campaign of poisoning may be the key to the species' apparent catastrophic population crash in the 1950s, which has hitherto lacked a satisfactory explanation. A campaign of poisoning could well have killed whole groups of the bird in a short time. The premise of protecting valuable timber from the woodpeckers was, in fact, baseless. Imperial woodpeckers do not forage on or excavate nest or roosting holes in live, healthy trees.

In Gallagher's nonfiction account Imperial Dreams (2013), he discusses how difficult the search is for the imperial woodpecker due to its dangerous location. In Mexico's Sierra Madre Occidental, there are major marijuana and opium poppy-growing regions that are patrolled by armed guards. The drug cartels often kill anyone who comes too close to their crops.

A search of the multi-institution online specimen database VertNet reveals that only 144 physical specimens of the imperial woodpecker exist, including only three known complete skeletons. An overlooked woodpecker skeleton from the Natural History Museum at Tring appears to also belong to the species. The species is also known from a single amateur film from 1956 depicting one bird climbing, foraging and flying. The film has been restored and released by Cornell University. Gallagher's inspiration to search for the imperial woodpecker was this 1956 film, taken by dentist William Rhein, who made several trips to Mexico in search of the imperial woodpecker. This is the only known photographic record of the species.

The imperial woodpecker has been considered to be extinct by the Government of Mexico since 2001. However, its rediscovery or reintroduction would prompt immediate protection under the law.

== See also ==
- Ivory-billed woodpecker
- Pileated woodpecker
