= 1820 in birding and ornithology =

- Years in birding and ornithology: 1817 1818 1819 1820 1821 1822 1823
- Centuries: 18th century · 19th century · 20th century
- Decades: 1790s 1800s 1810s 1820s 1830s 1840s 1850s
- Years: 1817 1818 1819 1820 1821 1822 1823

This article provides a summary of significant events in 1820 in birding and ornithology. Notable occurrences in 1820 include the first description of the yellow-legged tinamou, and the commencement of ornithologist William Swainson's Zoological Illustrations, a work including illustrations of many birds.

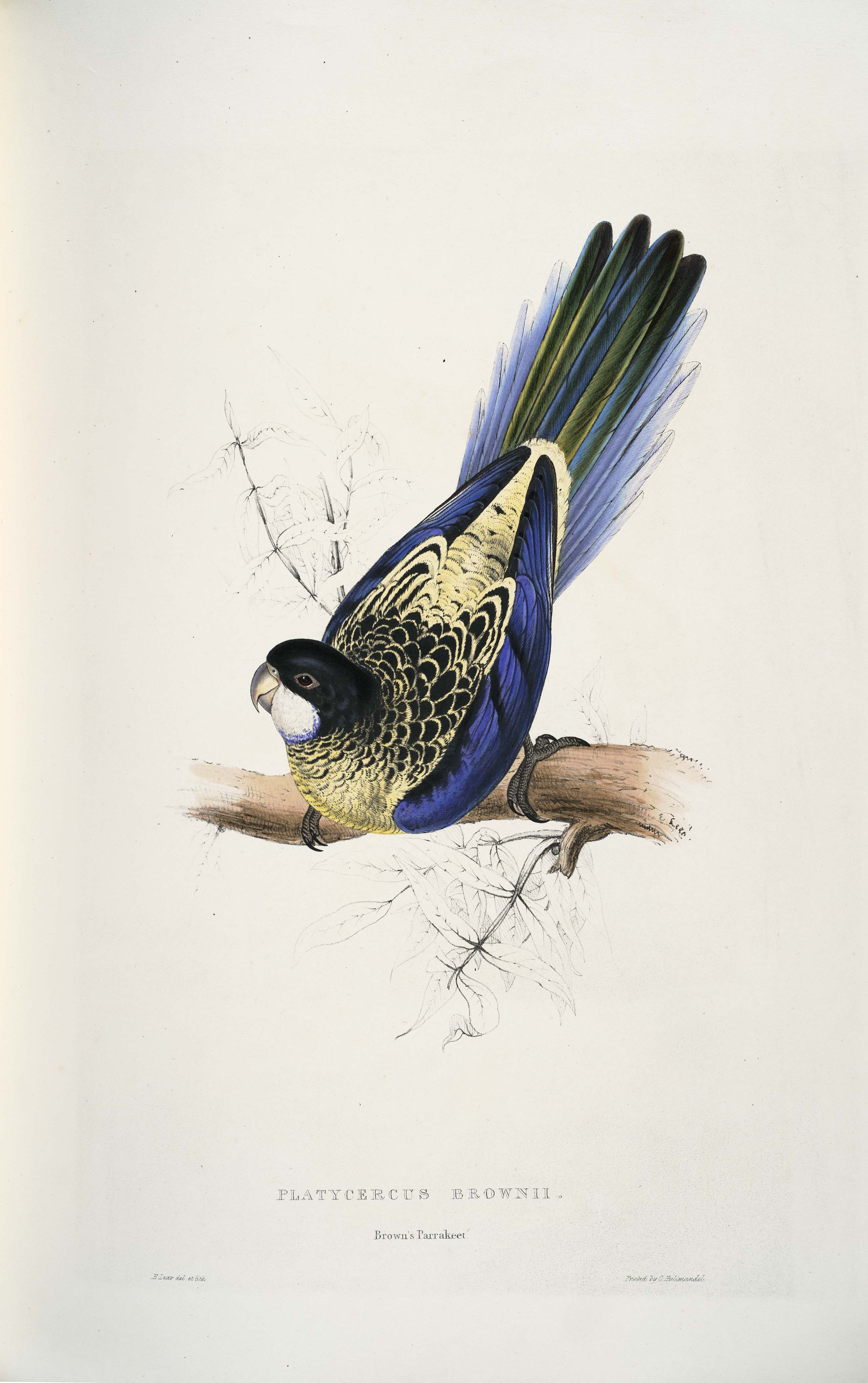
Northern rosella illustration by Edward Lear

== Events ==
- Heinrich Kuhl travels in Java collecting birds for the collections in Leiden
- Heinrich Kuhl publishes Conspectus Psittacorum. Cum specierum definitionibus, novarum descriptionibus, synonymis et circa patriam singularum naturalem adversariis, adjecto indice museorum, urbi earum artificiosae exuviae servantur. Bonn (also in Nova Acta Acad. Caes. Leop.-Carol. Nat. Cur. Vol.X). In this work he described many new parrot species. Among them are the red-capped parrot, the white-bellied parrot the Un-cape parrot, the vulturine parrot the short-tailed parrot the western rosella the blue-winged parrot the scaly-breasted lorikeet the scaly-headed parrot the golden-tailed parrotlet the northern rosella the black-collared lovebird and the vinaceous-breasted amazon
- Louis Pierre Vieillot undertakes the continuation of Tableau encyclopédique et méthodique, commenced by Pierre Joseph Bonnaterre in 1790
- Prince Maximilian of Wied-Neuwied describes the yellow-legged tinamou
- Leach's storm petrel named after William Elford Leach by Coenraad Jacob Temminck without Temminck being aware that it had previously been described by Vieillot
- Short-toed treecreeper named by Christian Ludwig Brehm
- William Swainson commences Zoological Illustrations (1820–23)
- Coenraad Jacob Temminck commences Nouveau recueil de planches coloriées d'oiseaux. New species described in this work in 1820 include the rufous-vented ground cuckoo, the cinereous antshrike, the northern white-faced owl, the olivaceous flatbill, the streaky-breasted honeyeater, Verreaux's eagle-owl and the Timor blue flycatcher
- Rijksmuseum van Natuurlijke Historie established

== Deaths ==
- 19 June - Joseph Banks (born 1743)
- 9 August - Anders Sparrman (born 1748)
