= 1816 in birding and ornithology =

- Years in birding and ornithology: 1813 1814 1815 1816 1817 1818 1819
- Centuries: 18th century · 19th century · 20th century
- Decades: 1780s 1790s 1800s 1810s 1820s 1830s 1840s
- Years: 1813 1814 1815 1816 1817 1818 1819

- 1816–1830 Dictionnaire des sciences naturelles, edited and published from 1816 to 1830 by F. G. Levrault commenced Charles Dumont de Sainte-Croix was a notable ornithological contributor.
- Duchesse de Berry, daughter-in-law of King Charles X of France, extends her patronage to the illustrator Pancrace Bessa
- Louis Pierre Vieillot publishes the description of Milvago chimachima, the yellow-headed caracara in the first issue of Nouveau dictionnaire d'histoire naturelle, appliquée aux arts, à l'agriculture, à l'économie rurale et domestique, à la médecine. Other birds described by Vieillot in the same issue include the black-chested buzzard-eagle, the Mindanao wrinkled hornbill, the speckled teal the ringed teal and the South American snipe
- William Swainson accompanies the explorer Henry Koster to Brazil. He returned to England in 1818 about 760 bird skins.
- Pictou Academy founded. The institute had a natural history museum which was later (1833) admired by John James Audubon
- French Academy of Sciences becomes autonomous.
- Carl Ludwig Koch publishes System der baierischen Zoologie.
- HMS Congo expedition.
