= 1817 in birding and ornithology =

- Years in birding and ornithology: 1814 1815 1816 1817 1818 1819 1820
- Centuries: 18th century · 19th century · 20th century
- Decades: 1780s 1790s 1800s 1810s 1820s 1830s 1840s
- Years: 1814 1815 1816 1817 1818 1819 1820

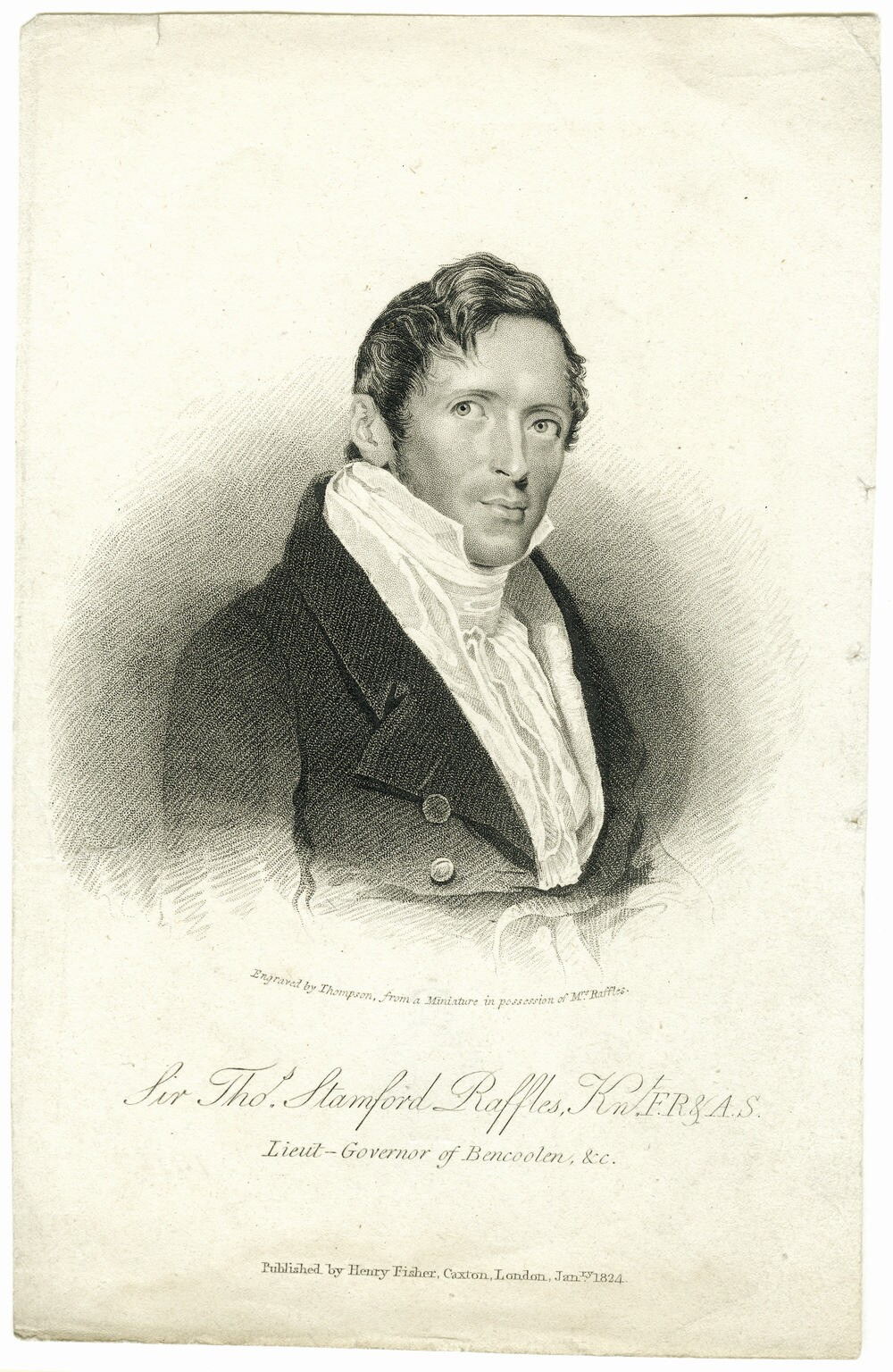
Stamford Raffles

- Closure of Edward Donovan s London Museum and Institute of Natural History founded in 1807.
- Emperor Franz II of Austria finances an expedition to Brazil on the occasion of the wedding of his daughter Archduchess Leopoldina to the Portuguese crown prince, Dom Pedro of Alcantara Johann Natterer was the zoologist on the expedition and was accompanied by other naturalists including Johann Baptist von Spix and Carl Friedrich Philipp von Martius.
- Death of Nikolaus Joseph von Jacquin
- Stamford Raffles in The History of Java states that at this date 170 bird species were known from Java and specimens were in the museum of the East India Company
- Philipp Jakob Cretzschmar founds the Senckenberg Natural History Society.

Ongoing events

- Louis Pierre Vieillot publishes the description of the red-throated bee-eater in the first issue of Nouveau dictionnaire d'histoire naturelle, appliquée aux arts, à l'agriculture, à l'économie rurale et domestique, à la médecine . Other birds described by Vieillot in this work in 1817 include the tropical screech-owl, the white-throated bee-eater, the black-faced woodswallow, the white-flanked antwren and the collared sparrowhawk.
