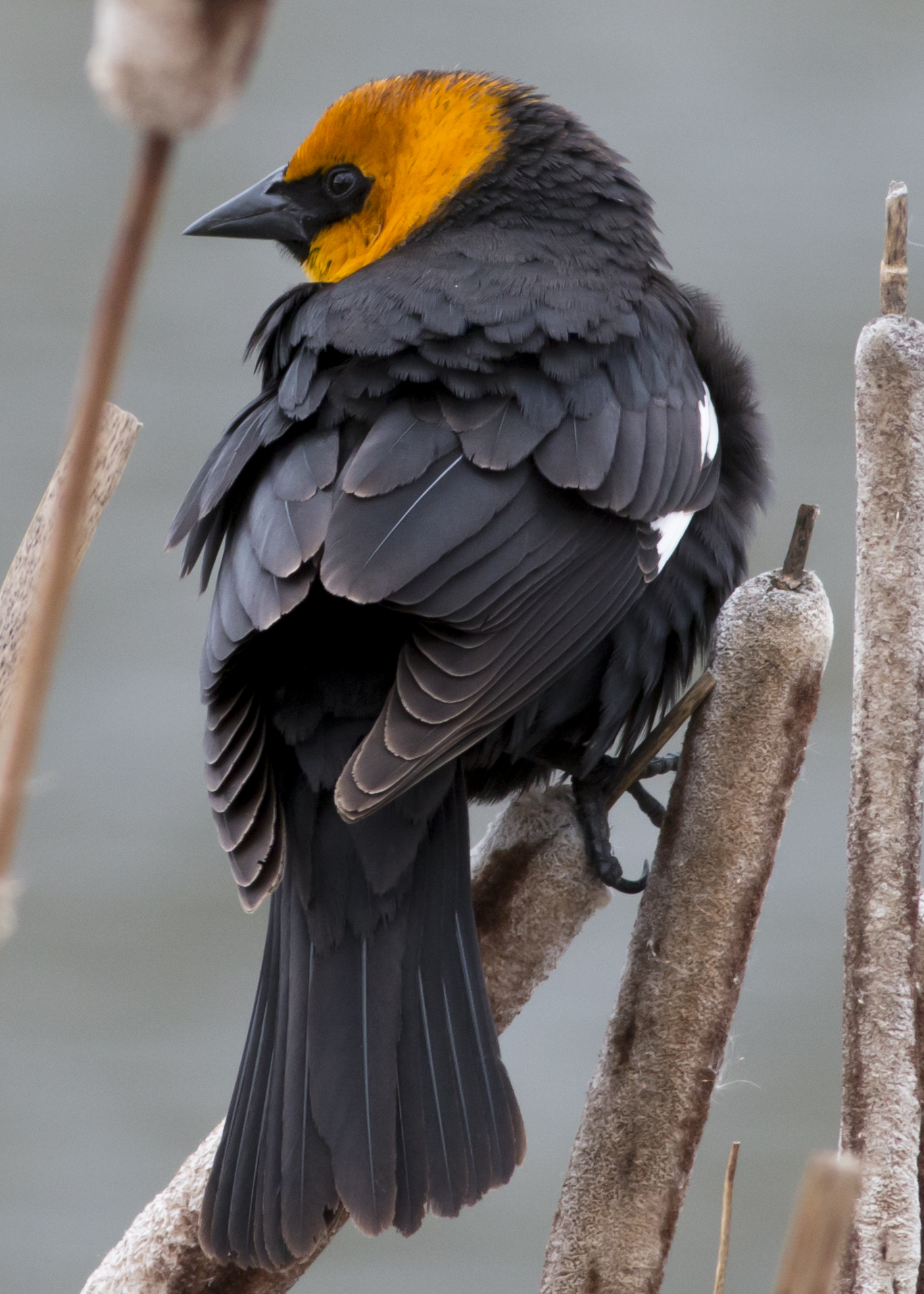
- Male in British Columbia, Canada

Conservation status
- Least Concern (IUCN 3.1)

Scientific classification
- Kingdom: Animalia
- Phylum: Chordata
- Class: Aves
- Order: Passeriformes
- Family: Icteridae
- Genus: Xanthocephalus; Bonaparte, 1850
- Species: X. xanthocephalus

Binomial name
- Xanthocephalus xanthocephalus (Bonaparte, 1826)
- Range of X. xanthocephalus Breeding range Wintering range Year-round range

= Yellow-headed blackbird =

Yellow-headed blackbird Temporal range: Late Pleistocene–present

Species of bird

The yellow-headed blackbird (Xanthocephalus xanthocephalus) is a medium-sized blackbird with a yellow head.

It is the only member of the genus Xanthocephalus. Their scientific name derives from the Greek word for yellow, xanthous, and the word for head, cephalus.

== Description ==
Yellow-headed blackbirds are relatively large blackbirds with large, yellow heads. They measure 8.3–10.2 in (21–26 cm) in length, with a wingspan of 16.5–17.3 in (42–44 cm) and a weight of 1.6–3.5 oz (44–100 g).

Adults have a pointed bill. The adult male is mainly black with a yellow head and breast; they have a white wing patch sometimes only visible in flight. The adult female is mainly brown with a dull yellow throat and breast. Immature members of both sexes are brown with duller yellow plumage compared to adult males. Immature males also have some white patches on the wing. Both sexes resemble the respective sexes of the smaller yellow-hooded blackbird of South America.

== Behavior and ecology ==
=== Migration, habitat, and breeding ===
These birds migrate in the winter to the southwestern United States and Mexico. They often migrate in huge flocks with other species of birds. The only regions of the United States where these blackbirds are permanent residents are the San Joaquin Valley and the Lower Colorado River Valley of Arizona and California. It is an extremely rare vagrant to western Europe, with some records suspected to refer to escapes from captivity. When migrating, males and females travel separately. Males typically arrive at the breeding marshes 2–3 weeks before females during spring migration. Research suggests that females choose breeding sites based on the reproductive success (number of young per breeding female) of the site in previous years.

The breeding habitat of the yellow-headed blackbird are marshes in North America (mainly west of the Great Lakes), particularly in plants such as cattails (genus Typha), bulrush (genus Scirpus), and common reeds (genus Phragmites). The nest is built with and attached to marsh vegetation and is constructed over open water. They nest in colonies, often sharing their habitat closely with the red-winged blackbird (Agelaius phoeniceus). During the breeding and nesting season the males are very territorial and spend much of their time perched on reed stalks and displaying or chasing off intruders.

=== Food ===
These birds eat seeds for the majority of the year and insects throughout the summer months. They forage in marshes, fields, or on the ground, sometimes catching insects in flight. Sunflowers are fairly popular amongst yellow-headed blackbirds in the Northern Great Plains, with a study indicating that males eat more sunflower than grains and females more grains than sunflower. Some methods of gathering food involve flipping over stones, catching insects from the top of water, and foraging. Foraging methods take place in uplands, with the flock taking a "rolling" formation in which birds fly from the back to the front of the flock to feed. Female yellow-headed blackbirds primarily feed their newly-hatched young insects from the order Odonata, which includes dragonflies and damselflies. Outside the nesting period, they often feed in flocks, often with related species.

=== Songs and calls ===
This bird's song resembles the grating of a rusty hinge. Male yellow-headed blackbirds have been observed to have two types of songs, an "accent song" and a "buzz song". The "buzz songs'' have much higher pitch than the accent song, and thus do not echo as well in the dense marshes they live in. For that reason, buzzing songs are typically done when communicating closer whereas accent songs are done to communicate with birds further in the marshes. Female birds have a song that is described to be similar to the male "buzz song", consisting of harsh grating or buzz sounds. Both sexes are also found to elicit harsh calling notes.

=== Natural threats ===
Yellow‐headed blackbirds have been found to be sensitive to nest predation risk, for example by marsh wrens (Cistothorus palustris), and alter their nest attendance behavior accordingly.

Raptors occasionally prey on yellow-headed blackbird flocks. For example, media outlets reported that on February 7, 2022, a flock of yellow-headed blackbirds migrating to Chihuahua, Mexico, were seen dropping dead in the early morning. According to experts, it is most likely that the birds were killed due to being flushed from above as a result of a predatory bird (presumably a raptor) chasing them, which caused some of them to fly into each other and crash into the ground and nearby buildings.

== Conservation ==
Because yellow-headed blackbirds typically reside in wetlands, their population numbers depend on the conditions of the wetlands in which they reside. For instance, drainage projects, herbicides/pesticides, and other crop protection methods have impacts on the health of wetlands, and consequently, cause the bird population to fluctuate in number. Currently, yellow-headed blackbird numbers are stable and will likely remain that way in the long term.

== Gallery ==
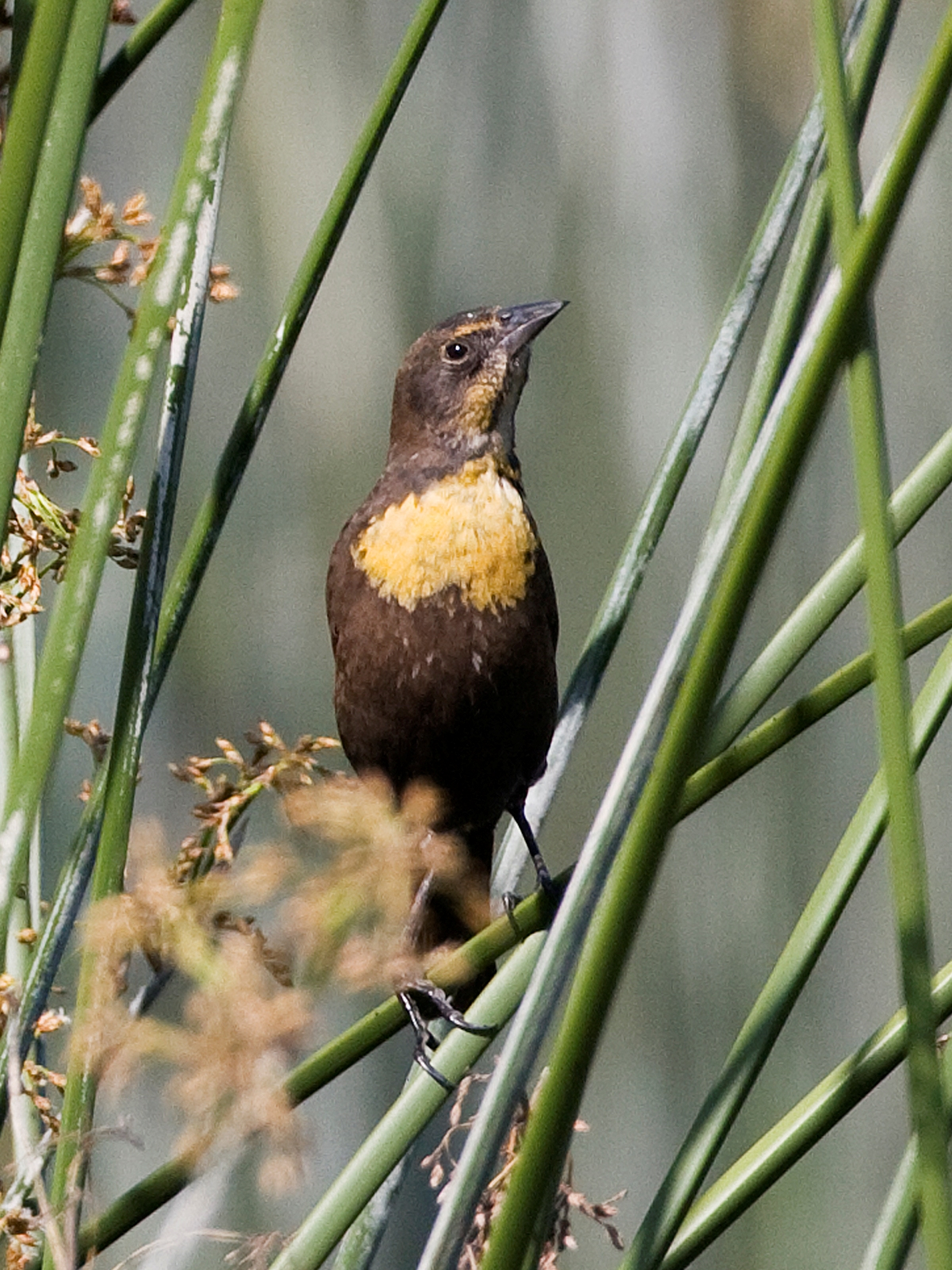
Female

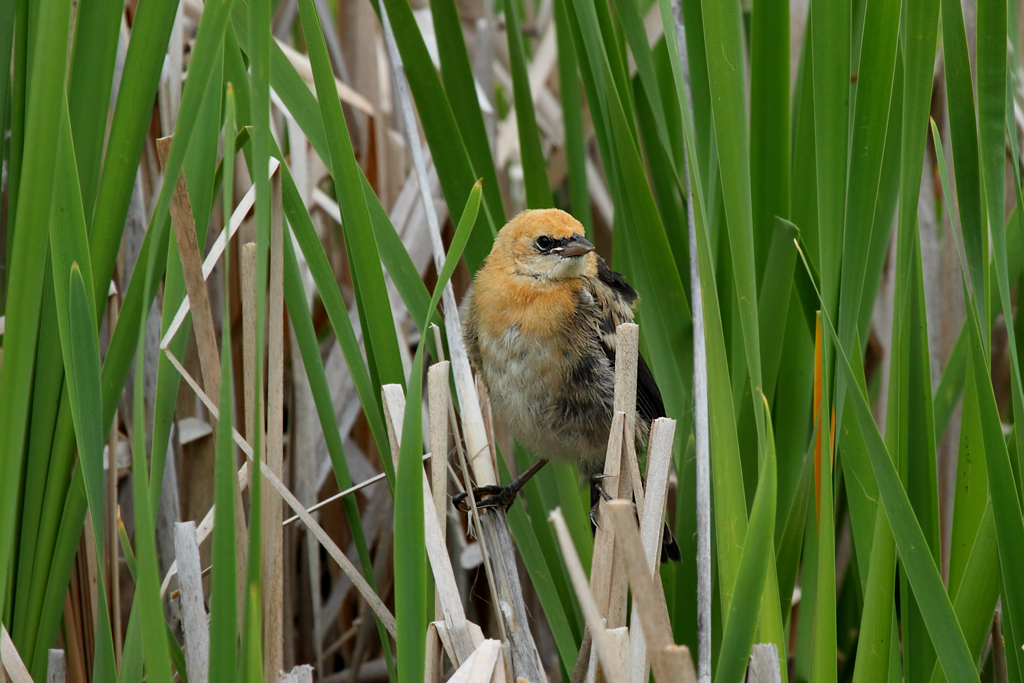
Juvenile

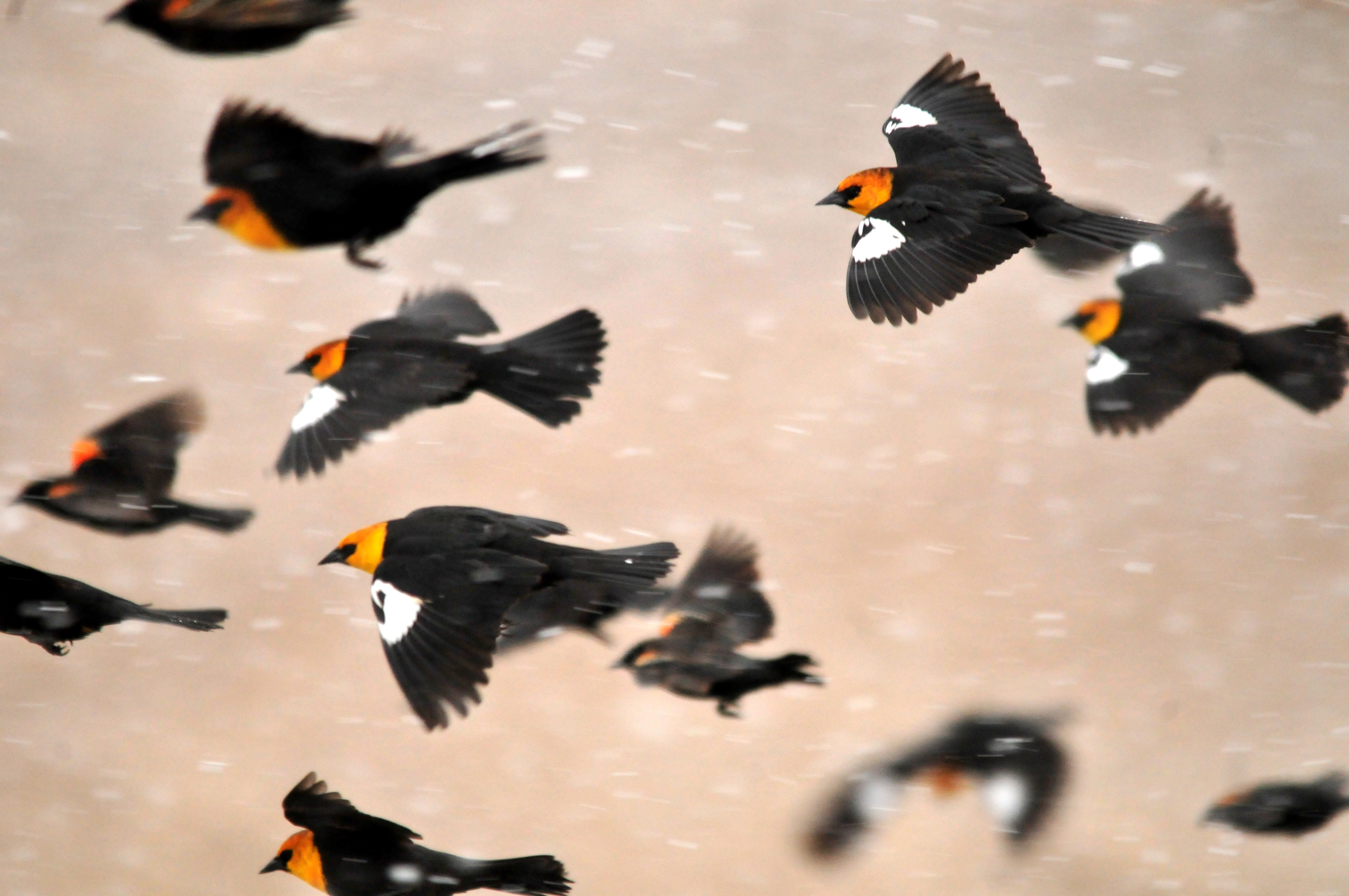
Yellow-headed blackbirds in flight

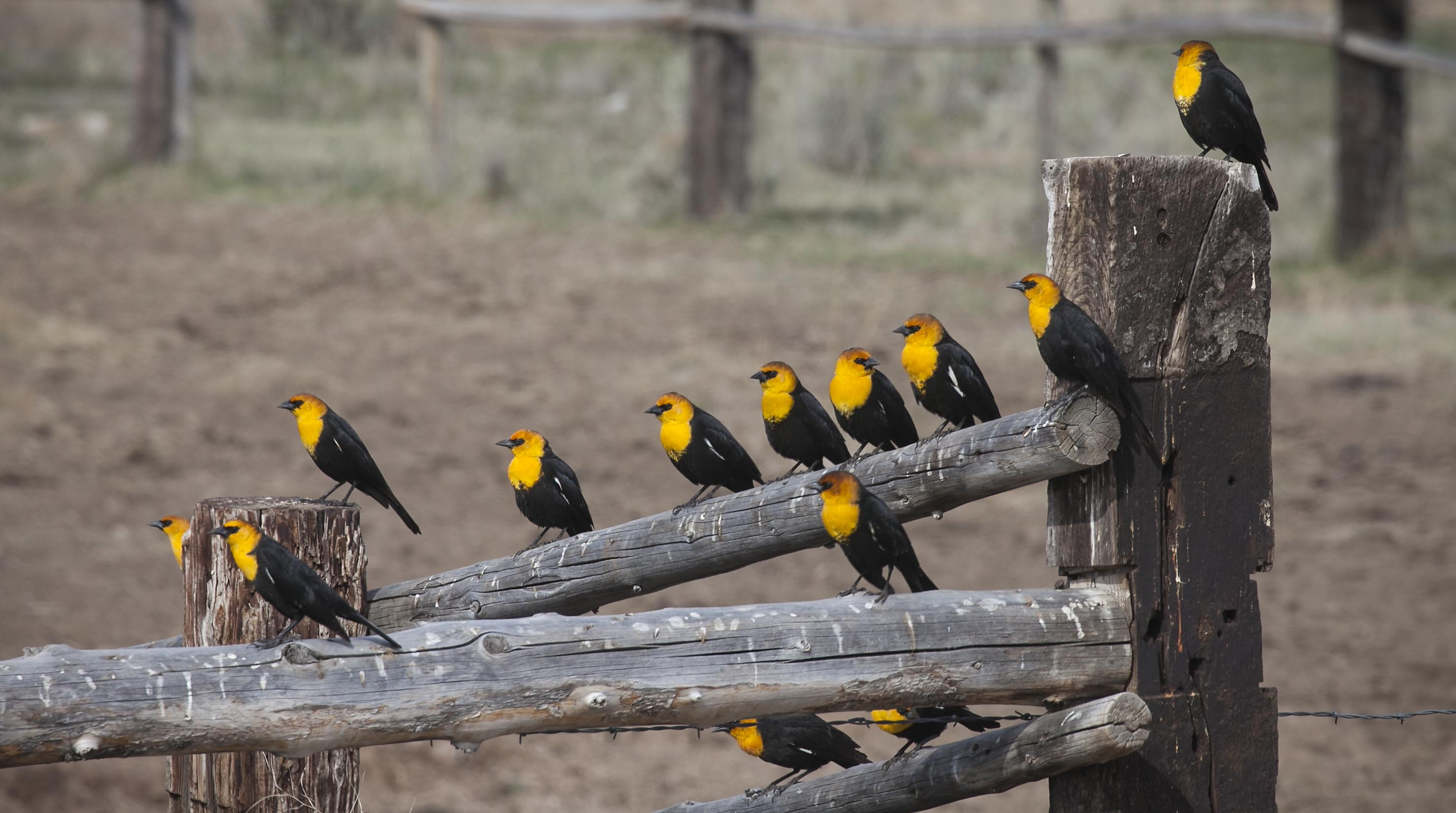
Group of yellow-headed blackbirds in Wyoming

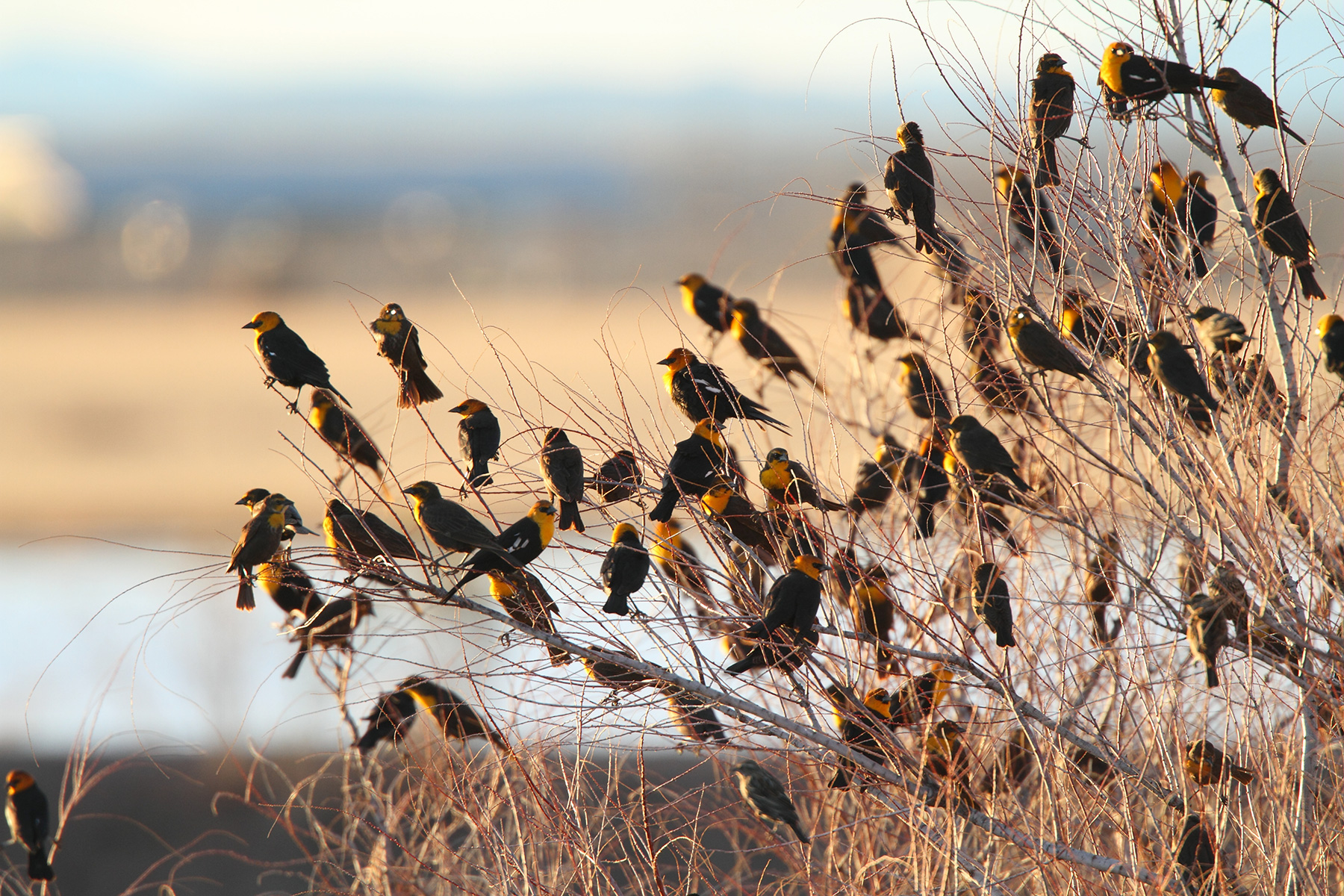
Roosting flock, Whitewater Draw, Arizona

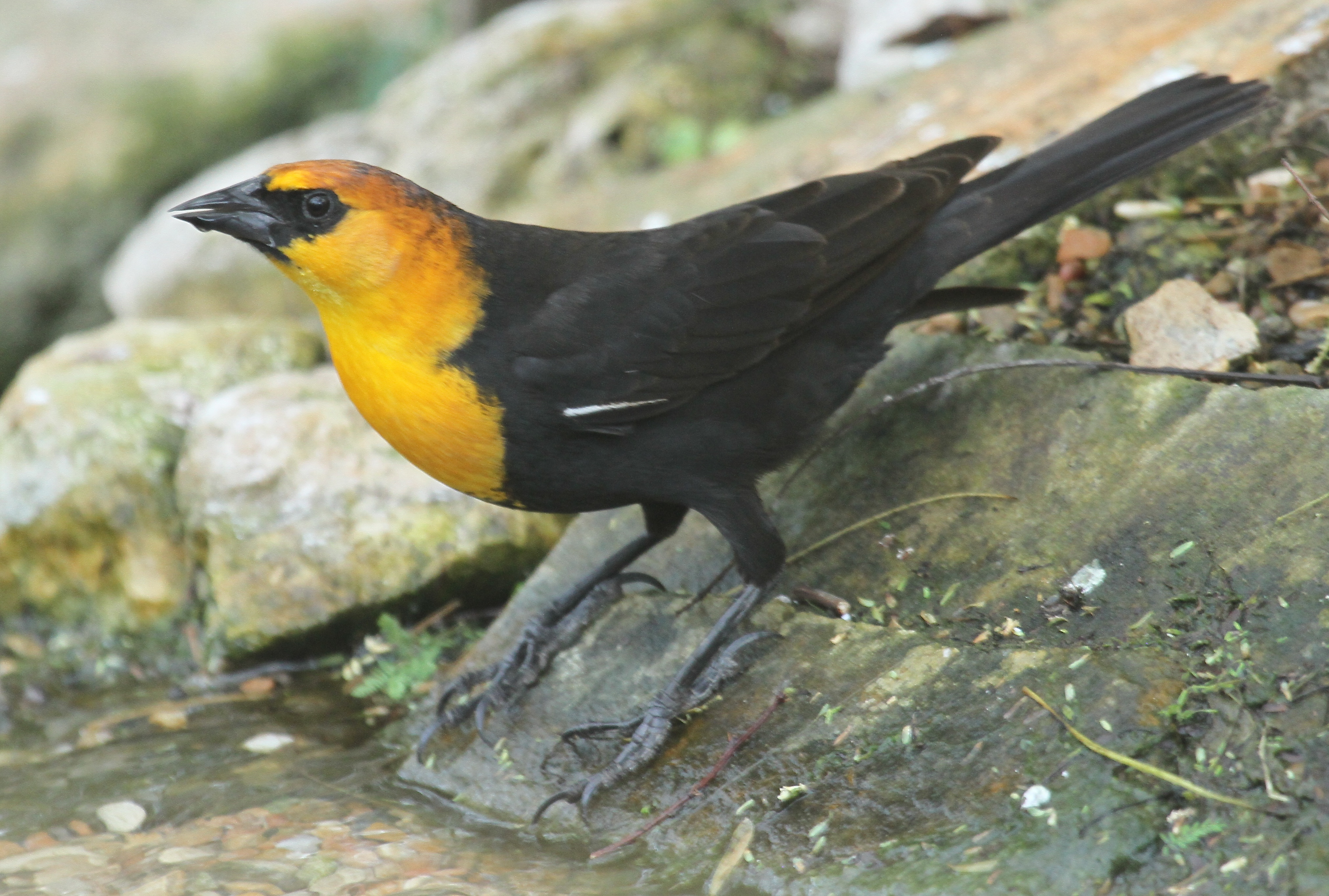
South Padre Island, Texas
