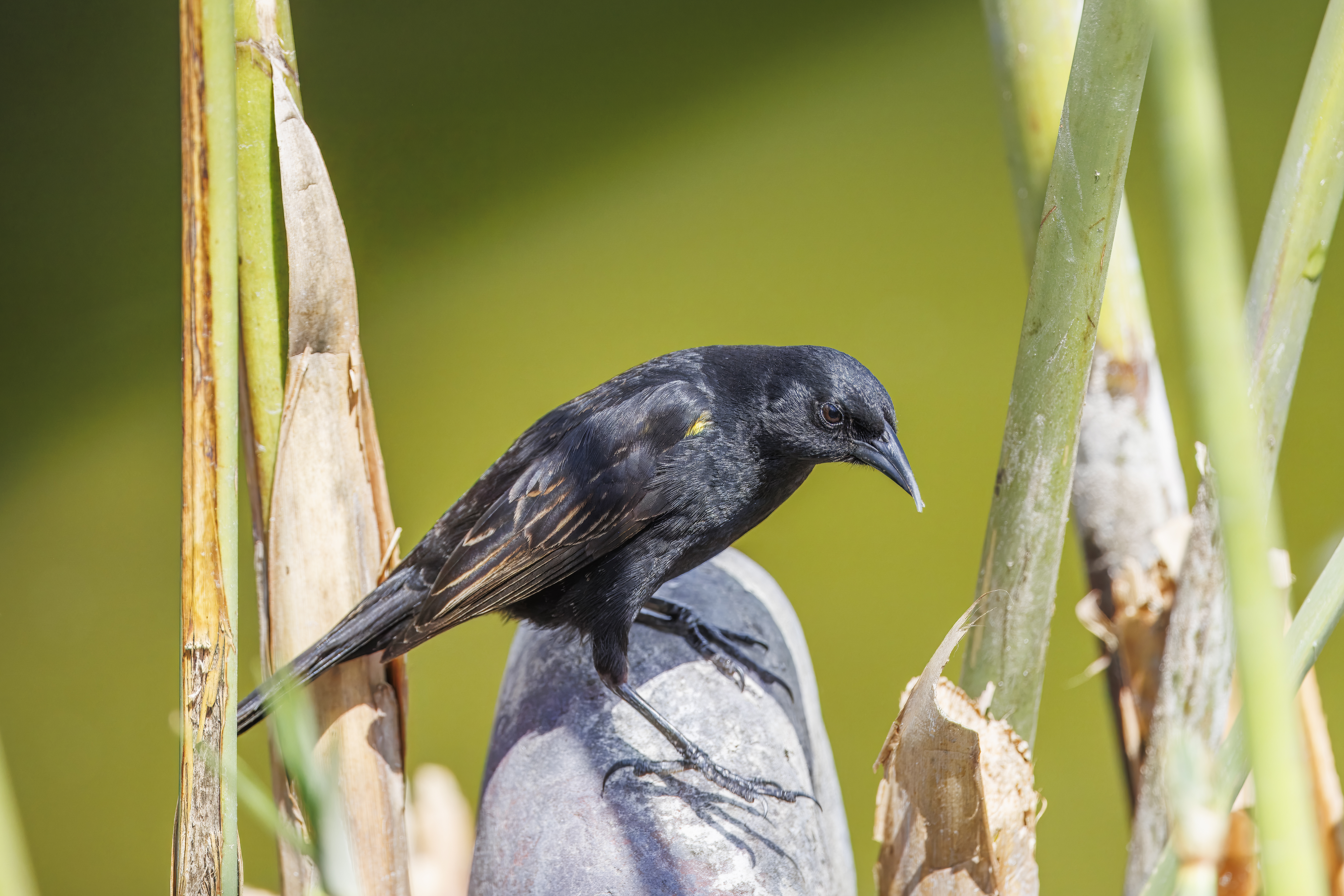
- Male
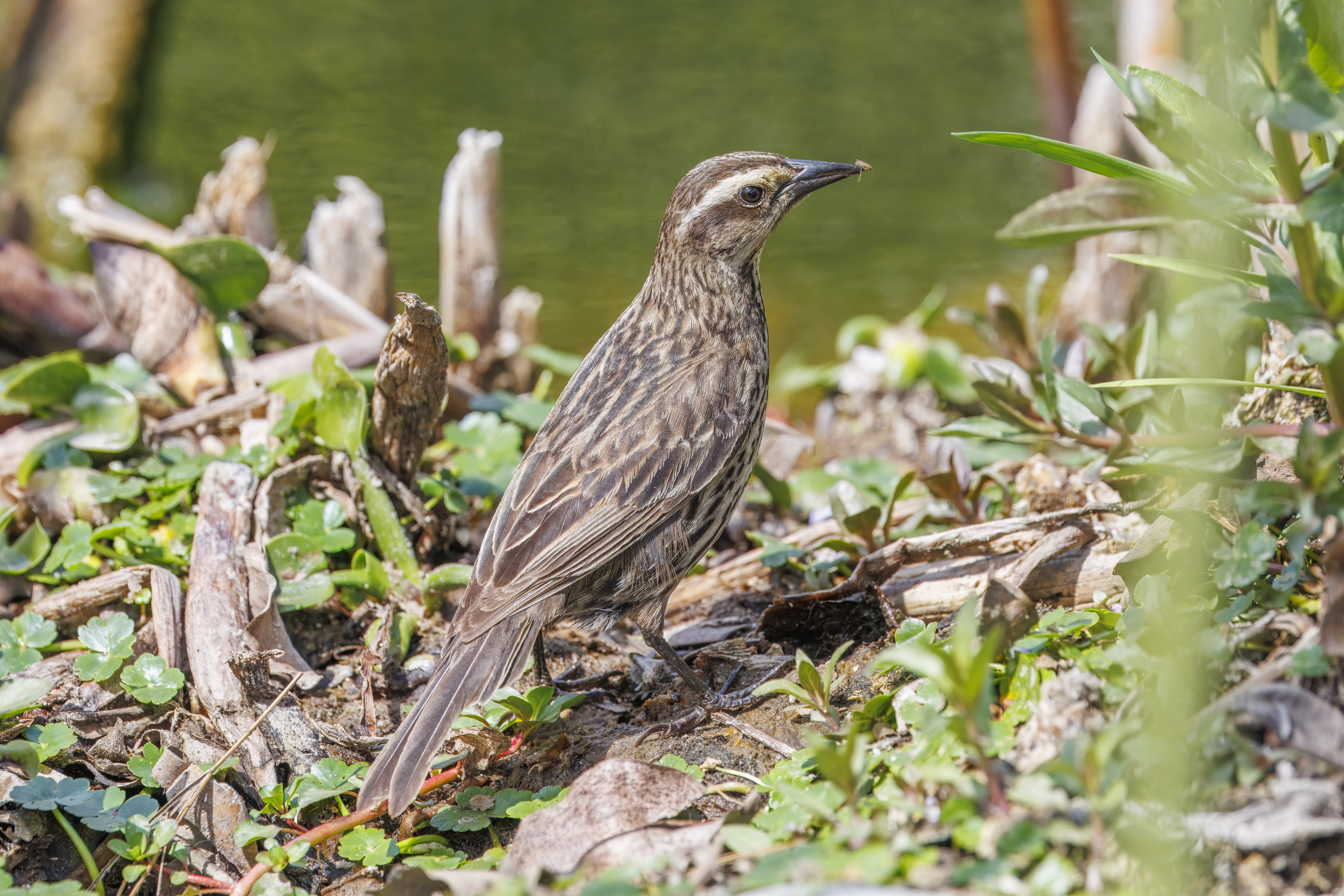
- Female both in Santiago, Chile

Conservation status
- Least Concern (IUCN 3.1)

Scientific classification
- Kingdom: Animalia
- Phylum: Chordata
- Class: Aves
- Order: Passeriformes
- Family: Icteridae
- Genus: Agelasticus
- Species: A. thilius

Binomial name
- Agelasticus thilius (Molina, 1782)

= Yellow-winged blackbird =

Species of bird

The yellow-winged blackbird (Agelasticus thilius) is a species of bird in the family Icteridae, the oropendolas, New World orioles, and New World blackbirds. It is found in Argentina, Bolivia, Brazil, Chile, Paraguay, Peru, and Uruguay.

== Taxonomy and systematics ==
The yellow-winged blackbird was formally described in 1782 with the binomial Turdus Thilius [sic]. Genus Agelasticus had been erected in 1851 and in 1855 Turdus thilius was designated as its type species and renamed Agelasticus thilius. However, A. thilius was later assigned at different times to genera Agelaius and Chrysomus. By the 1990s those two genera were beginning to be recognized as polyphyletic, and early in the twenty-first century Agelasticus was resurrected for the yellow-winged blackbird and two other species.

The yellow-winged blackbird has three subspecies, the nominate A. t. thilius (Molina, 1782), A. t. alticola (Todd, 1932), and A. t. petersii (Laubmann, 1934).

== Description ==
Male yellow-winged blackbirds average 17.9 cm (7.0 in) long. Males weigh an average of 33.5 g (1.2 oz) and females average about 29 g (1.0 oz). The species is sexually dimorphic. Adult males of the nominate subspecies are almost entirely black. Their marginal, lesser upperwing, and underwing coverts are yellow; the first two give the species its English name. Females have a dark brown crown, a wide buff supercilium, and dark brown ear coverts. The rest of their head and their upperparts are brown with wide dusky streaks and some chestnut edges on the lower scapulars and lower back. Their wing feathers are mostly dark brown with paler edges and some chestnut on the inner greater coverts; the marginal coverts have some yellow that is seldom visible. Their tail is blackish with narrow chestnut feather edges. Their underparts are light buff-brown with darker streaks except on the chin and upper throat. Both sexes have a brown iris, a black bill, and black legs and feet. Both sexes of subspecies A. t. petersii have the same plumage as the nominate but are smaller. A. t. alticola is larger than the nominate. Males are like the nominate. Females are darker with more streaking. They have a thin gray supercilium or none at all and more yellow on the upperwing coverts that sometimes is enough to form an epaulet like the male's.

== Distribution and habitat ==
The yellow-winged blackbird has a disjunct distribution. Each subspecies is separate from the others and A. t. petersii has two populations. The subspecies are found thus:

- A. t. alticola: from Cuzco and Puno departments in southwestern Peru south into western Bolivia's La Paz, Cochabamba, and Oruro departments
- A. t. thilius: Chile from the Atacama Region south to Los Lagos Region (but see below)
- A. t. petersii (main range): Brazil coastally from Paraná state south and in western Rio Grande do Sul, Uruguay, and Argentina east of the high Andes as far south as Chubut Province (but see below)
- A. t. petersii (small range): southeastern Chile's Aysén and Magallanes regions and southern Argentina's Santa Cruz Province

Some sources include southwestern Argentina in the range of A. t. thilius. Several sources include Paraguay in the main range of A. t. petersii. However, others do not, and the South American Classification Committee places it in that country only as a vagrant. One source states that there are a few records of A. t. petersii in southern Bolivia but others do not include that country in the subspecies' range.

The yellow-winged blackbird primarily inhabits marshes and other wetlands and their associated reed beds but also occurs in nearby grasslands and croplands. Subspecies A. t. alticola is found in the wetlands of Lake Titicaca and other Andean lakes. In elevation A. t. petersii reaches 2,300 m (7,500 ft). In Peru A. t. alticola ranges between 3,300 and 4,200 m (10,800 and 13,800 ft).

== Behavior ==
=== Movement ===
Sources do not agree on the migratory behavior of the yellow-winged blackbird and some are inconsistent within themselves. The IUCN's map shows A. t. alticola, A. t. thilius, and the small population of A. t. petersii as year-round residents. It shows the main population of A. t. petersii in far northern Argentina and in Paraguay only during the non-breeding season and as a year-round resident in the rest of its range. However, its text states that the species is resident in every country of its range except Uruguay, where it is listed as only breeding. The IOC does not include Paraguay in the species' range, lists the species as breeding in every other country, and does not list it as solely non-breeding in any country. The Cornell Lab of Ornithology's Birds of the World states that A. t. alticola is probably resident in Peru and Bolivia but may make some elevational movements. Its map shows A. t. thilius as a year-round resident and its text is silent on any movement. It states that A. t. petersii is resident in Brazil and Uruguay. It further says that the population of petersii in Argentina from southern Mendoza Province south migrates north after breeding. It says that the subspecies occurs in far northeastern Argentina and Paraguay mostly or entirely as a non-breeder and that its northern limit is not well understood. Its map mirrors the text's non-breeding range but does not distinguish the southern breeding-only range. This article's map shows all subspecies as year-round residents; it is stated as adapted from Jaramillo and Burke's New World Blackbirds.

=== Feeding ===
The yellow-winged blackbird feeds primarily on aquatic insects and seeds and also includes other invertebrates like spiders, crustaceans, and mollusks in its diet. It feeds mostly in marshes but also in nearby grass and cultivated fields. In one study it apparently fed only on insects but not seeds in a crop of grass. It forages in flocks.

=== Breeding ===
The yellow-winged blackbird's breeding season has not been fully defined but includes October to December in Argentina and Chile and may start as early as July. It is a colonial breeder and apparently monogamous. It primarily breeds in marshes but sometimes in dense low vegetation in drier locations near them. The female builds the cup nest from marsh vegetation. Most known nests were in beds of the sedge Schoenoplectus californicus but some were in cattails and Phragmites reeds. The clutch is two to four eggs that are pale buffish white with darker markings. The female alone incubates, for 12 to 13 days. Fledging occurs 10 to 12 days after hatch and both parents provision nestlings. The shiny cowbird (M. bonariensis) is a common brood parasite.

=== Vocalization ===
The yellow-winged blackbird's song varies among and within the subspecies. Males of the nominate subspecies and A. t. petersii sing variable "trills of 3–7 notes..., a whistled warble tréé-o-lay (or séé-you-there), and a similar warble ending with a strong nasal or buzzing tone (tree-o-láááy). The song of A. t. alticola is described as similar but less nasal. Both sexes make a sharp chep call.

== Status ==
The IUCN has assessed the yellow-winged blackbird as being of Least Concern. It has an extremely large range; its population size is not known but is believed to be stable. No immediate threats have been identified. It is considered "[r]ather common over most of its range, becoming naturally rarer or local toward the subtropics". It is fairly common to common in Peru and "frequent to uncommon" in Brazil. It occurs in many national parks and other protected areas.
