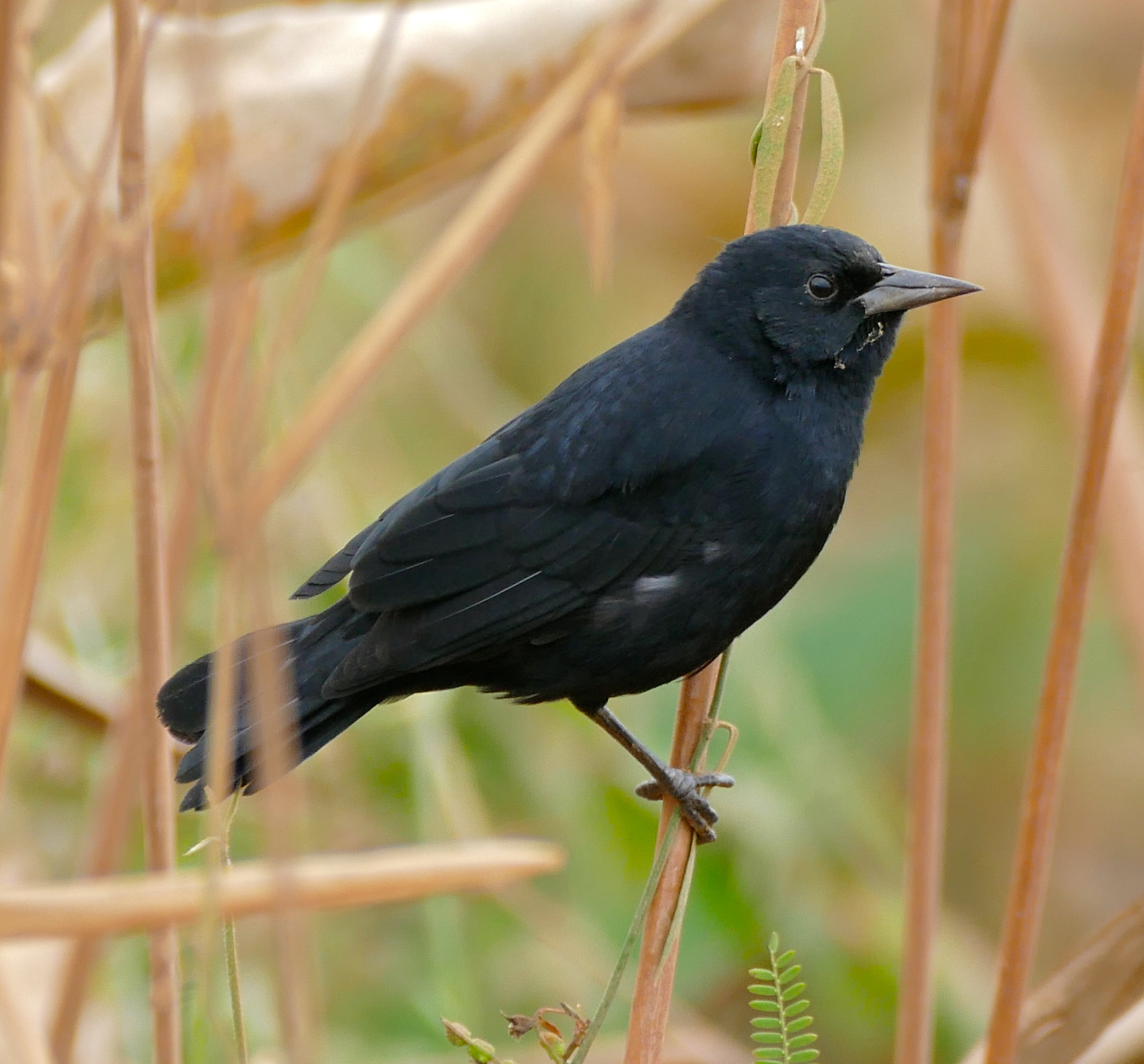
- Male A. c. cyanopus

Conservation status
- Least Concern (IUCN 3.1)

Scientific classification
- Kingdom: Animalia
- Phylum: Chordata
- Class: Aves
- Order: Passeriformes
- Family: Icteridae
- Genus: Agelasticus
- Species: A. cyanopus

Binomial name
- Agelasticus cyanopus (Vieillot, 1819)

Synonyms
- See text

= Unicolored blackbird =

Species of bird

The unicolored blackbird (Agelasticus cyanopus) is a species of bird in the family Icteridae, the oropendolas, New World orioles, and New World blackbirds. It is found in Argentina, Bolivia, Brazil, Paraguay, Uruguay, and as a vagrant in Peru.

== Taxonomy and systematics ==
The unicolored blackbird was formally described in 1819 with the binomial Agelaius cyanopus. The species was later assigned to genus Chrysomus. By the 1990s Agelaius and Chrysomus were beginning to be recognized as polyphyletic, and early in the twenty-first century Agelasticus, which had been erected in 1851, was resurrected for the unicolored blackbird and two other species.

The unicolored blackbird's further taxonomy is unsettled. The IOC, AviList, and BirdLife International's Handbook of the Birds of the World recognize these four subspecies:

- A. c. xenicus (Parkes, 1966)
- A. c. atroolivaceus (Wied-Neuwied, M, 1831)
- A. c. beniensis (Parkes, 1966)
- A. c. cyanopus (Vieillot, 1819)

However, as of late 2025 the Clements taxonomy does not recognize A. c. beniensis and treats A. c. xenicus by its earlier binomial A. c. unicolor (Swainson, 1838).

The females have notably different plumage and some authors have suggested that one or more of the subspecies deserve full species rank. Clements recognizes some distinction within the species by calling A. c. cyanopus the "unicolored blackbird (yellow-breasted)" and grouping its A. c. unicolor and A. c. atroolivaceus as the "unicolored blackbird (Azara's)".

During at least the 1960s what was then Agelaius cyanopus was called "Azara's marsh blackbird".

This article follows the four-subspecies model.

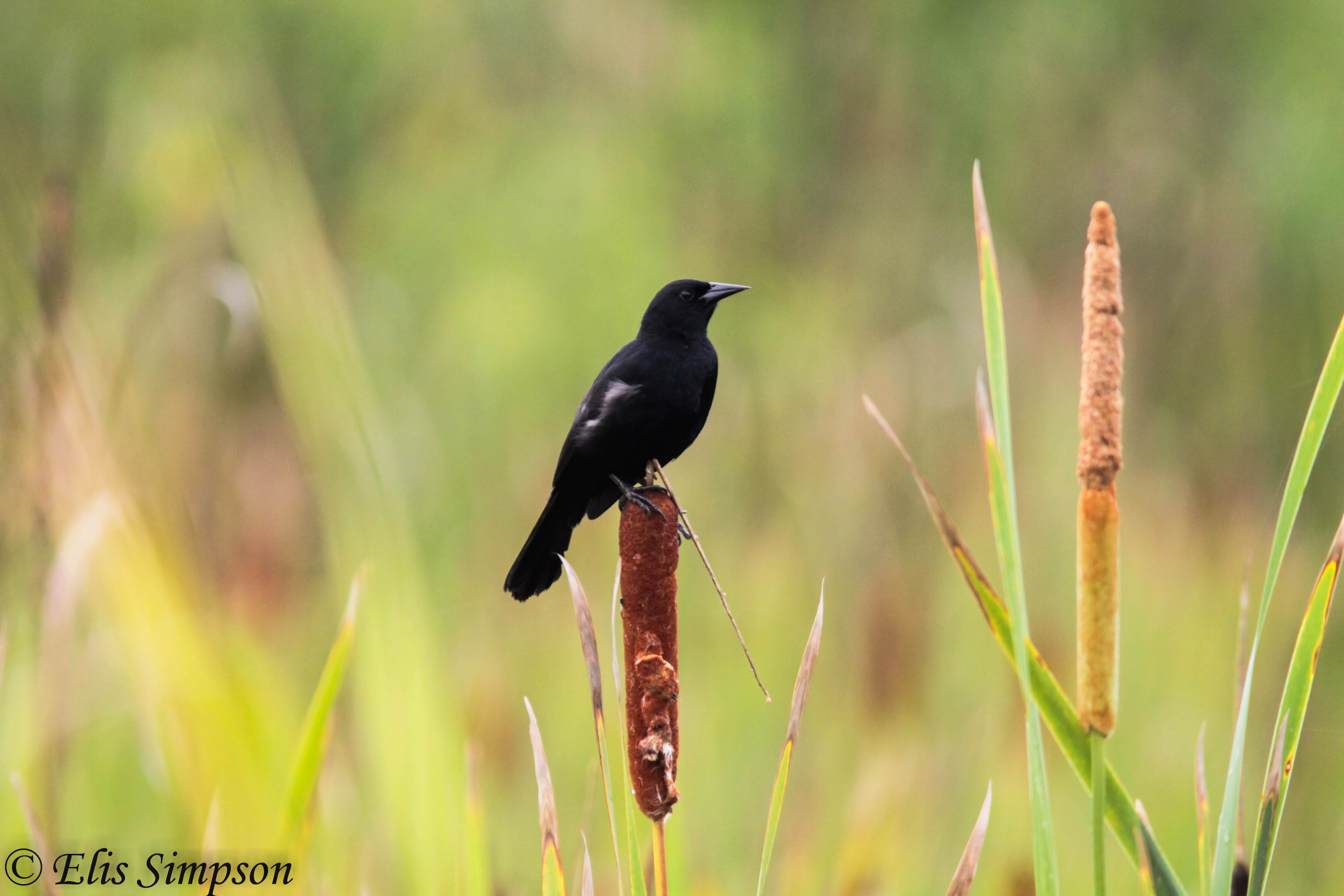
Male A. c. atroolivaceus

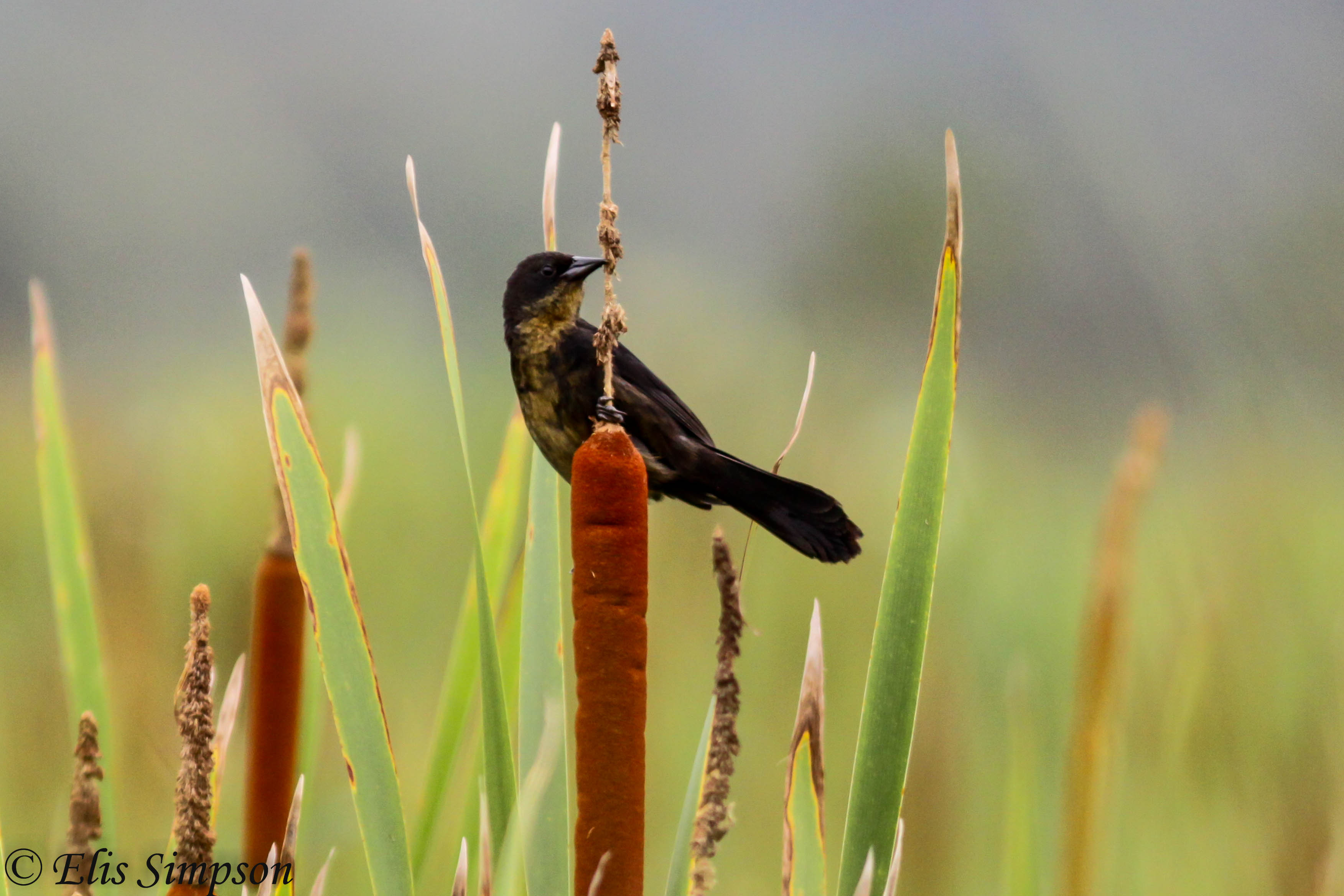
Female A. c. atroolivaceus

== Description ==
The unicolored blackbird is about 18 to 21 cm (7.1 to 8.3 in) long. Males weigh an average of 40.6 g (1.4 oz) and females average 37.4 g (1.3 oz). The species is sexually dimorphic. Adult males of all four subspecies are entirely black with a faint bluish gloss. Adult females of the nominate subspecies A. c. cyanopus have a brown crown, a thin yellowish supercilium, and blackish ear coverts. Their upperparts are brown with heavy black streaks. Their upperwing is brownish with rufous edges on most feathers. Their tail is blackish. Their underparts are mostly pale yellow with dusky streaks on the flanks and sometimes on the breast. Their underwing coverts are pale yellow. Juveniles are similar to adult females but are more buffy yellow underparts and have heavier streaking on both the upper- and underparts.

Females of subspecies A. c. atroolivaceus are overall much darker than the nominate. Their underparts are dark brownish olive with a yellowish wash. Females of subspecies A. c. beniensis have darker upperparts than the nominate and their underparts are intermediate between those of the nominate and atroolivaceus. Females of A. c. xenicus have an olive-washed blackish head, mantle, and breast and a dark olive-yellow belly.

Both sexes of all subspecies have a dark brown iris and black legs and feet. Adult males have a black bill; adult females often have much bluish gray to pale horn on the mandible.

== Distribution and habitat ==
The unicolored blackbird has a disjunct distribution; sources differ significantly in the ranges of the subspecies. The article's map approximates the range descriptions of the Cornell Lab of Ornithology's Birds of the World.

- A. c. atroolivaceus: coastal eastern Brazil from Espírito Santo south to Paraná or "eastern Brazil, from Minas Gerais and southwestern Bahia southward to coastal southeastern Brazil (Espírito Santo to São Paulo)"
- A. c. cyanopus: "eastern Bolivia and southwestern Brazil (western Mato Grosso and Mato Grosso do Sul) to Paraguay and northern Argentina" or "eastern Bolivia and south-central Brazil to Paraguay, northern Argentina, and Uruguay"
- A. c. unicolor (A. c. xenicus): Amapá, northeastern Pará, and northern Maranhão in northeastern Brazil; possibly French Guiana or "northeastern Brazil (Amapá to Pará and northwestern Maranhão) southward through central Brazil to northwestern Paraná and western São Paulo"
- A. c. beniensis: northeastern Bolivia

According to AviList A. c. atroolivaceus and A. c. xenicus intergrade in São Paulo. The South American Classification Committee has confirmed records of the species in Peru and lists it as a vagrant there.

The unicolored blackbird primarily inhabits marshes and other wetlands as long as they have abundant floating (e.g. Pistia water-cabbage and Lemna duckweed) and emergent (e.g. Cyperus sedge and Typha cat-tail) vegetation. It also occurs in nearby grasslands and croplands and in low streamside vegetation. The three subspecies other than A. c. beniensis range in elevation from sea level to 500 m (1,600 ft).

== Behavior ==
=== Movement ===
The unicolored blackbird is apparently a sedentary year-round resident.

=== Feeding ===
The unicolored blackbird feeds primarily on insects, small vertebrates (especially fish), and seeds; arthropods other than insects are a smaller part of its diet. In the non-breeding season corn (Zea mays) and other crop seeds are a significant part of its diet. In marshes it often hunts prey while walking on floating vegetation, picking it from the water and the tops and bottoms of plants. It also forages on the ground. In the breeding season it usually forages in flocks of up to about 10 individuals but in the non-breeding season may be in flocks of 100 that may include other icterid species.

=== Breeding ===
In northeastern Argentina the unicolored blackbird breeds between October and May with most activity in November to February, and it sometimes raises two broods in a season. The species' breeding seasons elsewhere have not been defined. It breeds in marshes or flooded grasslands, solitarily or in colonies of up to about 30 pairs. The nest is a cup made from wet plant material that when dry feels like cardboard. It is built in cat-tails or other reeds, typically within about 1.7 m (6 ft) of the water surface. The clutch is three eggs that are pale greenish blue with darker spots and lines. The female alone incubates, for about 12 days. Fledging occurs about 11 days after hatch and in most areas both parents provision nestlings. The shiny cowbird (M. bonariensis) is a common brood parasite.

=== Vocalization ===
Both sexes of the unicolored blackbird are thought to sing, an "alternating liquid shr-r-le rattles with series of repeated warbles or trills (wie-wie-wie-wie, chie-chie-chee, etc.". The species, contact call is chieg.

== Status ==
The IUCN has assessed the unicolored blackbird as being of Least Concern. It has a very large range; its population size is not known but is believed to be stable. No immediate threats have been identified. In Brazil the nominate subspecies and A. c. xenicus are "common to frequent" and A. c. atroolivaceus is "frequent to uncommon". It appears to be most common in Paraguay's Bajo Chico, southern Brazil's Pantanal, Argentina's Iberá Wetlands, and marshes in Bolivia's Beni Department. It occurs in national parks and other protected areas in most countries.
