= Jennifer F. M. Horne =

Kenyan ornithologist and bioacoustician

- Born: Jennifer Felicity Mary Brayne; 27 November 1931
- Died: 5 October 2008 (aged 76); Nanyuki, Kenya
- Citizenship: Kenyan
- Known for: Research on bird vocalisations and African bird species
- Scientific career
- Fields: Ornithologist, bioacoustician

Jennifer Felicity Mary Horne (died 5 October 2008 in Nanyuki, Kenya) also known as Jenny Horne or after her marriage as Jennifer Horne-Short, was a Kenyan ornithologist and bioacoustician.

During a British Ornithologists' Union financed Mascarenes expedition in 1973 and 1974, she made the first complete voice recording study of all endemic land birds including Réunion Harrier, Echo Parakeet, Mauritius Kestrel, Pink Pigeon, Mascarene Swiftlet and Mascarene Martin. In 1974 she teamed up with Colin Groves in the Tana River floodplain where they studied the endangered Tana River Red Colobus and the Tana River Mangabey. In 1978 she married ornithologist Lester L. Short. As research associate and later senior research fellow in the National Museums of Kenya she and her husband took part in an ornithological project which lasted from 1985 to 1999. They studied the behaviour of the honeyguides on the Ol Ari Nyiro estate in Laikipia, Kenya and compiled an ornithological list of all birds recorded on the Ol Ari Nyiro estate. She was also among the team who rediscovered the Cuban Ivory-billed Woodpecker for a short time in 1986/87 (since declared likely extinct). Jennifer Horne was a member of BirdLife International. Together with Lester L. Short she wrote the chapter of the toucans, barbets and honeyguides in the Handbook of the Birds of the World (Volume 7) and the book Toucans, Barbets and Honeyguides: Ramphastidae, Capitonidae and Indicatoridae.

== Publications (selected) ==
- Groves C.P., R.J. Andrew & J.F.M. Horne (1974). Tana river colobus and mangabey. In: Oryx: 12(5): 565–575.
- Short, L.L., J.F.M. Horne & C. Muringo-Gichuki (1990). Annotated Check-list of the Birds of East Africa. Proceedings of the Western Foundation of Vertebrate Zoology 4(3): 61–246.
- Short, L.L. & J.F.M. Horne (2005). The avifauna of an upland seasonal woodland in central Kenya: ecology, behaviour, breeding. Bonner Zoologische Monographien 53: 1–80.
- Horne, J.F.M. (1987). Vocalisations of the endemic land birds of the Mascarene Islands. In A.W. Diamond (ed.), Studies of Mascarene Island Birds. Cambridge University Press, Cambridge, UK in 1987. Pp. 101–150.
- Short, L.L., R. Schodde & J.F.M. Horne (1983). Five-way hybridization of Varied Sittellas Daphoenositta chrysoptera (Aves: Neosittidae) in Central Queensland. Australian Journal of Zoology 31: 499–516.
- Short, L.L. & J.F.M. Horne (2002). Family Indicatoridae (Honeyguides) In J. del Hoyo, A. Elliott & J. Sargatal (eds), Handbook of birds of the World, Vol. 7. Jacamars to Woodpeckers. Lynx Editions, Barcelona. pp. 274–295.
