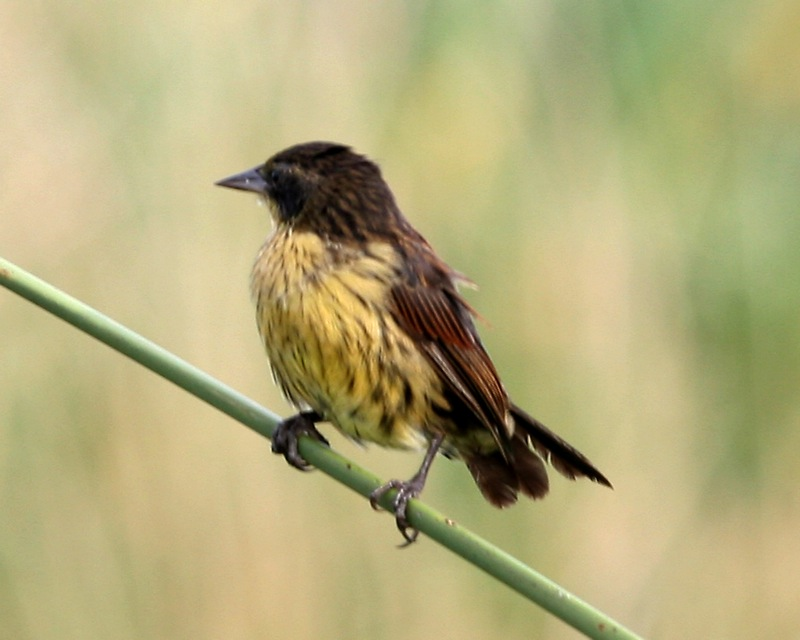
- Unicolored blackbird (Agelasticus cyanopus), Argentina

Scientific classification
- Kingdom: Animalia
- Phylum: Chordata
- Class: Aves
- Order: Passeriformes
- Family: Icteridae
- Genus: Agelasticus; Cabanis, 1851

Type species
- Turdus thilius Molina, 1782

Species
- 3, see text

= Agelasticus =

Genus of birds

Agelasticus is a genus of birds in the New World blackbird and oriole family Icteridae. They have slender forms and narrow bills. Male plumage is mostly or entirely black while that of females is generally brown and streaky. Females are responsible for building the nest, unlike some of their close relatives. The genus occurs only in South America.

== Species ==
The genus contains the following three species:

Genus Agelasticus – Cabanis, 1851 – three species
Common name	Scientific name and subspecies	Range	Size and ecology	IUCN status and estimated population
Pale-eyed blackbird	Agelasticus xanthophthalmus (Short, 1969)	eastern Peru and Ecuador	Size: Habitat: Diet:	LC
Yellow-winged blackbird Male Female	Agelasticus thilius (Molina, 1782) Three subspecies: A. t. alticola; A. t. petersii; A. t. thilius	Argentina, Bolivia, Brazil, Chile, Paraguay, Peru, and Uruguay	Size: Habitat: Diet:	LC
Unicolored blackbird Male Female	Agelasticus cyanopus (Vieillot, 1819)	Argentina, Bolivia, Brazil, and Paraguay	Size: Habitat: Diet:	LC
