= Lester L. Short =

Lester Leroy Short (born May 29, 1933) is an American ornithologist. His main research field is the order Piciformes.

== Biography ==
Short was born in Port Chester, New York. In 1955 he received a PhD from Cornell University. After a study of vertebrate zoology at Charles Sibley in the Cornell University he wrote his dissertation with the title Hybridization in the Flickers (Colaptes) of North America in 1959. From 1960 to 1962 he was assistant professor at the Adelphi University. From 1963 to 1966 he worked for the United States Fish and Wildlife Service. From 1966 until his retirement in 1997 he was Lamont curator of birds at the American Museum of Natural History. In that position he made expeditions to South America, Africa, Asia, Australia and the Pacific islands. In 1972 Short took part on a survey to study the Okinawa woodpecker. After the results of this expedition were published in the Wilson Bulletin in 1973 the American public became aware of the threats which brought the Okinawa woodpecker to the verge of extinction. A planned project to build United States Marine Corps facilities in the Yambaru forest in the northern Okinawa was stopped to protect the woodpecker. In 1986 and 1987 Short was among the members of a Cuban-American-Expedition which were able to observe the thought to be extinct Cuban ivory-billed woodpecker (Campephilus principalis bairdii) for a short while. This was the last reliable sighting of this subspecies.

Short is the author of Woodpeckers of the World (1982), a comprehensive account on the order Piciformes, and of more than 250 scientific articles including descriptions of the Kaempfer's woodpecker and the pale-eyed blackbird. In 1978 he married the Kenyan ornithologist and bioacoustican Jennifer F. M. Horne who died in 2008.

== Bibliography (selected) ==
- Hybridization in the Flickers (Colaptes) of North America, 1959
- Aves nuevas o poco comunes Corrientes, Republica Argentina, 1971
- Birds of the World, 1975
- Woodpeckers of the World, 1982
- The Birdwatcher's Book of Lists: Lists for Recreation and Recordkeeping, 1987
- Annotated Check-list of the Birds of East Africa, 1990
- The Birdwatcher's Book of Lists: Western Region, 1992
- The Birdwatcher's Book of Lists: Eastern Region, 1992
- The Lives of Birds: Birds of the World and Their Behavior, 1993
- Toucans, Barbets and Honeyguides: Ramphastidae, Capitonidae and Indicatoridae (Bird Families of the World), 2001
- del Hoyo, J.; Elliot, A. & Sargatal, J. (editors). (2002). Handbook of the Birds of the World. Volume 7: Jacamars to Woodpeckers. Lynx Edicions. ISBN 84-87334-37-7 (Chapter about the Toucans, Barbets and Honeyguides together with Jennifer Horne)
