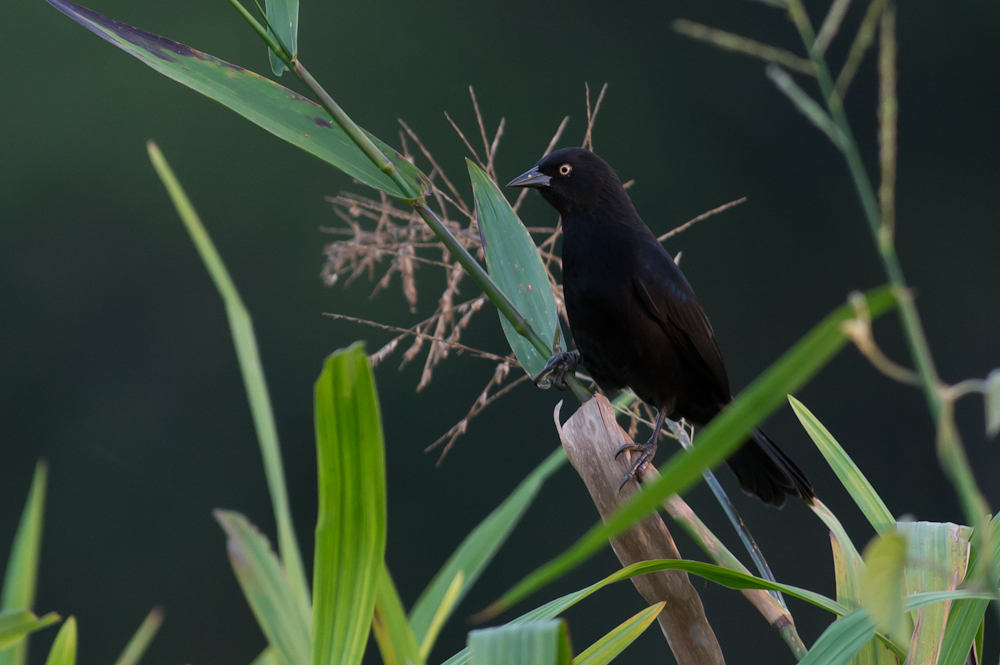

Conservation status
- Least Concern (IUCN 3.1)

Scientific classification
- Kingdom: Animalia
- Phylum: Chordata
- Class: Aves
- Order: Passeriformes
- Family: Icteridae
- Genus: Agelasticus
- Species: A. xanthophthalmus

Binomial name
- Agelasticus xanthophthalmus (Short, 1969)

= Pale-eyed blackbird =

Species of bird

The pale-eyed blackbird (Agelasticus xanthophthalmus) is a species of bird in the family Icteridae. It is found in Ecuador and Peru where its natural habitat is swamps. An inconspicuous bird of very local occurrence, it was first described in 1969 by American ornithologist Lester L. Short.

== Description ==
The adult pale-eyed blackbird is entirely black in both sexes. It has white or pale buff coloured irises to its eyes which are very distinctive and distinguish it from other black birds found in the area such as the velvet-fronted grackle and the shiny cowbird which have dark eyes. Juveniles and immature birds are brownish-black with underparts streaked with yellow or buff.

The call is a loud metallic "tew-tew-tew-tew" similar to that of a black-capped donacobius. It is usually sung from the top of a shrub.

== Distribution and habitat ==
The pale-eyed blackbird is found in a restricted area of eastern Peru and Ecuador. Its habitat is marshy areas round lagoons and oxbow lakes and the fringes of nearby grassland. Since its first discovery in 1969 it has been seen regularly in the Limoncocha National Biological Reserve near the Napo River, Ecuador and in the Tambopata National Reserve near the Madre de Dios River, Peru.

== Behaviour ==
This blackbird is usually seen in pairs and spends most of the day in marshy places in thick undergrowth. It is most visible in the early morning when it emerges into more open areas to forage, and it at this time of day that it is most likely to be heard singing from the top of a bush.

== Status ==
Although it has a very small range, the total population of the pale-eyed blackbird, at over 10,000 mature individuals, is believed to be stable and the bird seems to be facing no particular threats, so the International Union for Conservation of Nature has assessed its conservation status as being of "least concern".
