= 1822 in birding and ornithology =

A summary of 1822 in birding and ornithology.

== Events ==
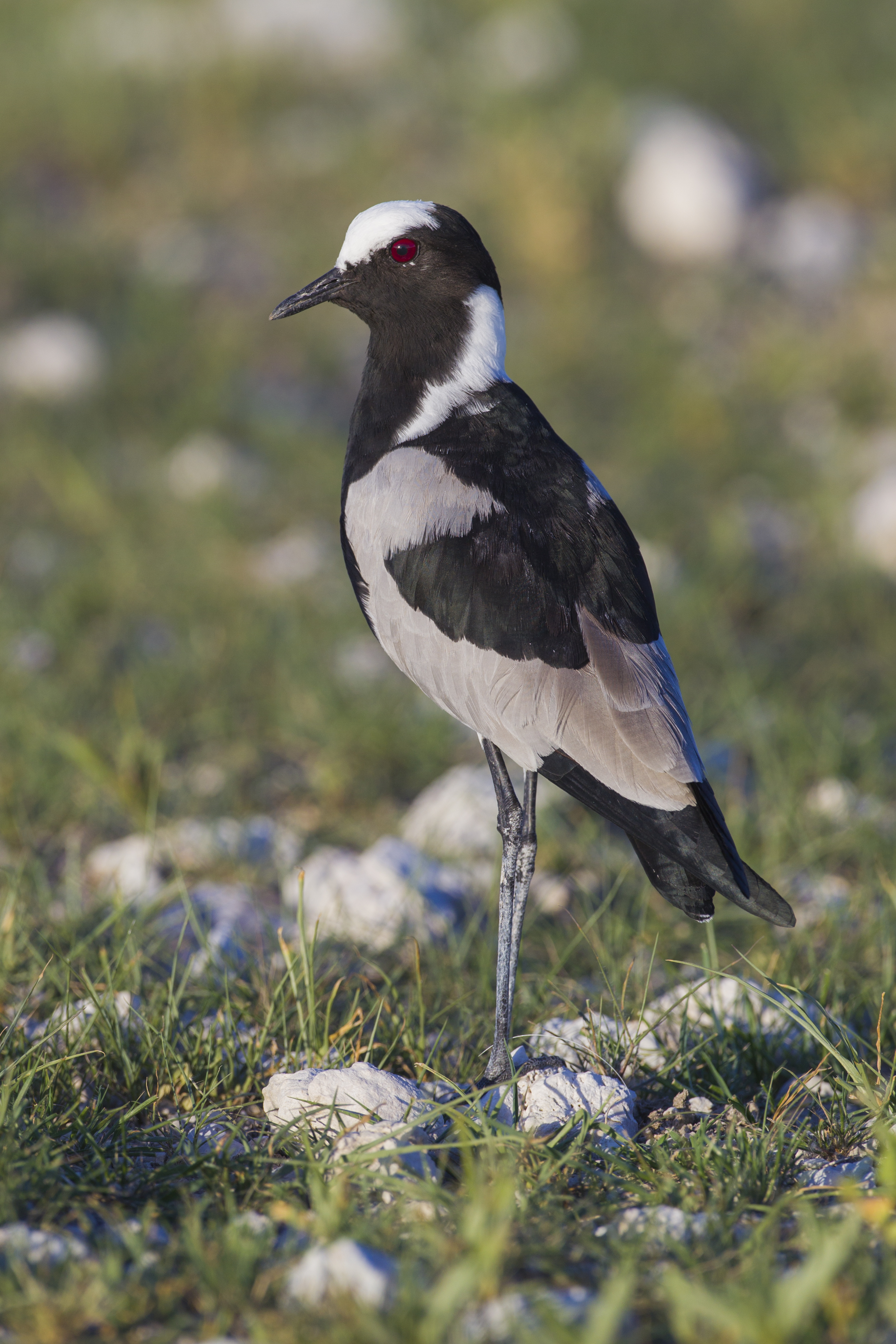
- Blacksmith lapwing
  William John Burchell describes the Kori bustard and the blacksmith lapwing in Volume one of Travels in the Interior of Southern Africa.
- Carl Peter Thunberg describes the planalto tyrannulet in the Memoires of The Saint Petersburg Academy of Sciences
- Carl Hilsenberg describes the sooty albatross
- Eduard Rüppell and surgeon Michael Hey are the first European explorers to reach the Gulf of Aqaba.
- Foundation of Musée d'Histoire Naturelle de Lille
- Heinrich Boie erects new genera of birds in Lorenz Oken's Isis

=== Expeditions ===
- 1822-25 " La Coquille" (later named L'Astrolabe) circumnavigation under Louis Isidore Duperrey,(captain), Deblois (officer), Auguste Bérard (officer), Jules Dumont d'Urville (officer and botanist), René Primevère Lesson (surgeon and zoologist), Prosper Garnot, 1794–1838, (surgeon and zoologist), Victor Charles Lottin, 1795–1858, (hydrographer), Jacques Arago(artist)
- 1822-24 "Jane" & "Beaufoy" Weddell Sea and Antarctic.(British)

=== Ongoing events ===
- William Swainson Zoological Illustrations (commenced 1820) New bird species described in this work in 1822 are the lettered aracari and the Temminck's courser
- Louis Pierre Vieillot Tableau encyclopédique et méthodique des trois regnes de la nature. New species described in 1822 in this work are black-billed scythebill, splendid glossy-starling, ruby-crowned tanager and hepatic tanager

== Deaths ==
- 23 February - Johann Matthäus Bechstein (born 1757)
- 28 November - Francisco Antonio Zea (born 1766)
