= 1823 in birding and ornithology =

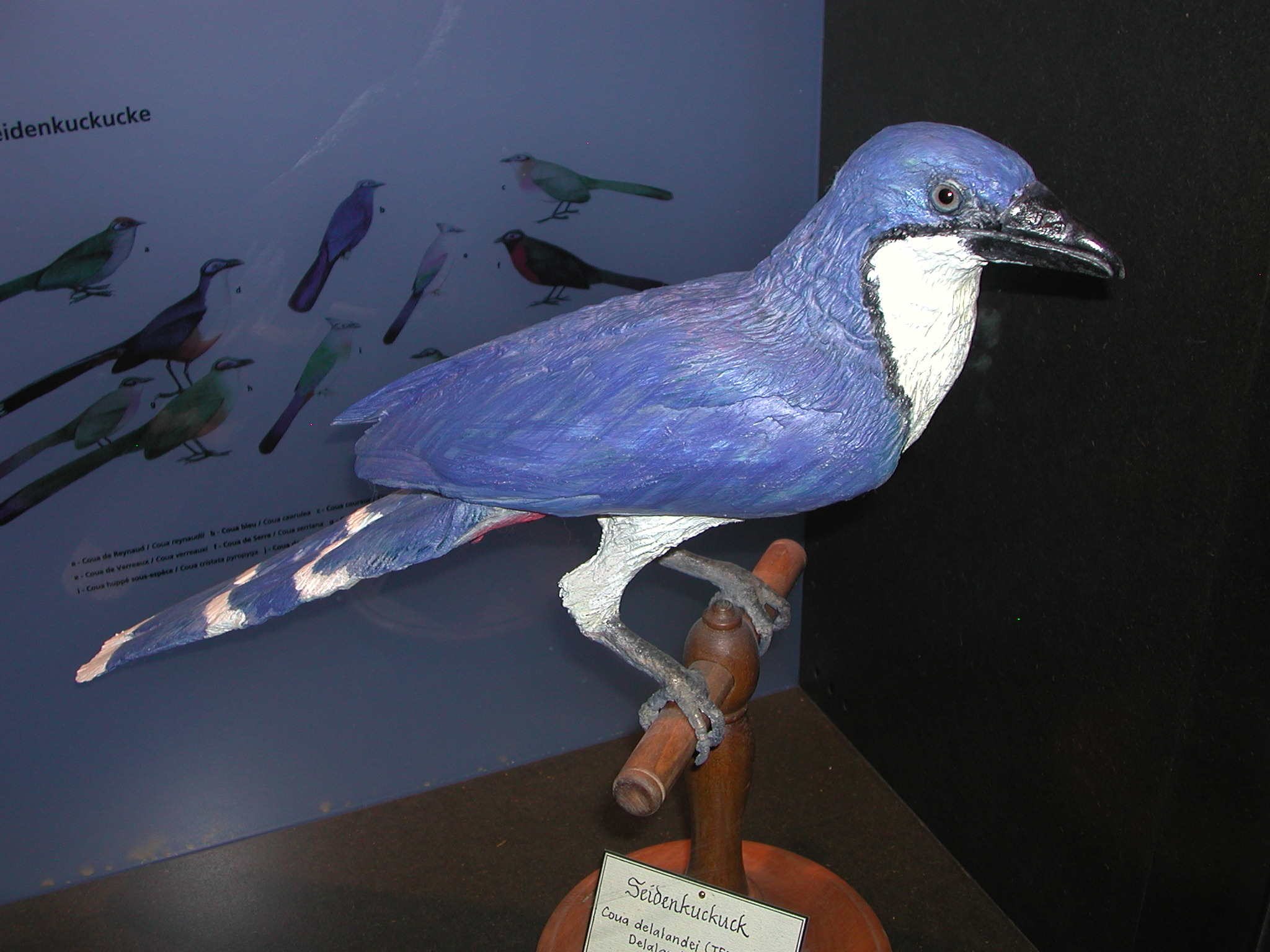
Coua delalandei

- Accademia Gioenia di Catania founded
- Death of Pierre Antoine Delalande
- Martin Lichtenstein describes the mourning wheatear, the chalk-browed mockingbird, the white-tailed lapwing, the kelp gull, Bachman's sparrow and other new bird species in Verzeichniss der Doubletten des Zooligeschen Museums der Universitat Berlin
- Louis de Freycinet is honoured in the bird name Megapodius freycinet
- Thomas Say publishes new bird species in James, E. "Account of an expedition from Pittsburgh to the Rocky Mountains, performed in the years 1819, '20, by order of the Hon. J. C. Calhoun, Secretary of War, under the command of Major Stephen H. Long." One is the rock wren
- Charles Dumont de Sainte-Croix describes jungle babbler, orange-footed scrubfowl, common babbler and rough-crested malkoha in Dictionnaire des Sciences naturelles (see 1804)
- Joseph Paul Gaimard describes the Micronesian megapode.
- Wilhelm Hemprich and Christian Gottfried Ehrenberg explore Egypt, the Libyan desert, the Nile valley and the northern coasts of the Red Sea and subsequently parts of Syria, Jupiter, Arabia and Abyssinia. The specimens collected by the expedition were deposited at the Berlin's Natural History Museum.

Expeditions

- 1823-26 "Predprijaetje", in English Enterprise. All the oceans and the first to Bikini atolls. The captain was Otto von Kotzebue, Johann Friedrich von Eschscholtz and Heinrich Friedrich Emil Lenz were surgeon naturalists.

Ongoing events

- Louis Pierre Vieillot Tableau encyclopédique et méthodique des trois regnes de la nature. New species described in 1823 in this work are three species of tyrant flycatchers, the black-and-white monjita, the white monjita and the black-crowned monjita
