= 1813 in birding and ornithology =

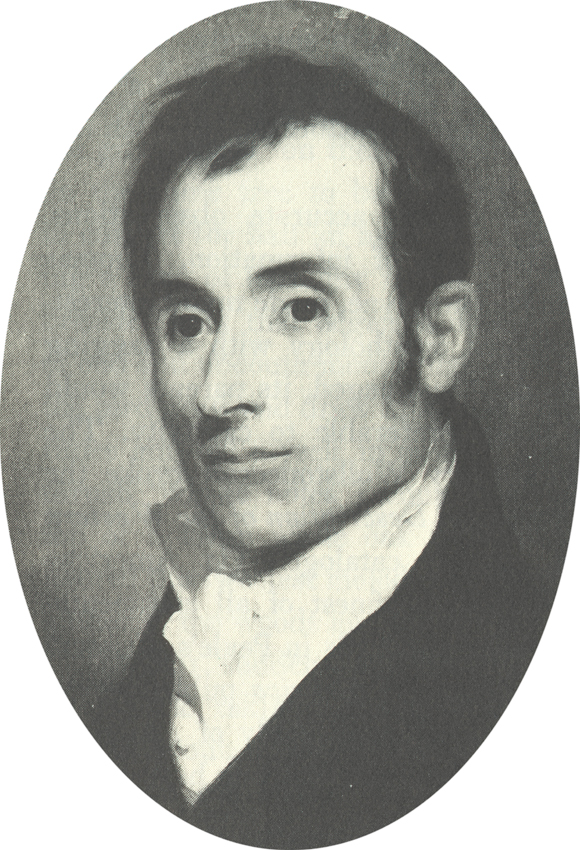
Alexander Wilson 1781–1813

- George Montagu publishes a supplement to his 1802 Ornithological dictionary of British birds.
- Hinrich Lichtenstein begins work at the Museum of Berlin. The avian collection, which started in 1810, contained 2000 bird specimens representing 900 species at the time of his arrival.

Ongoing events

- Coenraad Jacob Temminck: Histoire naturelle générale des pigeons et des gallinacés. New species described in this work in 1813 include Madagascar turtle-dove, spot-winged pigeon, Picazuro pigeon, Picui ground-dove and grey junglefowl.
- Alexander Wilson: American Ornithology (1808–1814). Species described in this work in 1813 include the solitary sandpiper. Wilson died in this year. American Ornithology was completed by George Ord.
