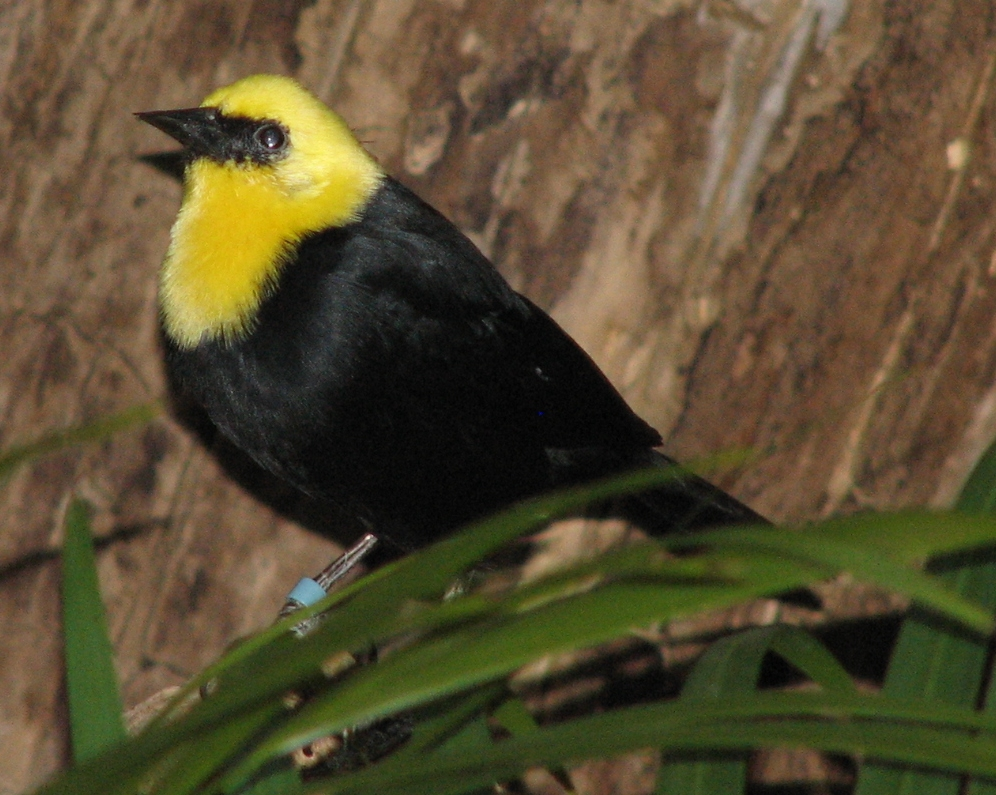
- Male
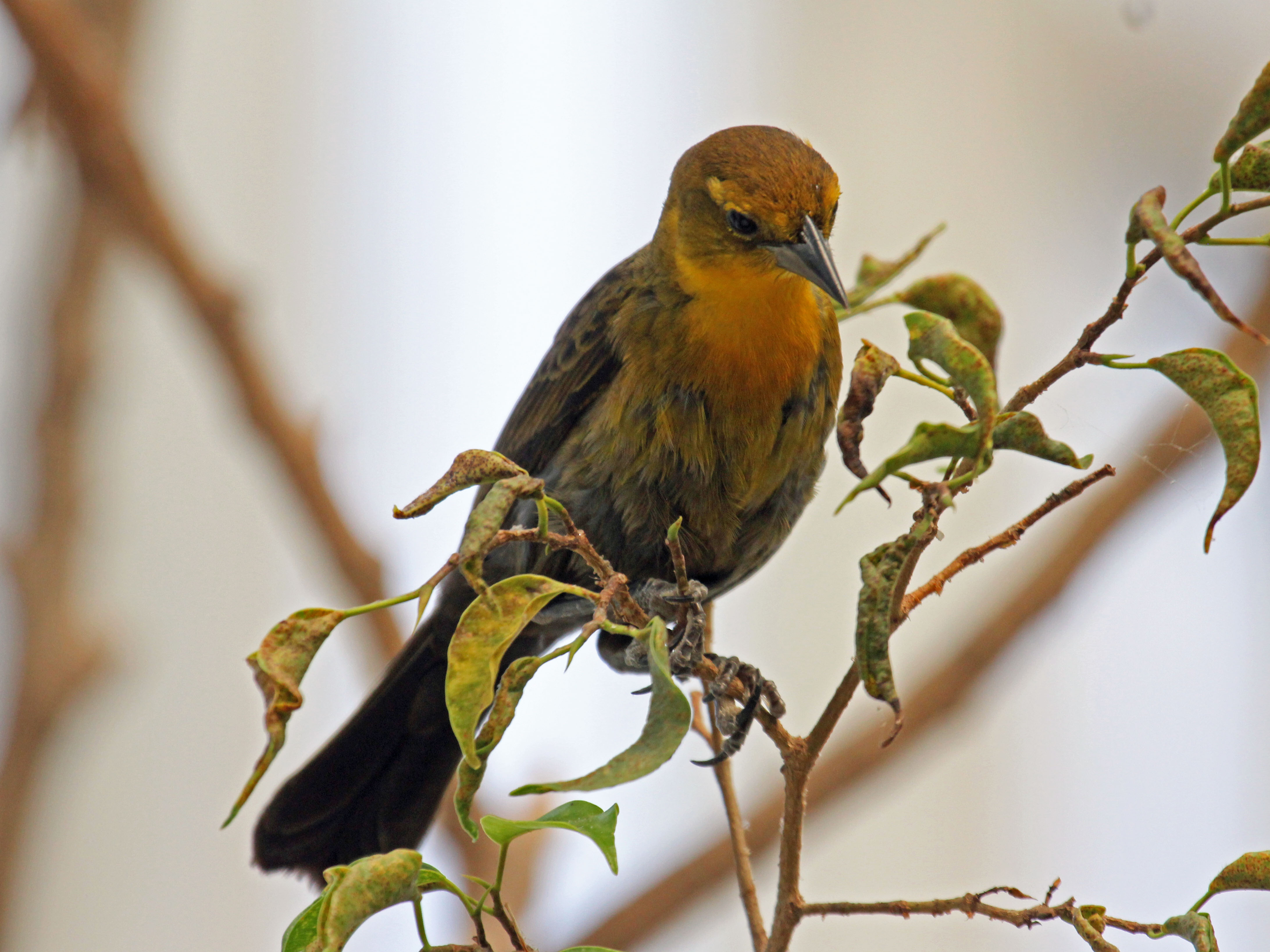
- Female

Conservation status
- Least Concern (IUCN 3.1)

Scientific classification
- Kingdom: Animalia
- Phylum: Chordata
- Class: Aves
- Order: Passeriformes
- Family: Icteridae
- Genus: Chrysomus
- Species: C. icterocephalus

Binomial name
- Chrysomus icterocephalus (Linnaeus, 1766)

Synonyms
- See text

= Yellow-hooded blackbird =

Species of bird

The yellow-hooded blackbird (Chrysomus icterocephalus) is a species of bird in the family Icteridae, the oropendolas, New World orioles, and New World blackbirds. It is found in Brazil, Colombia, French Guiana, Guyana, Peru, Suriname, Trinidad, and Venezuela. It has been recorded as a vagrant on Aruba, Bonaire, and Curaçao. In addition, there is a small population in extreme eastern Panama and a previously misidentified specimen from Barbados.

== Taxonomy and systematics ==
The yellow-hooded blackbird was formally described in 1766 with the binomial Oriolus icterocephalus. It was later reassigned to genus Agelaius and in the late twentieth century to its present genus Chrysomus, which had been erected in 1837. It shares that genus with the chestnut-capped blackbird (C. ruficapillus).

The yellow-hooded blackbird has two subspecies, the nominate C. i. icterocephalus (Linnaeus, 1766) and C. i. bogotensis (Frank Chapman, 1914).

== Description ==
The yellow-hooded blackbird is about 17 to 19 cm (6.7 to 7.5 in) long. Males weigh an average of 35.9 g (1.3 oz) and females average 26.8 g (0.95 oz). The species is sexually dimorphic. Adult males of the nominate subspecies have a bright yellow head, throat, neck, and upper breast except for black lores. Ther rest of their plumage is glossy black. Adult females of the nominate subspecies have a yellow supercilium, throat, and upper breast. Their crown and the rest of their face are citrine. Their upperparts are dull grayish olive with dusky streaks. Their wings and tail are a darker brownish olive. Their underparts are mostly olive with a somewhat olive-streaked brownish belly. Adult males of subspecies C. i. bogotensis are like the nominate. Adult females are darker than the nominate. Their head is less yellowish overall. They have a blackish mask from the lores to the ear coverts and a brighter yellow supercilium that wraps around behind the ear coverts to meet a yellow upper breast. Juveniles are similar to adult females but are duller, have less yellow on the head, paler upperparts, and faintly streaked buffish underparts. Both sexes of both subspecies have a dark brown iris and black legs and feet. Males have a black bill; females' bills often have a pale base to the mandible.

== Distribution and habitat ==
The nominate subspecies of the yellow-hooded blackbird has by far the larger range of the two. It is found in eastern Panama's Darién Province, in northern and northeastern Colombia into Venezuela west of the Andes, across northern Venezuela east of the Andes and mostly north of the Orinoco River, on Trinidad, across the Guianas, in far northern Brazil's Roraima state, and along the Amazon River from its mouth to northeastern Peru's Loreto Department. From there its range continues south along the Ucayali River. It also is found some distance up the Negro River from the Amazon in Brazil. Subspecies C. i. bogotensis is found only on the Bogotá, Colombia plateau.

The nominate subspecies has been recorded once from a nineteenth century specimen on Barbados in the Lesser Antilles and several times as a vagrant on Aruba, Bonaire, and Curaçao. A small population of the nominate became established in Lima, Peru after it was introduced there.

Along the Amazon and its tributaries the yellow-hooded blackbird primarily inhabits marshes and várzea grasslands. Elsewhere it primarily inhabits marshes and also savanna, mangroves, and agricultural lands (especially rice fields). Subspecies C. i. bogotensis is found at about 2,600 m (8,500 ft). The nominate subspecies ranges in elevation at least to 400 m (1,300 ft) in Brazil; in Venezuela it is found up to 600 m (2,000 ft) north of the Orinoco and to 250 m (800 ft) south of it.

== Behavior ==
=== Movement ===
The yellow-hooded blackbird is a year-round resident in most of its range but almost entirely vacates the Venezuelan llanos in the dry season.

=== Feeding ===
The yellow-hooded blackbird feeds on seeds and insects. Cultivated rice is an important part of its diet. It forages mostly in grass and low vegetation and occasionally on the ground. In the breeding season small groups are common; in the non-breeding season flocks of 600 have been noted.

=== Breeding ===
The yellow-hooded blackbird breeds in October and November in the llanos, between July and October elsewhere in Venezuela, from May to November on Trinidad, and from March to September in Suriname. Subspecies C. i. bogotensis breeds between March and May. The species is polygynous, either sequentially or simultaneously with a "harem". It is primarily a colonial breeder though isolated nests are known. Colonies of up to 100 nests are known, in rice fields and in or near marshes. Males build several nests, cups made from wet sedge and grass that dry solid. They are usually attached to cat-tails or similar plants and occasionally are in a tree or shrub. Females choose a nest and line it with fine plant fibers. Often some of a male's nests are not used. The clutch is two to four eggs that are pale blue to white with a few dark spots and lines. The female alone incubates, for 11 to 13 days. Fledging occurs 11 to 12 days after hatch and the female does most of the feeding of nestlings. The shiny cowbird (Moluthrus bonariensis) is a frequent brood parasite; in some areas it attacks a third or more of the nests.

=== Vocalization ===
Male yellow-hooded blackbirds sing two types of songs. One is "brief notes or whistles followed by harsh buzz" and the other "a more variable and pleasant sequence of warbles or whistles". Groups often sing together. The species' calls are chek and "a descending whistle".

== Status ==
The IUCN has assessed the yellow-hooded blackbird as being of Least Concern. It has a very large range; its estimated population of at least 500,000 mature individuals is believed to be increasing. No immediate threats have been identified. However, "Race bogotensis, with very small range, may merit local protection". It is considered common in Colombia, "fairly common to common" in Venezuela, "uncommon to locally fairly common" in Peru, and "frequent to uncommon" in Brazil.
