= George Graves (biologist) =

George Graves (1784–1839) was the author of a comprehensive instruction guidebook for beginners in natural history at a time when there was a growing interest in collecting animal, plant and geological specimens.

== The naturalist's pocket-book ==
His The naturalist's pocket-book, or Tourist's companion: being a brief introduction to the different branches of natural history: with approved methods for collecting and preserving the various productions of nature was published in London, printed for Longman, Hurst, Rees, Orme and Brown in 1818. Written in the tradition of Francis Bacon, it expressed the belief that natural history was about the exploration of nature's bounty for the benefits it could bring to humans:

It is not by the mere accumulating [of] a large variety of curious species that the science is advanced, but it is by acquiring a knowledge of the habits and propensities, the contrasts, the similarities, the uses or injuries they offer to mankind, that gives life and spirit to the science; and in fact is the true and only real use of the study.

The book included sample pages showing the layout which Graves used in his own field notebook, with columns for recording important facts about these points as each item was observed. This encouraged collectors to keep a field notebook recording the information needed for accurate labelling and a formal description of the object. Excerpts from these field notebooks were often included in published descriptions.

== Influence on Darwin ==
In August 1825, the young Charles Darwin bought a copy of A Naturalist's Companion by Graves in anticipation of seaside walks with his older brother Erasmus Alvey Darwin once he went up to Edinburgh in October of that year to begin his undergraduate studies at the University of Edinburgh. The brothers went for regular Sunday walks on the shores of the Firth of Forth and Darwin kept a diary recording their finds, which included a sea mouse and a cuttlefish. In his second year, Charles became active in student societies for naturalists, and joined with others who were interested in collecting on the shores of the Firth.
