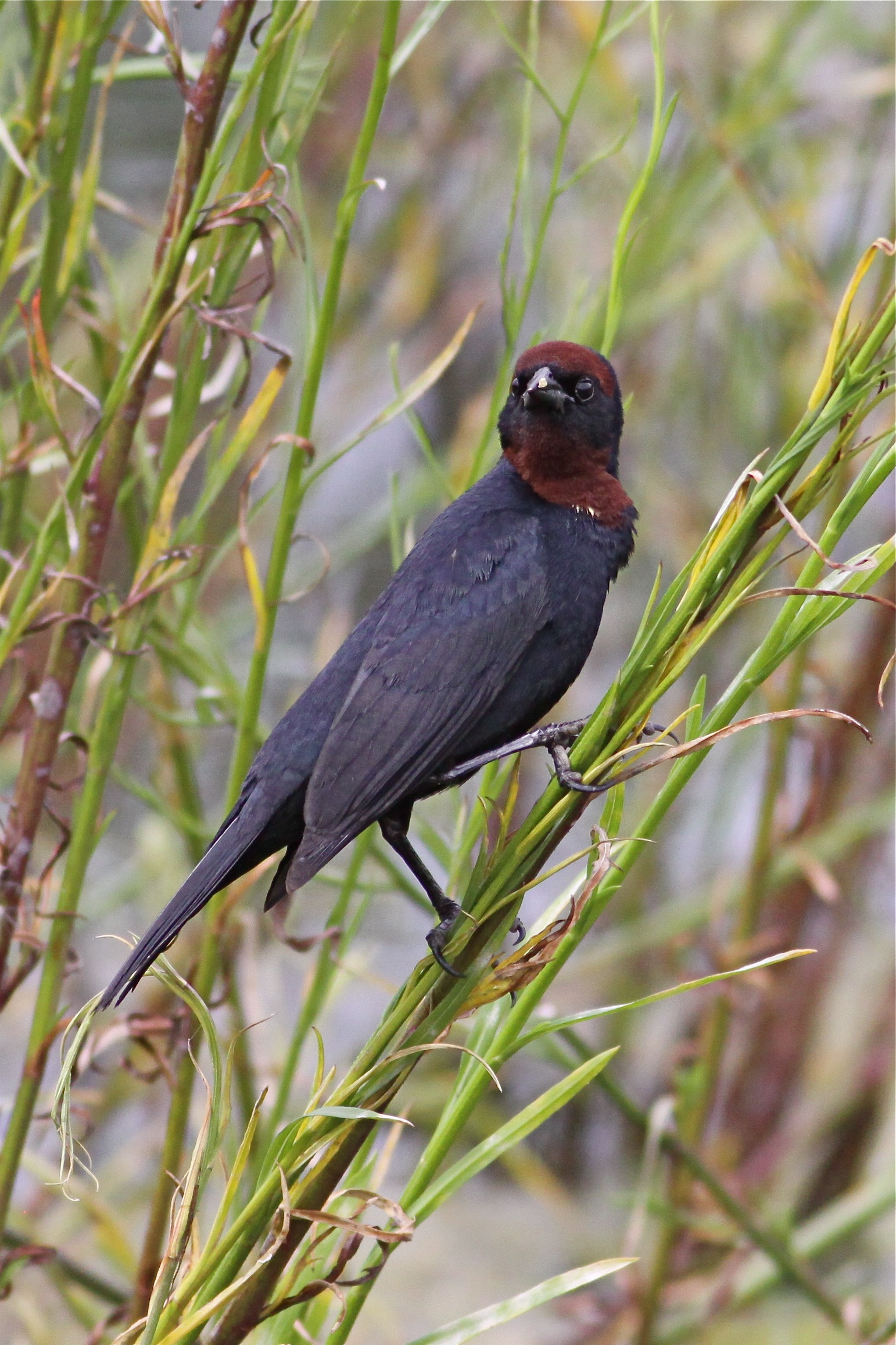
- Male

Conservation status
- Least Concern (IUCN 3.1)

Scientific classification
- Kingdom: Animalia
- Phylum: Chordata
- Class: Aves
- Order: Passeriformes
- Family: Icteridae
- Genus: Chrysomus
- Species: C. ruficapillus

Binomial name
- Chrysomus ruficapillus (Vieillot, 1819)
- C. ruficapillus distribution

Synonyms
- Agelaius ruficapillus Vieillot, 1819

= Chestnut-capped blackbird =

Species of bird

The chestnut-capped blackbird (Chrysomus ruficapillus) is a species of bird in the family Icteridae, the oropendolas, New World orioles, and New World blackbirds. It is found in Argentina, Bolivia, Brazil, Paraguay, and Uruguay.

== Taxonomy and systematics ==
The chestnut-capped blackbird was formally described in 1819 with the binomial Agelaius ruficapillus. In the late twentieth century it was reassigned to its present genus Chrysomus, which had been erected in 1837. It shares that genus with the yellow-hooded blackbird (C. icterocephalus).

The chestnut-capped blackbird has two subspecies, the nominate C. r. ruficapillus (Vieillot, 1819) and C. r. frontalis (also Vieillot, 1819).

== Description ==
Male chestnut-capped blackbirds average 18.5 cm (7.3 in) long and females 17.1 cm (6.7 in). Males weigh an average of 41.3 g (1.5 oz) and females average 32.2 g (1.1 oz). The species is sexually dimorphic. Adult males of the nominate subspecies have a deep dark chestnut forecrown, midcrown, throat, and upper breast. The rest of their plumages is black with a faint bluish gloss. Adult females of the nominate subspecies have a mostly olivaceous brown head with a faint buffish supercilium. Their upperparts are also olivaceous brown with faint dusky streaks. Their throat and upper breast are pale buff to tawny and the rest of their underparts are olivaceous buff. Their throat and underparts have faint dark streaks. Adult males of subspecies C. r. frontalis have a ferruginous crown and breast that are paler than the nominate's. They also have a thin black band around the base of the bill. Adult females have a yellowish tinge on the head and a darker yellow tinge on the throat. Juveniles are similar to adult females but are paler buff-brown with warm brown edges on the upperwing coverts and heavier streaks on the underparts. Both sexes of both subspecies have a dark brown iris, a black bill, and black legs and feet.

== Distribution and habitat ==
Subspecies C. r. frontalis is the more northerly of the two. It is found in eastern Brazil from Amapá east to Rio Grande do Norte and from there south to São Paulo state with a western extent to Goiás. Several sources state that its range also includes French Guiana but the South American Classification Committee has no records there. The nominate subspecies is found in Brazil from Mato Grosso do Sul and São Paulo south and through Uruguay into Argentina as far as La Pampa and Buenos Aires provinces. From there its range extends west across Paraguay into eastern Bolivia's Santa Cruz, Chuquisaca, and Tarija departments.

The chestnut-capped blackbird inhabits a variety of wet landscapes including marshes, rice fields, and wet grasslands and croplands. It occasionally roosts and nests in open woodlands near wetlands. Subspecies C. r. frontalis appears to be partial to irrigated fields and is common in barnyards and corrals.

== Behavior ==
=== Movement ===
The chestnut-capped blackbird is not a conventional migrant but does make significant movements away from drought areas and into flooded ones.

=== Feeding ===
The chestnut-capped blackbird feeds primarily on seeds and includes significant amounts of insects and spiders in its diet as well. It regularly feeds in rice fields; away from them it feeds on naturally-occurring grass seeds. In marshes it feeds mostly in emergent vegetation but also on dry ground. It typically forages in flocks of 1000 or more individuals and flocks of "several thousands" are known. The flocks sometimes include other icterid species.

=== Breeding ===
Subspecies C. r. frontalis of the chestnut-capped blackbird nests in April and May in the northeast; further south both subspecies nest between November and March. The species is polygynous, either sequentially or simultaneously. It is primarily a colonial breeder though isolated nests are known. Colonies of up to 350 nests are known in rice fields. Males build several nests, cups made from wet sedge and grass that dry solid. They are usually attached to cat-tails or similar plants and occasionally are in a tree or shrub. Females choose a nest and line it with fine plant fibers. Often some of a male's nests are not used. The clutch is three to four eggs that are pale blue with a few darker markings. The female alone incubates, for about 13 days. Fledging occurs about 13 days after hatch and the female does most of the feeding of nestlings. The shiny cowbird (M. bonariensis) is a frequent brood parasite; in some areas it attacks half of the nests.

=== Vocalization ===
Male chestnut-capped blackbirds sing two types of songs, though they are highly variable among individuals even within a colony. One type "starts with clicks, warbles or whistles and ends in descending nasal buzz". The other type is "quite musical, either a series of loud, short and tremulous whistles around a sustained pitch...or flute-like notes on ascending scale". An example of the first type is "tip-tip cheeeeeeeer" whose first part is soft and low followed by an extremely high-pitched descending second part. Groups often sing together. The species' contact call is a soft zeb and it also makes a peet call.

== Status ==
The IUCN has assessed the chestnut-capped blackbird as being of Least Concern. It has a very large range; its population size is not known but is believed to be stable. No immediate threats have been identified. It is considered common to locally abundant overall and "common to frequent" in Brazil. It is considered "a major agricultural pest in rice-growing areas" but control attempts have generally been unsuccessful. It occurs in several national parks.
