= 1821 in birding and ornithology =

A summary of 1821 in birding and ornithology.

== Events ==
- Georges Cuvier postulates that no more new species of large animals would be found in Dictum temerario. Instead, many such discoveries were made from the affirmation of Cuvier to the present.
- Sven Nilsson completes Ornithologia suecica (1817–1821)
- Thomas Horsfield describes new species of birds from Java in 1821. A systematic arrangement and description of birds from the island of Java in Transactions of the Linnean Society of London 13: 133–200. Some of which are the tailorbird, Horsfield's bronze cuckoo, the Javan frogmouth, Hodgson's hawk-cuckoo, the red-billed malkoha, the blood pheasant and the white-bellied woodpecker
- Foundation of Naturmuseum Senckenberg.
- William Swainson Zoological Illustrations (commenced 1820) Birds described in this work in 1821 include the Guam kingfisher, the red-stained woodpecker and the pied bushchat.

== Deaths ==
- 20 October - Félix de Azara (born 1746)
