= 1819 in birding and ornithology =

A summary of 1819 in birding and ornithology.

== Events ==
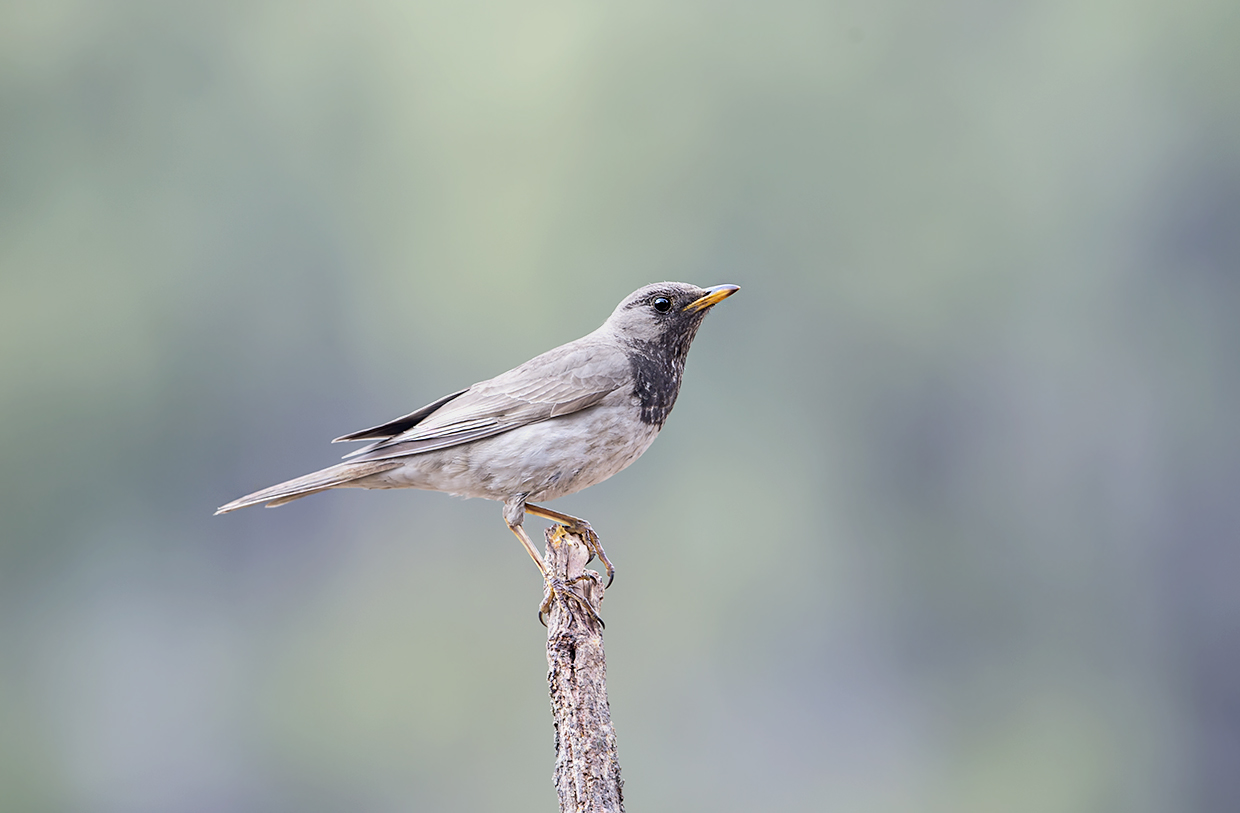
- Black-throated Thrush
  1819 to 1862 Feliks Pawel Jarocki takes over the organisation and management of the Zoological Cabinet of the Royal University of Warsaw. In this year also he described the black-throated thrush.
- Quinarian system proposed by the entomologist William Sharp Macleay . The system was followed by Nicholas Aylward Vigors and William Swainson.
- William Bullock sells his collection.
- Coenraad Jacob Temminck acquires the bird collection of Johann Reinhold and Georg Forster which contained birds from the James Cook expedition. One is the Norfolk Island kākā another is the Tahitian sandpiper
- Foundation of Swedish Museum of Natural History.

=== Ongoing events ===
- Louis Pierre Vieillot publishes the description of the unicoloured blackbird in Nouveau dictionnaire d'histoire naturelle, appliquée aux arts, à l'agriculture, à l'économie rurale et domestique, à la médecine. Other birds described by Vieillot in this work in 1819 are the chestnut-capped blackbird, the black-chested buzzard-eagle, the Chopi blackbird, Vieillot's black weaver, the giant wood rail and the boat-tailed grackle

== Deaths ==
- 27 August - John Lewin (born 1770)
