= 1815 in birding and ornithology =

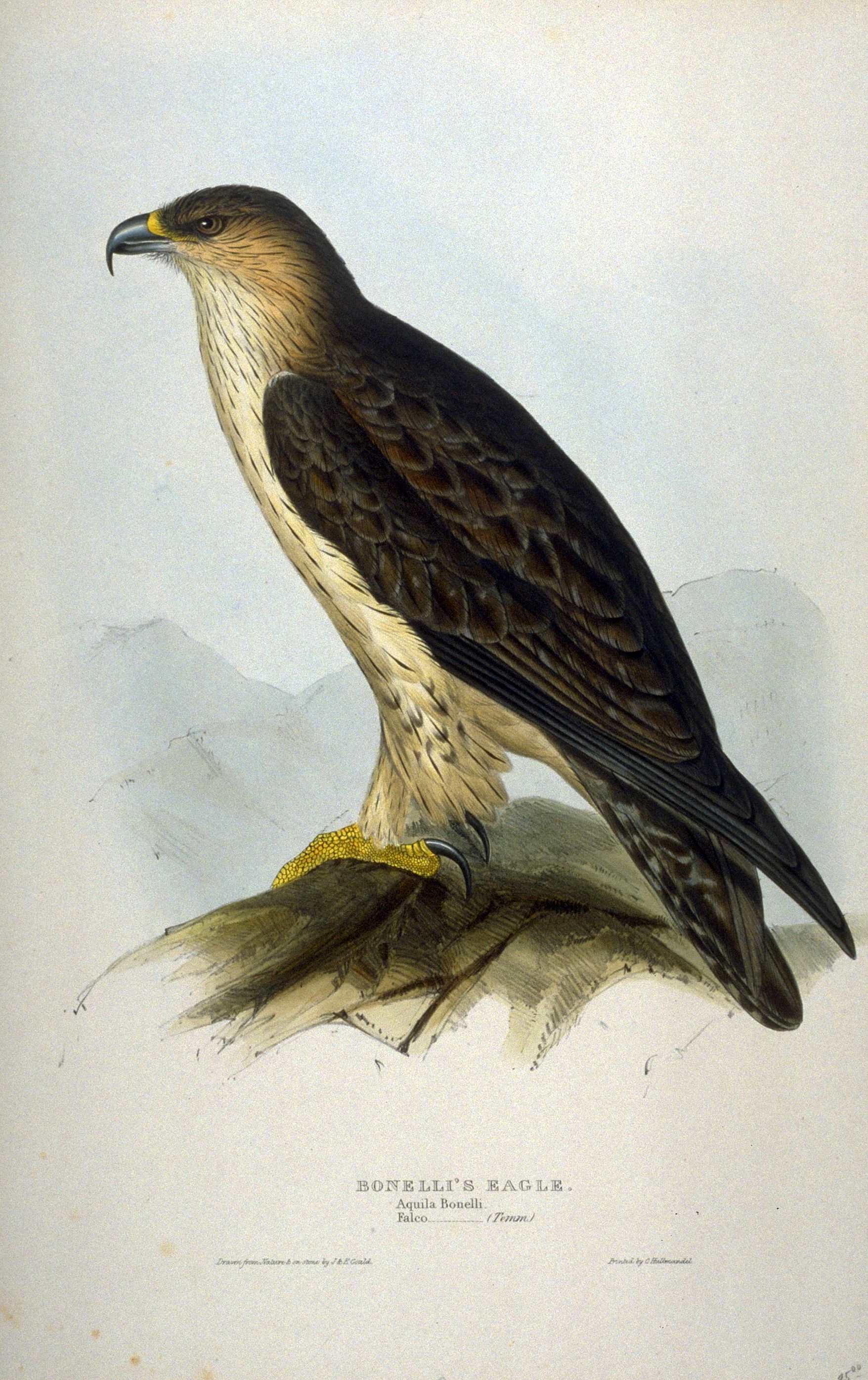
Bonelli's eagle by John Gould

- Death of Alexandre Rodrigues Ferreira
- Franco Andrea Bonelli discovers Bonelli's warbler and Bonelli's eagle named by Louis Vieillot in 1819 and 1822 respectively.
- Constantine Samuel Rafinesque publishes Analyse de la Nature ou tableau de l'univers et des corps organisés in Palermo
- Karl Heinrich Bergius arrives in Cape Town in order to make natural history collections for the Berlin Museum

Ongoing events

- Coenraad Jacob Temminck Histoire naturelle générale des pigeons et des gallinacés New species described in this work in 1815 include the undulated tinamou, the red-winged tinamou, the brown tinamou, the Tataupa tinamou the grey tinamou and the spotted nothura
- James Francis Stephens General Zoology New species described in this work in 1815 include the African cuckoo the greater coucal, the golden-breasted bunting, the chestnut-breasted malkoha the red-chested cuckoo, the lesser honeyguide the Narina trogon and Klaas's cuckoo
