= 1818 in birding and ornithology =

== Deaths ==
- French naturalist Philippe-Isidore Picot de Lapeyrouse dies.

== Species described ==
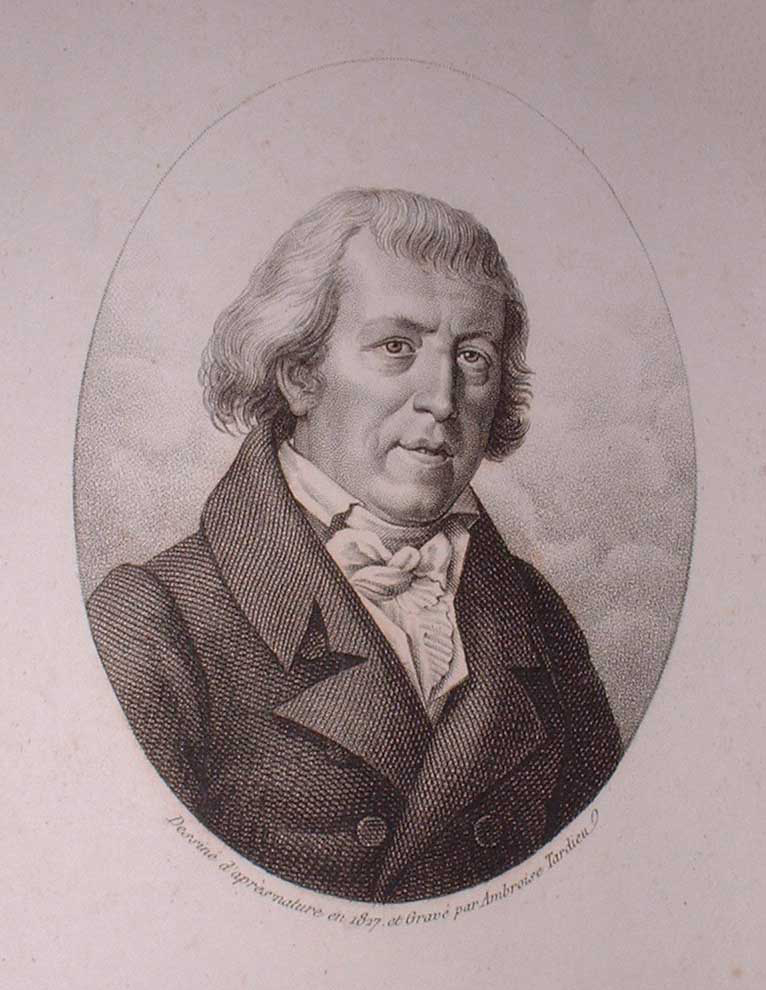
Zoologist Charles Dumont de Sainte-Croix

- Charles Dumont de Sainte-Croix describes the saw-billed hermit.
- Johann Gottlieb Fleischer describes the lesser kestrel.
- Louis Pierre Vieillot publishes the descriptions of dozens of bird species in the 1818 volumes of his landmark treatise Nouveau dictionnaire d'histoire naturelle, appliquée aux arts, à l'agriculture, à l'économie rurale et domestique, à la médecine.

== Museums established or collections begun ==
- The Natural History Museum of Prague is founded.
- National Museum of Brazil is established.
- Pierre-Médard Diard and Alfred Duvaucel move to Chandannagar (Chandernagor in French), where they start a collection of animals and plants for the Paris Museum of Natural History.

== Important publications ==
- Johann Friedrich Naumann begins Die Eier der Vögel Deutschlands und der benachbarten Länder (The Eggs of Birds of Germany and Neighbouring Lands) with Christian Adam Buhle.
- George Graves a comprehensive instruction guidebook for beginners in natural history The naturalist's pocket-book, or Tourist's companion : being a brief introduction to the different branches of natural history : with approved methods for collecting and preserving the various productions of nature
