= 1814 in birding and ornithology =

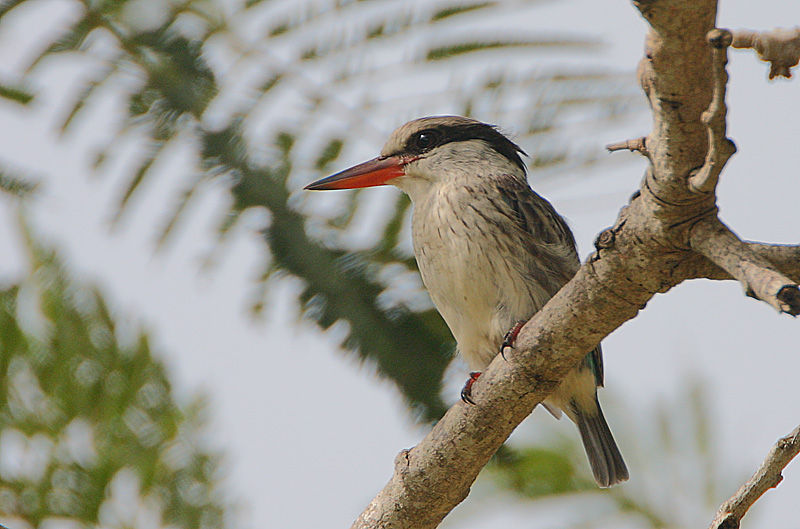
The Striped kingfisher was described by Edward Smith-Stanley, 13th Earl of Derby in 1814 in Remarks on the birds of Abyssinia

- Following the death of George Shaw, James Francis Stephens takes over General Zoology, or Systematic Natural History
- William Elford Leach describes the fasciated antshrike and the black-throated coucal in his Zoological Miscellany (1814–1817)
- Edward Smith-Stanley publishes Remarks on the birds of Abyssinia in A Voyage to Abyssinia, & Travels into the interior of that country, executed under the orders of the British Government in the years 1809 & 1810 by Henry Salt. He scientifically describes the striped kingfisher and the red-billed oxpecker.
- The Linnaean Society of New England founded. Like many such societies it was short-lived.
- Foundation of Natural History Museum at the University of Oslo
