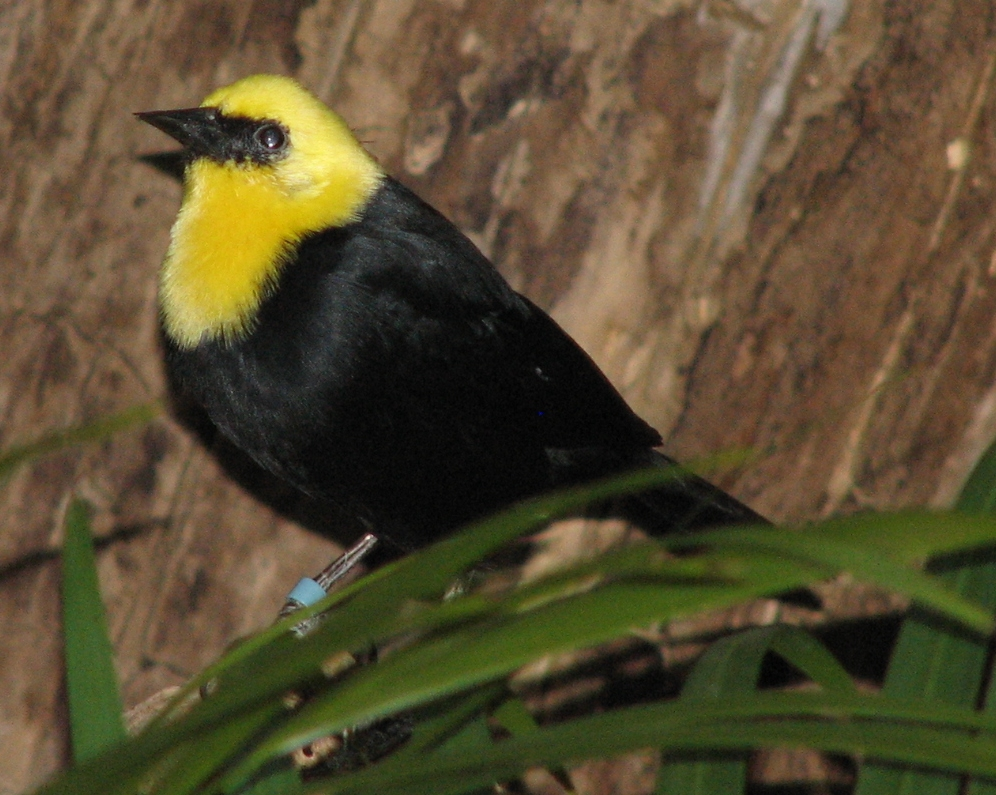
- Chrysomus icterocephalus

Scientific classification
- Kingdom: Animalia
- Phylum: Chordata
- Class: Aves
- Order: Passeriformes
- Family: Icteridae
- Genus: Chrysomus; Swainson, 1837

Type species
- Oriolus icterocephalus Linnaeus, 1766

= Chrysomus =

Genus of birds

Chrysomus is a genus of birds in the family Icteridae.

== Species ==
Established by William Swainson in 1837, the genus contains two species, the yellow-hooded blackbird and the chestnut-capped blackbird:

Genus Chrysomus – Swainson, 1837 – two species
Common name	Scientific name and subspecies	Range	Size and ecology	IUCN status and estimated population
Yellow-hooded blackbird Male Female	Chrysomus icterocephalus (Linnaeus, 1766)	northern South America	Size: Habitat: Diet:	LC
Chestnut-capped blackbird Male Female	Chrysomus ruficapillus (Vieillot, 1819)	Argentina, Bolivia, Brazil, French Guiana, Paraguay, and Uruguay	Size: Habitat: Diet:	LC

The name Chrysomus is a transliteration of the Greek word khrusōma, meaning "wrought gold" or "something made of gold".
