= 2009 in birding and ornithology =

- Years in birding and ornithology: 2006 2007 2008 2009 2010 2011 2012
- Centuries: 20th century · 21st century · 22nd century
- Decades: 1970s 1980s 1990s 2000s 2010s 2020s 2030s
- Years: 2006 2007 2008 2009 2010 2011 2012

See also 2008 in birding and ornithology, main events of 2009 and 2010 in birding and ornithology

The year 2009 in birding and ornithology.

== Worldwide ==
=== New species ===
See also Bird species new to science described in the 2000s

=== Ornithologists ===
==== Deaths ====
- Bob Scott
- David Snow
- Donald Trounson
- Eric Simms
- Geoff Moon
- Ian Rowley
- James Allen Keast
- Kenneth E. Stager
- Mitchell Durno Murray
- Ravi Sankaran
- Richard Zann
- S. A. Hussain
- William H. Behle

== Europe ==
=== Britain ===
==== Breeding birds ====
- A Manx shearwater (Puffinus puffinus) originally ringed on 17 May 1957 at Bardsley Bird Observatory has bred each summer on the island ever since.

==== Migrant and wintering birds ====
- Britain's largest flock of whiskered terns (Chlidonias hybridus) (eleven) at Willington Gravel Quarry, Derbyshire on 24 April. Eight remained on 25 April and the flock scattered to other midland and north-east sites over the next few days.

==== Rare birds ====
- Britain's second brown-headed cowbird (Molothrus ater) from 8–10 May on Fair Isle.

==== Other events ====
- The Ringing Scheme celebrate its centenary, on 17 May, with 36 million birds ringed so far.

=== Scandinavia ===
- Iceland's third bufflehead, a male at Dynjandi from February to April.

== North America ==
To be completed
