= 2008 in birding and ornithology =

- Years in birding and ornithology: 2005 2006 2007 2008 2009 2010 2011
- Centuries: 20th century · 21st century · 22nd century
- Decades: 1970s 1980s 1990s 2000s 2010s 2020s 2030s
- Years: 2005 2006 2007 2008 2009 2010 2011

See also 2007 in birding and ornithology, main events of 2008 and 2009 in birding and ornithology

The year 2008 in birding and ornithology.

== Worldwide ==
=== New species ===
See also Bird species new to science described in the 2000s

- The olive-backed forest robin is first described by Smithsonian ornithologists who discovered it in Gabon.

=== Ornithologists ===
==== Deaths ====
- Johnathan Claud 1972-2008
- Barbara De Wolfe
- Derek Goodwin
- Harrison B. Tordoff
- Himmatsinhji M. K.
- Jennifer F. M. Horne
- John Danzenbaker
- Melvin Alvah Traylor, Jr.
- Robert W. Storer

== Europe ==
=== Britain ===
==== Rare birds ====
- Britain's second American purple gallinule found dead in April or May 2008 at Old Warden Bedfordshire.

=== Scandinavia ===
To be completed

== North America ==
To be completed
