= 2007 in birding and ornithology =

- Years in birding and ornithology: 2004 2005 2006 2007 2008 2009 2010
- Centuries: 20th century · 21st century · 22nd century
- Decades: 1970s 1980s 1990s 2000s 2010s 2020s 2030s
- Years: 2004 2005 2006 2007 2008 2009 2010

See also 2006 in birding and ornithology, main events of 2007 and 2008 in birding and ornithology

The year 2007 in birding and ornithology.

== Worldwide ==
=== New species ===
See also Bird species new to science described in the 2000s

== Europe ==
=== Britain ===
==== Breeding birds ====
- There were eleven deliberate killings by illegal poisoning of red kite (Milvus milvus) in Scotland in 2007; although incidents appear to have decreased in the Dumfries and Galloway red kite project area.
- The Sea Eagle Project team reports 42 territorial breeding pairs of white-tailed eagle (Haliaeetus albicilla) in Scotland with 24 successful broods fledging 34 young. There are probably around 200 individual white-tailed eagles resident in Scotland.

==== Migrant and wintering birds ====
- Record breaking movement of little auk (Alle alle) with 18,713 past the Farne Islands, Northumberland on 9 November; 18,900 past St Abb's Head, Borders and 28,803 past the Farne Islands on 11 November.
- An influx of cattle egret (Bubulcus ibis) began on 3 November with four in Dorset and one at Kenfig Pool NNR on 5 November. In mid–November more arrived in Cornwall and the Isles of Scilly (18th), and by the end of the year they were seen as far east as Sussex and as far north as Dumfries and Galloway.

==== Rare birds ====
- Britain and Ireland's first great blue heron (Ardea herodias) on 7 December 2007 at Lower Moors, St Mary's, Isles of Scilly. Two previous birds in British waters were ship–assisted.
- Britain's first live record of a Madeiran storm-petrel (Oceanodroma castro) on 28 July 2007 on a pelagic, about 7.5 miles SSE of St Mary's, Isles of Scilly.

=== Ireland ===
- Cattle egrets were reported from Co Galway, Co Clare, Co Cork and Co Waterford in November and December.

=== Scandinavia ===
To be completed

== North America ==
=== Canada ===
- British Columbia established a breeding centre for the northern spotted owl (Strix occidentalis caurina), near Vancouver.
