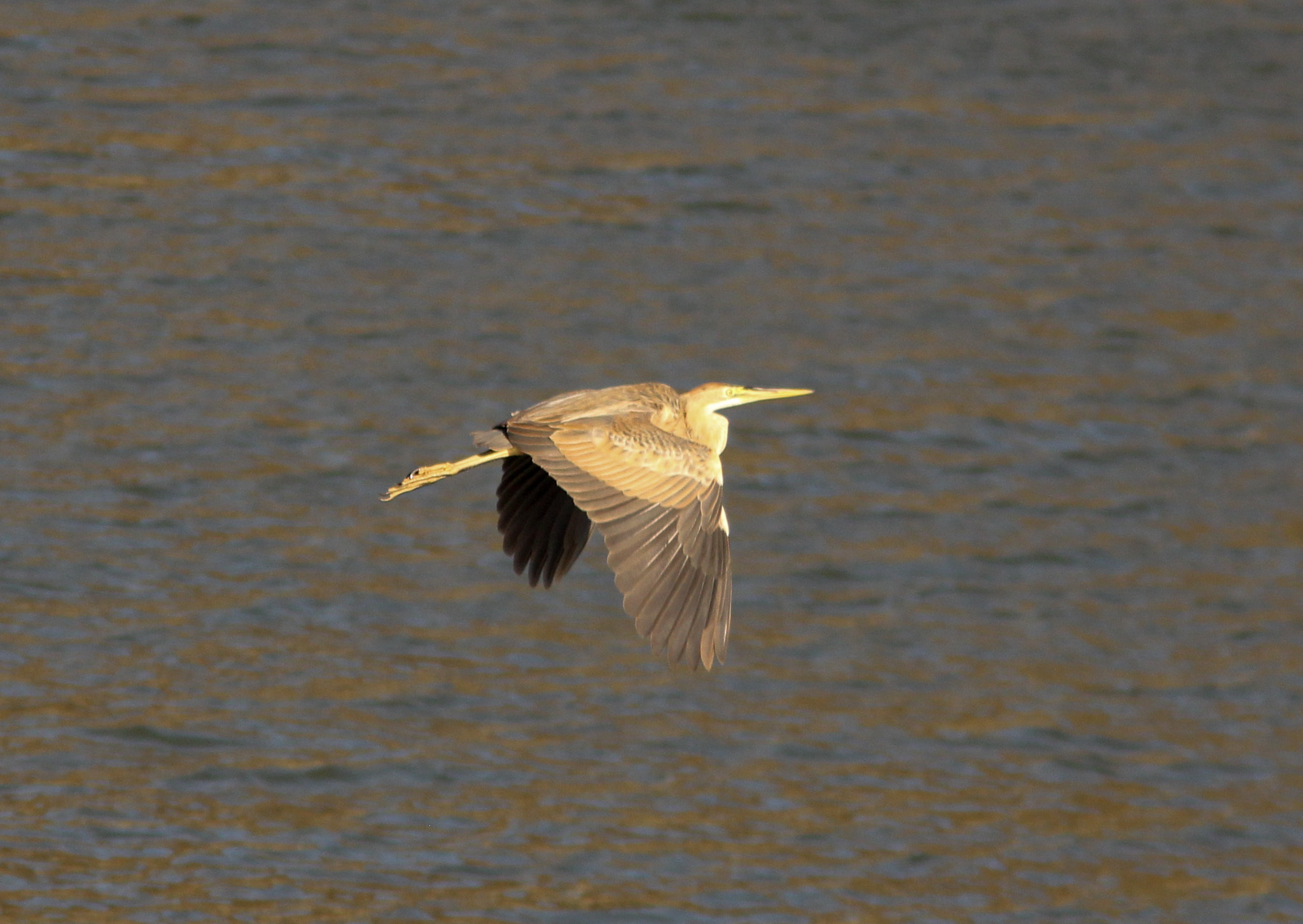

Scientific classification
- Kingdom: Animalia
- Phylum: Chordata
- Class: Aves
- Order: Pelecaniformes
- Family: Ardeidae
- Genus: Ardea
- Species: A. purpurea
- Subspecies: A. p. bournei

Trinomial name
- Ardea purpurea bournei de Naurois, 1966

Synonyms
- Ardea bournei

= Bourne's heron =

Subspecies of bird

Bourne's heron (Ardea purpurea bournei), also known as the Cape Verde heron, Cape Verde purple heron or Santiago heron, or locally in Portuguese as the garça vermelha, is an endangered subspecies of the purple heron that is endemic to the Cape Verde archipelago, in the Atlantic Ocean off the coast of West Africa. It is sometimes considered a full species, Ardea bournei.

== History ==
This heron is named after the ornithologist who first recognised it as being different from the mainland species. He was the British medical doctor, Dr William Bourne, who had a special interest in island birds. He obtained a specimen of this heron in 1951, skinned it and took it to the United Kingdom, by which time it was in a poor condition. The Natural History Museum, London identified it as a rather pale purple heron. It was only after other specimens were collected by Abbé René de Naurois that the differences between the island race and the mainland form were recognised.

== Distribution ==
The only known breeding location of the heron is on Santiago Island, in the Ribeira Montanha village of Banana, in a nesting colony in a pair of African mahogany trees. The population contains about 40 adult birds, or 20 breeding pairs.

== Status ==
The purple heron (Ardea purpurea) has a wide range and is a common bird and its conservation status has been assessed by the International Union for Conservation of Nature as being of "least concern". Bourne's heron is in a much more precarious situation, with all the known adult birds breeding in the same location. There are reports that this population has moved and is now breeding elsewhere on Santiago, at Serra da Malagueta.
