= 2011 in birding and ornithology =

See also 2010 in birding and ornithology, other specialist lists of events in 2010 and 2012 in birding and ornithology.

The year 2011 in birding and ornithology.

== Worldwide ==
To be completed

=== New species ===
See also Bird species new to science described in the 2010s

The palkachupa cotinga, rediscovered in Bolivia in 2000 is proposed as a full species. Currently considered a sub-species of the swallow-tailed cotinga. Likely to be classified as critically endangered.

=== Taxonomic developments ===
- The Taxonomic Sub-Committee (TSC) of the British Ornithologists' Union released their seventh report relating to the British list. The list includes details on the splitting of water rail, whimbrel, and Kentish plover to sub-species level; making Calbot tern a separate species and changing the genus of the European greenfinch from Carduelis to Chloris.

=== Ornithologists ===
==== Deaths ====
- Reg Johnson
- Pauline Neura Reilly
- Mike Imber
- Evgeny Kurochkin
- Don Merton
- Bradley C. Livezey

== Africa ==
- The cargo ship Oliva (Malta) en route from Brazil to Singapore carrying soya beans and 1500 tonnes of fuel ran aground on Tristan da Cunha on 16 March 2011. Concern for the rockhopper penguin, where approximately 90% of the world's population are thought to live, from oil and rats.
- A Lapland bunting at Krechba, mid-Sahara, 900 km south of Algiers on 17 October is the first mainland African record.

== Asia ==
=== China ===
- A third of the world's population of critically endangered, spoon-billed sandpiper are found at the Rudong mudflats; a previously unknown stop–over. 103 of the estimated population of, less than, 300 was seen on 12 October during their 8000 km migration from Russia to south and south–east Asia.
- The breeding grounds of the vulnerable species, blackthroat are found in the Qinling Mountains, Shaanxi Province, north central China.

=== Israel ===
- A firecrest at Mount Bar'on, Golan Heights on 17 December will be a first for Israel if accepted

=== Russia ===
- Thirteen spoon-billed sandpipers transported to the Wildfowl and Wetlands Trust (WWT) reserve at Slimbridge as part of breeding programme intended to halt the decline of this species.

=== United Arab Emirates ===
- A male black redstart at Jebel Dhanna is believed to be the first for the Arabian Peninsula

=== Vietnam ===
- The World Pheasant Association (WPA) receive funding from the Critical Ecosystem Partnership Fund to survey forests in the central Vietnam provinces of Quảng Bình and Quảng Trị for Edwards's pheasant which has not been seen since 2000.

== Australasia ==
=== New Zealand ===
- The Rena (Liberia) a container ship ran aground on the Astroblabe Reef in the Bay of Plenty, North Island, New Zealand on 5 October and was declared New Zealand's worst environmental disaster, with hundreds of dead birds found along the Bay of Plenty coast.

== Europe ==
=== Azores ===
==== Rare birds ====
- A blue-winged warbler on Corvo at Ribeira da Ponte, a first for The Azores and second for the Western Palearctic.
- A female Amur falcon at Criação Velha, Pico on 30 November will be a first for the Azores if accepted.

=== Britain ===
==== Breeding birds ====
- Eight pairs of spoonbills fledged 14 young at Holkham NNR, Norfolk, the second year spoonbills fledged here.
- Norway donated sixteen white-tailed eagles as part of the East Scotland sea eagle reintroduction project.
- The first record of a displaying great snipe came from 11 to 16 May at Cley where one was seen lekking.
- Red-backed shrike bred on Dartmoor for the second consecutive year. This species bred in the UK until the 1990s and last bred on Dartmoor in 1970.
- Seabirds in Scotland continue to struggle with poor breeding performances in many colonies.

==== Migrant and wintering birds ====
To be completed

==== Rare birds ====
- Britain's first white-winged scoter (American nominate race) on 11 June 2011 at Murcar Golf Course, Aberdeenshire.
- Britain's first slaty–backed gull (awaiting acceptance) on 13 January 2011 at the landfill site next to Rainham Marshes, London.
- Britain's second Pacific swift (awaiting acceptance) on 9 July 2011 at Spurn, Yorkshire.
- Britain's third American purple gallinule found dead on 24 January 2011 on Dartmoor, Devon.
- Britain's third white-throated robin on 6 June 2011 at Hartlepool Headland.
- Britain's fifth rock bunting on 8 May 2011 at Bolton Abbey, North Yorkshire. The fourth was in 1967.
- Britain's sixth Audouin's gull on 6 May 2011 at Minsmere, Suffolk.

==== Other events ====
- Will Wagstaff believes it has been the best September in the Isles of Scilly since the late 1980s with northern waterthrush, black-and-white warbler, solitary sandpiper, lesser yellowlegs, Baird's sandpiper, blue-winged teal and red-eyed vireo on the islands.

=== France ===
==== Rare birds ====
- France's first (if accepted) long-toed stint at Salin de Gau near La Turballe in Loire Atlantique on 6 November 2011.

=== Ireland ===
==== Rare birds ====
- Ireland's first white-winged scoter (race stejnegeri) on 9 March 2011 at Rossbeigh, County Kerry. May have been present since late 2010 and was probably present during 2009–10.
- Ireland's first pallid harrier on 22 April 2011 at Ballyvergan Marsh, County Cork. A further record of the same individual or another on 26 April 2011 at Slemish Mountain, County Antrim.

=== Italy ===
==== Rare birds ====
- Italy's second (if accepted) pin-tailed snipe near Siracusa, Sicily on 18 December 2011

=== Lithuania ===
==== Rare birds ====
- Lithuania's third (if accepted) grey phalarope at Kopgalis on 7 December

=== Mediterranean ===
==== Rare birds ====
- Birdlife Cyprus estimate over one third of a million birds are illegally trapped, using mist nets and lime-sticks in Cyprus during the first two weeks of September. Estimate rises to one million for the period 1 September to 23 October.

=== Scandinavia ===
==== Rare birds ====
- Iceland's fourth White's thrush at Nesjahverfi, SE Iceland on 26 November died after flying into a window.
- A bufflehead in Dynjandi, Iceland on 27 December is thought to be the same bird as in February to April 2009
- Sweden's first dusky thrush at Uppland on 12 November.

=== Spain ===
==== Rare birds ====
- Spains first sandhill crane (if accepted) on 4 November 2011 between Palazuelo and Torviscal in Extremadura.

== North America ==
To be completed
