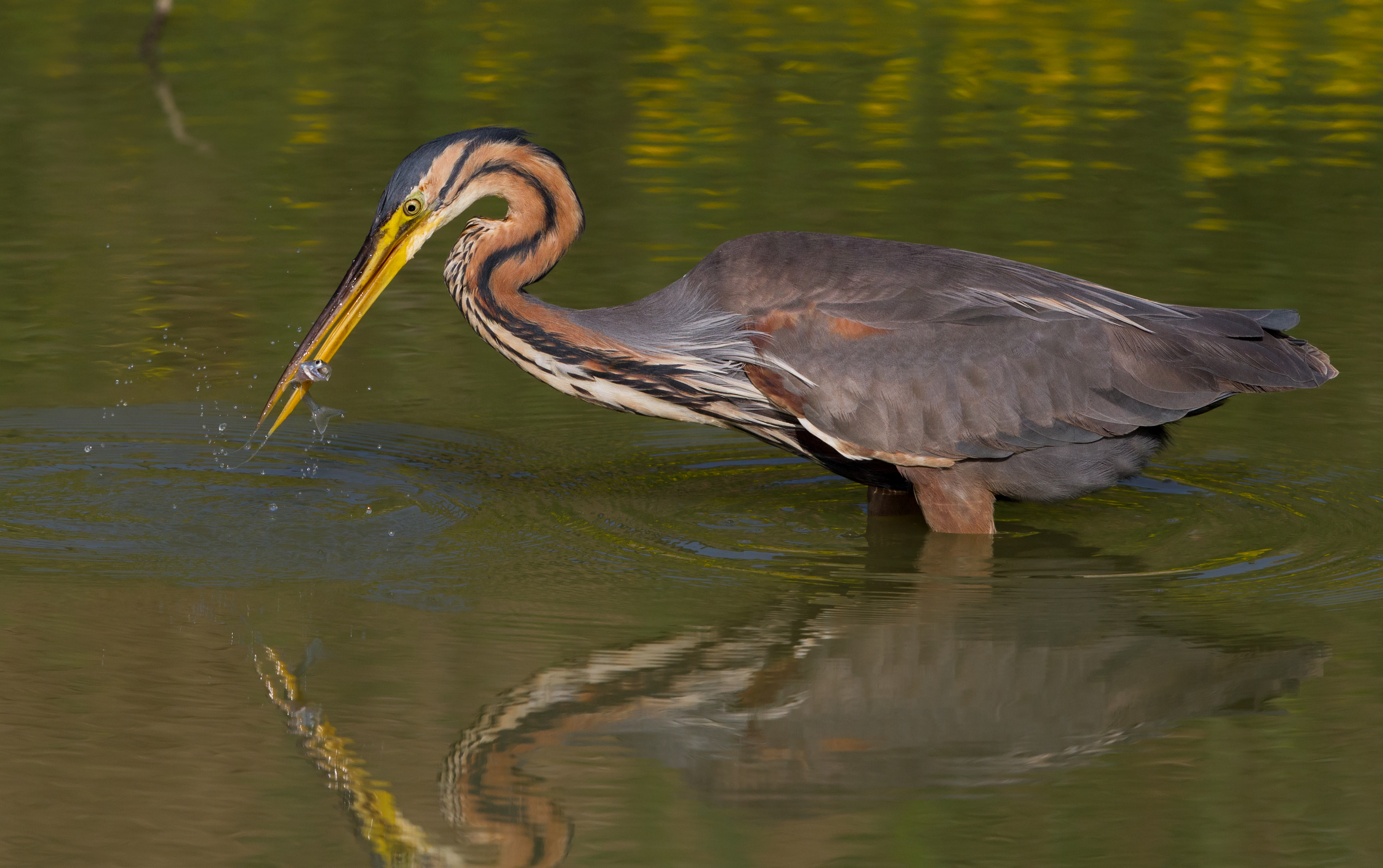
- in Tarn, France

Conservation status
- Least Concern (IUCN 3.1)

Scientific classification
- Kingdom: Animalia
- Phylum: Chordata
- Class: Aves
- Order: Pelecaniformes
- Family: Ardeidae
- Genus: Ardea
- Species: A. purpurea

Binomial name
- Ardea purpurea Linnaeus, 1766
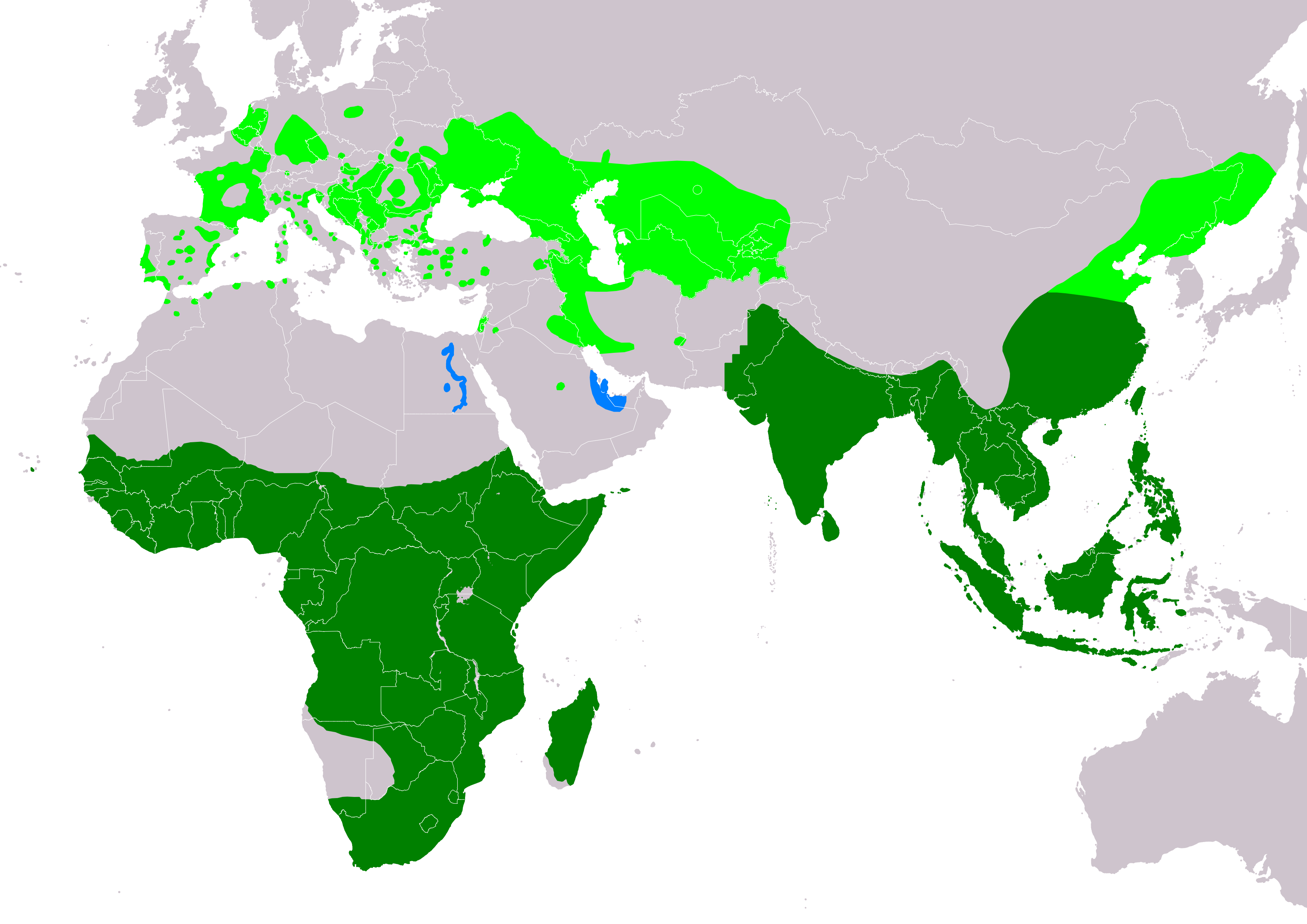
- Range of A. purpurea Breeding Resident Non-breeding

= Purple heron =

Species of bird

The purple heron (Ardea purpurea) is a wide-ranging heron species. It breeds in Africa, central and southern Europe, and southern and eastern Palearctic. The Western Palearctic populations migrate between breeding and wintering habitats whereas the African and tropical-Asian populations are primarily sedentary, except for occasional dispersive movements. It is similar in appearance to the more common grey heron but is slightly smaller, more slender and has darker plumage. It is also a more evasive bird, favouring densely vegetated habitats near water, particularly reed beds. It hunts for a range of prey including fish, rodents, frogs and insects, either stalking them or standing waiting in ambush.

Purple herons are colonial breeders and build a bulky nest out of dead reeds or sticks close to the water' edge among reeds or in dense vegetation. About five bluish-green eggs are laid and are incubated by both birds. The young hatch about four weeks later and fledge six weeks after that. The International Union for Conservation of Nature notes that the global population trend is downwards, largely because of the drainage of wetlands, but assesses the purple heron's conservation status as being of "least concern".

== Taxonomy ==
In 1760 the French zoologist Mathurin Jacques Brisson included a description of the purple heron in his six volume Ornithologie based on a specimen in the collection of Madame de Bandeville, also known as Marie Anne Catherine Bigot de Graveron (1709-1787). He used the French name Le héron pourpré hupé and the Latin Ardea cristata purpurascens. Although Brisson coined Latin names, these do not conform to the binomial system and are not recognised by the International Commission on Zoological Nomenclature. When in 1766 the Swedish naturalist Carl Linnaeus updated his Systema Naturae for the twelfth edition, he added 240 species that had been previously described by Brisson. One of these was the purple heron which he placed with the other herons in the genus Ardea. Linnaeus included a brief description, coined the binomial name Ardea purpurea and cited Brisson's work. Brisson did not specify where the specimen had been collected but Linnaeus gave the locality as "in Oriente". This was restricted to France by Erwin Stresemann in 1920. The scientific name comes from Latin ardea "heron", and purpureus, "coloured purple".

Four subspecies are recognised:

- A. p. purpurea – Linnaeus, 1766: nominate, found in Africa, Europe north to the Netherlands, and southwestern Asia east to Kazakhstan.
- A. p. bournei – de Naurois, 1966: Bourne's heron. Found in the Cape Verde Islands, included in purpurea by some authors, but treated as a distinct species Ardea bournei by some others.
- A. p. madagascariensis – van Oort, 1910: found in Madagascar.
- A. p. manilensis – Meyen, 1834: found in Asia from the Indian subcontinent east to the Philippines and Indonesia, and north to Primorsky Krai, Russia.

== Description ==
3D scan of the skeleton

The purple heron is a large bird, 78–97 cm (31–38 in) in length with a standing height from 70 to 94 cm (28 to 37 in) and a 120–152 cm (47–60 in) wingspan. However, it is slender for its size, weighing only 0.5 to 1.35 kg (1.1 to 3.0 lb). It is somewhat smaller than the grey heron, from which it can be distinguished by its darker reddish-brown plumage, and, in adults, its darker grey back. Adults have the forehead and the crown of the head black, with a dark stripe down the back of the neck that terminates in a slender, dangling crest. This is shorter than the crest of the grey heron and does not exceed 140 mm (5.5 in). The sides of the head and the neck are buffish chestnut, with dark streaks and lines down either side of the whole the neck. The mantle is oily brown and the upper scapular feathers are elongated but not the lower ones. The rest of the upper parts and the tail are brownish grey. The front of the neck is paler than the sides and there are some elongated feathers at the base of the neck which are streaked with white, chestnut and black. The breast is chestnut brown, with some blackening at the side, and the belly and under-tail coverts are black. The brownish-yellow beak is long, straight and powerful, and is brighter in colour in breeding adults. The iris is yellow and the legs are brown at the front and yellowish behind.

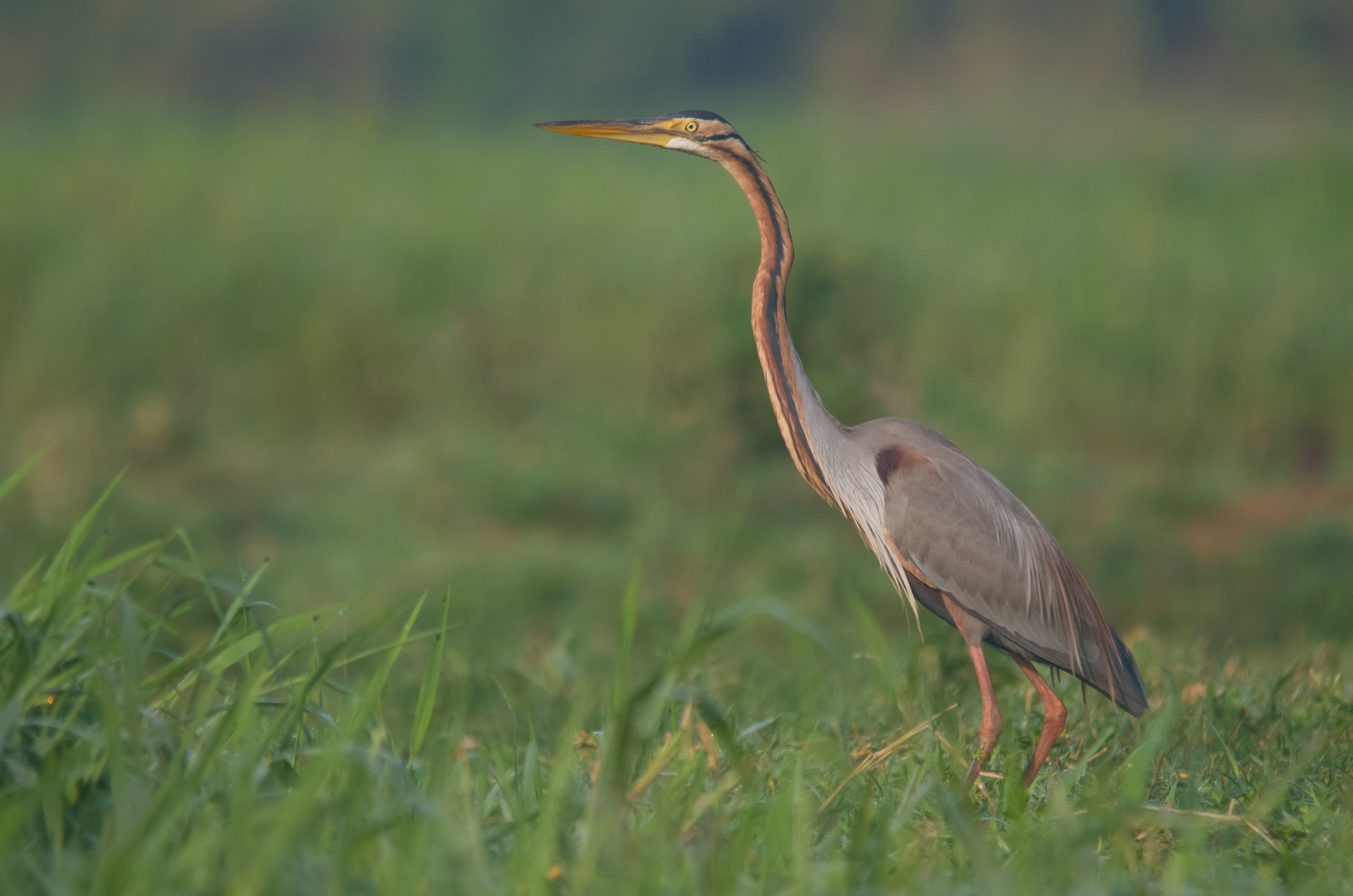
A purple heron at Powai Lake, Maharashtra, India

The call is a harsh "frarnk", but is quieter and more high-pitched than that of the grey heron. It is generally a less noisy bird, though similar guttural sounds are heard emanating from the heronry. It is also less robust, and appears somewhat hollow-chested. Its head and neck are more slender and snake-like than the grey heron and its toes much longer. Unlike that bird, it often adopts a posture with its neck extending obliquely, and even nestlings tend to use this stance.

== Distribution and habitat ==
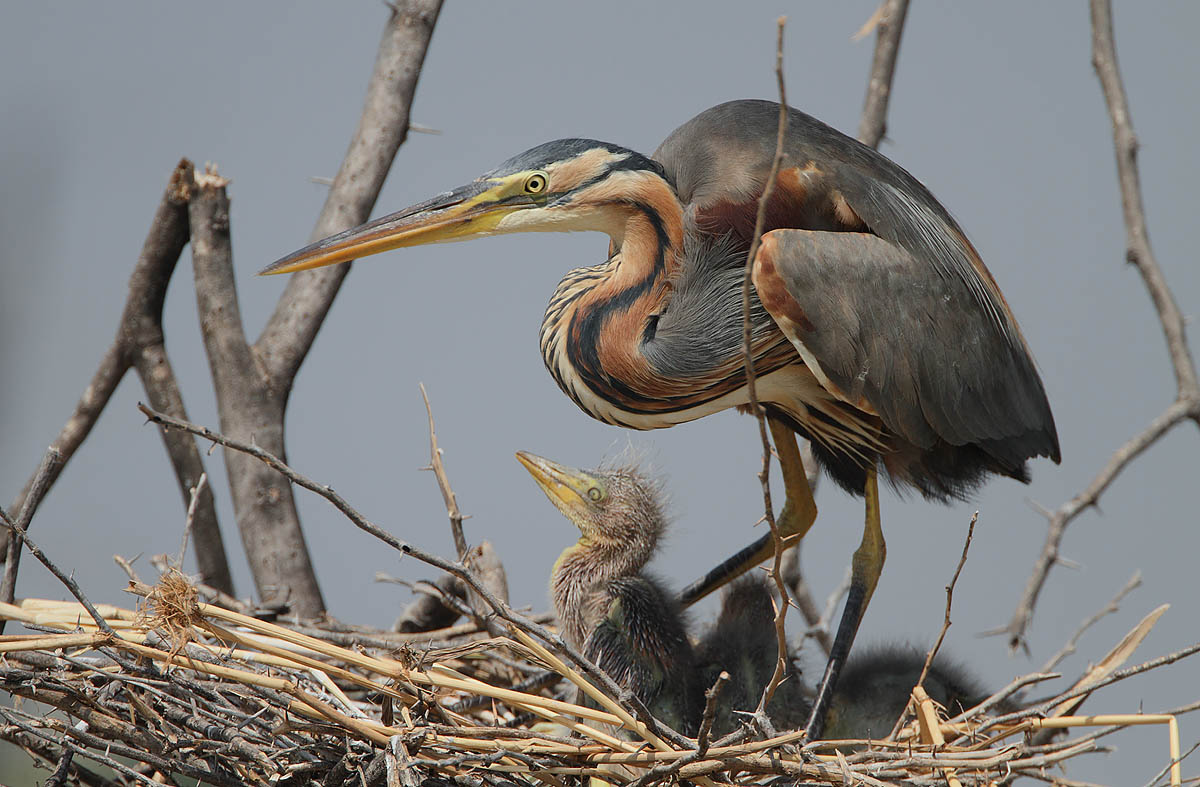
Adult A. p. purpurea with chicks at Lake Baringo, Kenya

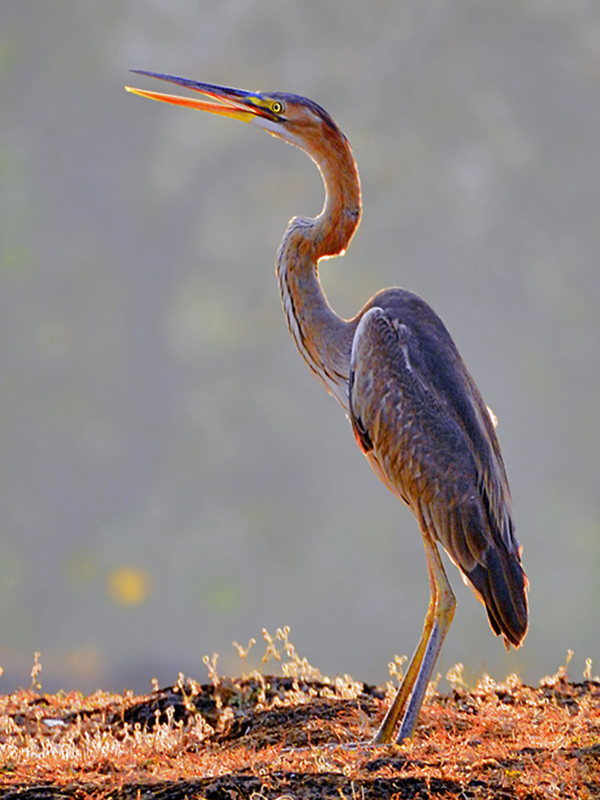
Immature A. p. manilensis, Maharashtra, India

The purple heron has a mostly palaearctic distribution and breeds in Europe, Asia and Africa. The range of the western race extends from Portugal eastwards across much of central and southern Europe and parts of North Africa as far as Lake Balkhash in Kazakhstan. In Africa, the bird breeds in Senegal, down the east coast of Africa and in Madagascar. The eastern race extends from the Indian subcontinent, eastwards to eastern China and the Philippines, and northwards to the basins of the Amur River and the Ussuri River at about 49°N. The southern race is restricted to Madagascar, and a small population of purple herons on the Cape Verde Islands is regarded as a separate race by some authorities.

Between August and October, birds of the western population migrate southwards to tropical Africa, returning northwards in March. Purple herons often overshoot their normal range on their return, and are vagrants to northern Europe including Britain. They have also been recorded in French Guiana, Barbados, Brazil, and Trinidad and Tobago. The eastern population is largely resident, though some birds from the northern part of the range fly southwards to Korea, Thailand and Malaysia. The African birds are resident.

The purple heron inhabits marshes, lagoons and lakes surrounded by dense vegetation. It may frequent mangrove swamps on the coast but it usually chooses freshwater habitats, particularly locations with Phragmites reed beds. It also visits mudflats, river banks, ditches and canals. In the Cape Verde Islands, it is more likely to be seen in the open, on arid slopes.

== Behaviour and ecology ==
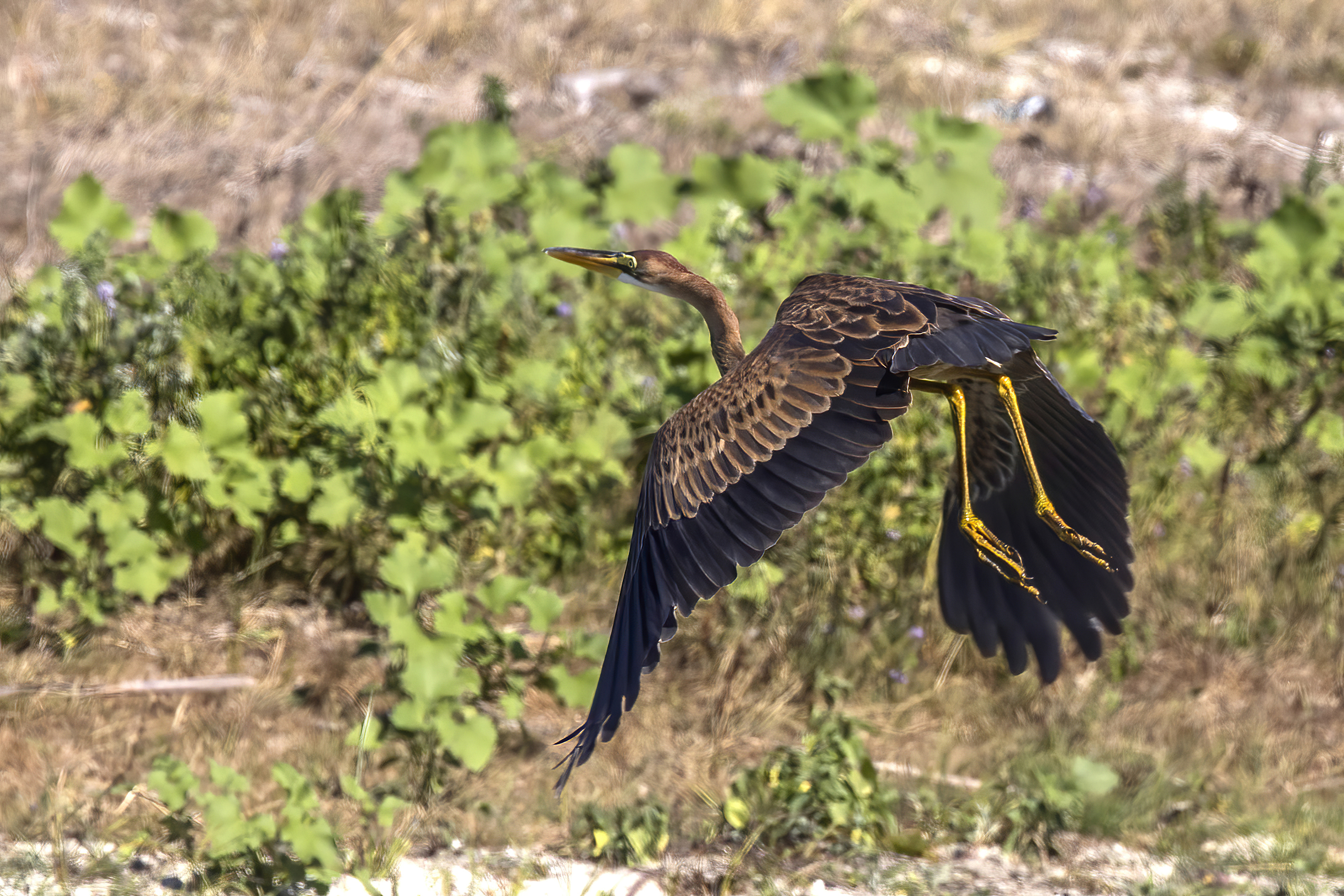
juvenile A. p. purpurea, Danube delta, Romania

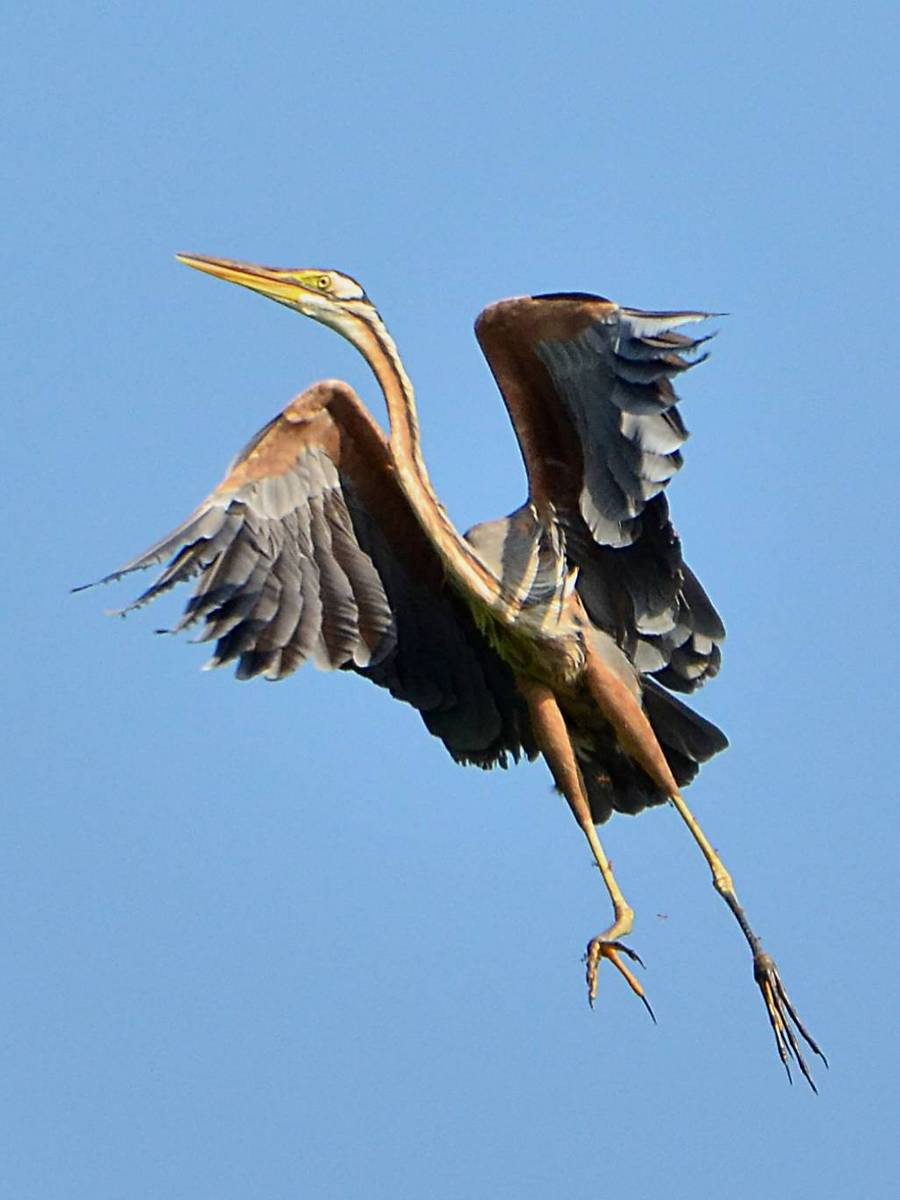
A. p. manilensis in North Sulawesi, Indonesia showing long toes

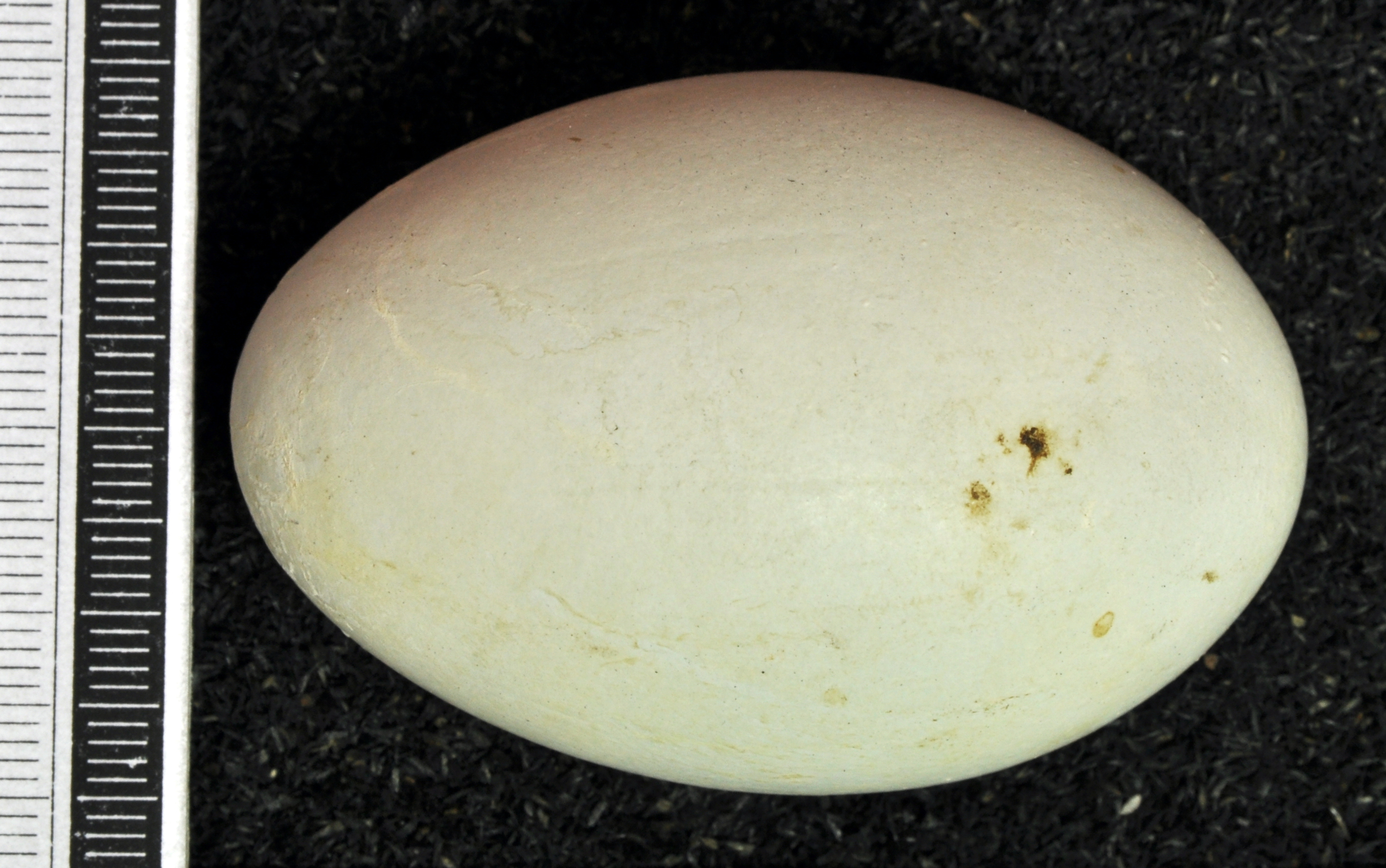
Egg, Collection Museum Wiesbaden

Flight is slow, with the neck retracted and the legs extending a long way behind the tail. This is characteristic of herons and bitterns, and distinguishes them from storks, cranes and spoonbills, which extend their necks in flight. It is a secretive bird, spending less time out in the open than the grey heron and tending to skulk in reed beds. Its long toes mean it can walk on floating vegetation, and it sometimes walks over bushes in the same way, not making any attempt to grip the branches. It seldom perches in trees, preferring more terrestrial sites to rest.

It is most active at dawn and dusk, roosting with other birds in the middle of the day and at night, but increasing its diurnal activity while rearing young. It feeds in shallow water, grabbing its prey with its powerful beak. It will often wait motionless for prey, or slowly stalk its victim. The diet consists mainly of fish, small mammals and amphibians, but nestling birds, snakes, lizards, crustaceans, water snails, insects and spiders are also eaten. Terrestrial beetles are the commonest insect prey, followed by water beetles and aquatic larvae, with grasshoppers, dragonflies, bees and flies also being consumed.

The purple heron usually breeds in colonies but sometimes the nests are solitary. It sometimes associates with other species such as the goliath heron (Ardea goliath) or grey heron at multi-species nesting colonies. The site chosen is generally in reed beds, canebrakes or low bushes close to large lakes or other extensive wetlands. It builds a bulky nest of dead reeds, sticks or whatever is available, carelessly pulling the material together. The eggs are bluish-green, averaging 56 by 45 mm (2.2 by 1.8 in). The clutch is usually four or five eggs, with occasionally seven or eight eggs being laid, though these large clutches may have resulted from two females laying in the same nest. The eggs are laid at intervals of three days, and incubation may begin with the first egg, or start when the clutch is complete. Both parents share the incubation, which lasts between 24 and 28 days, and the care of the young. When an adult brings food, its beak is dragged down by the chicks and it regurgitates food from the crop onto the nest, or the young may take food directly from the beak. The young fledge at about six weeks and become independent at two months. They then disperse widely.

== Status ==
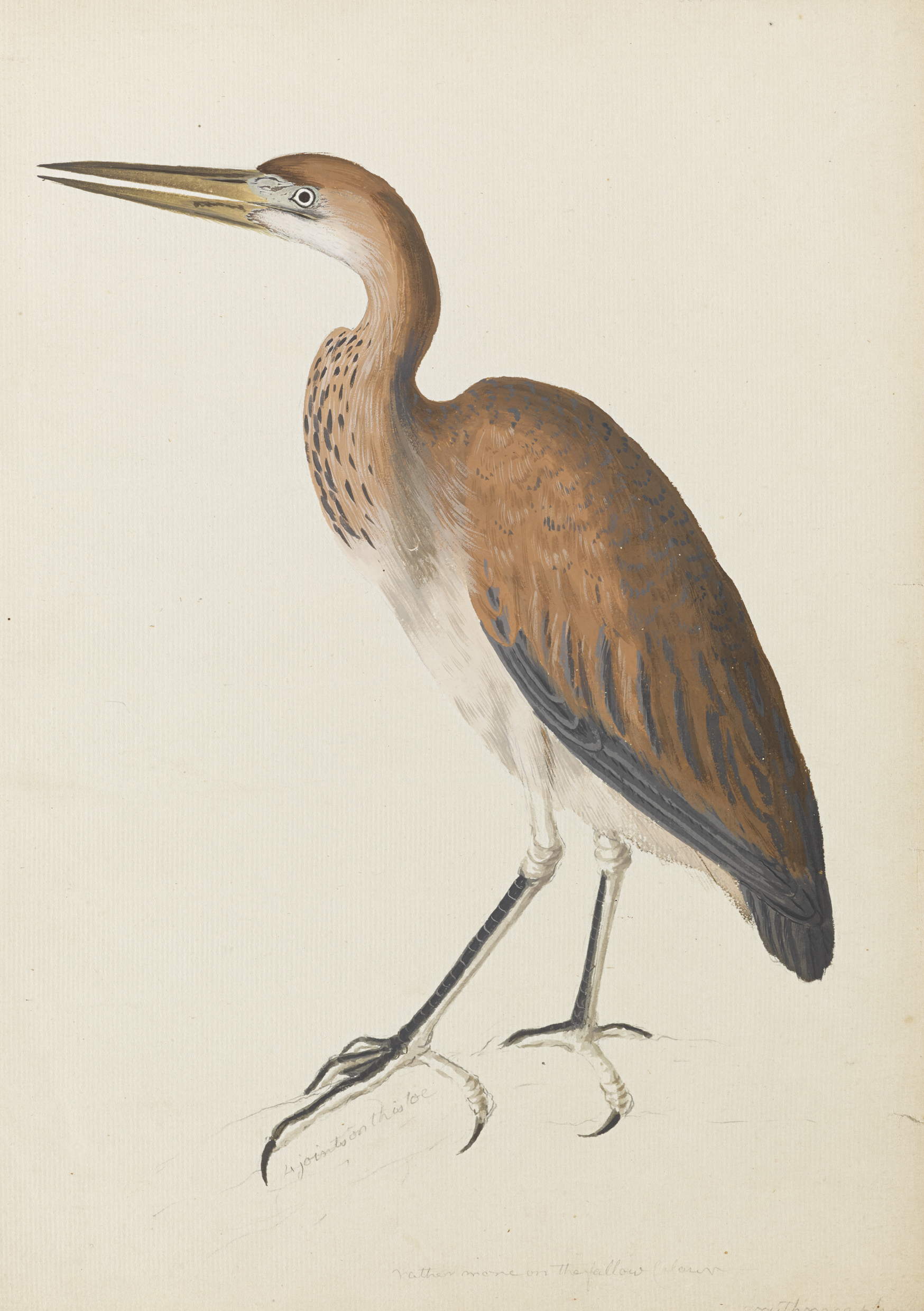
Watercolour illustration of Ardea purpurea Linnaeus: purple heron

The global purple heron population was estimated to comprise 180,000 to 380,000 individuals as of 2019, and the population is probably decreasing; it has therefore been assessed as least concern on the IUCN Red List. The chief threat is drainage and disturbance of wetland habitats, particularly destruction of reed beds. The purple heron is one of the species to which the Agreement on the Conservation of African-Eurasian Migratory Waterbirds (AEWA) applies.
