= Dynjandi =

Series of waterfalls located in the Westfjords, Iceland

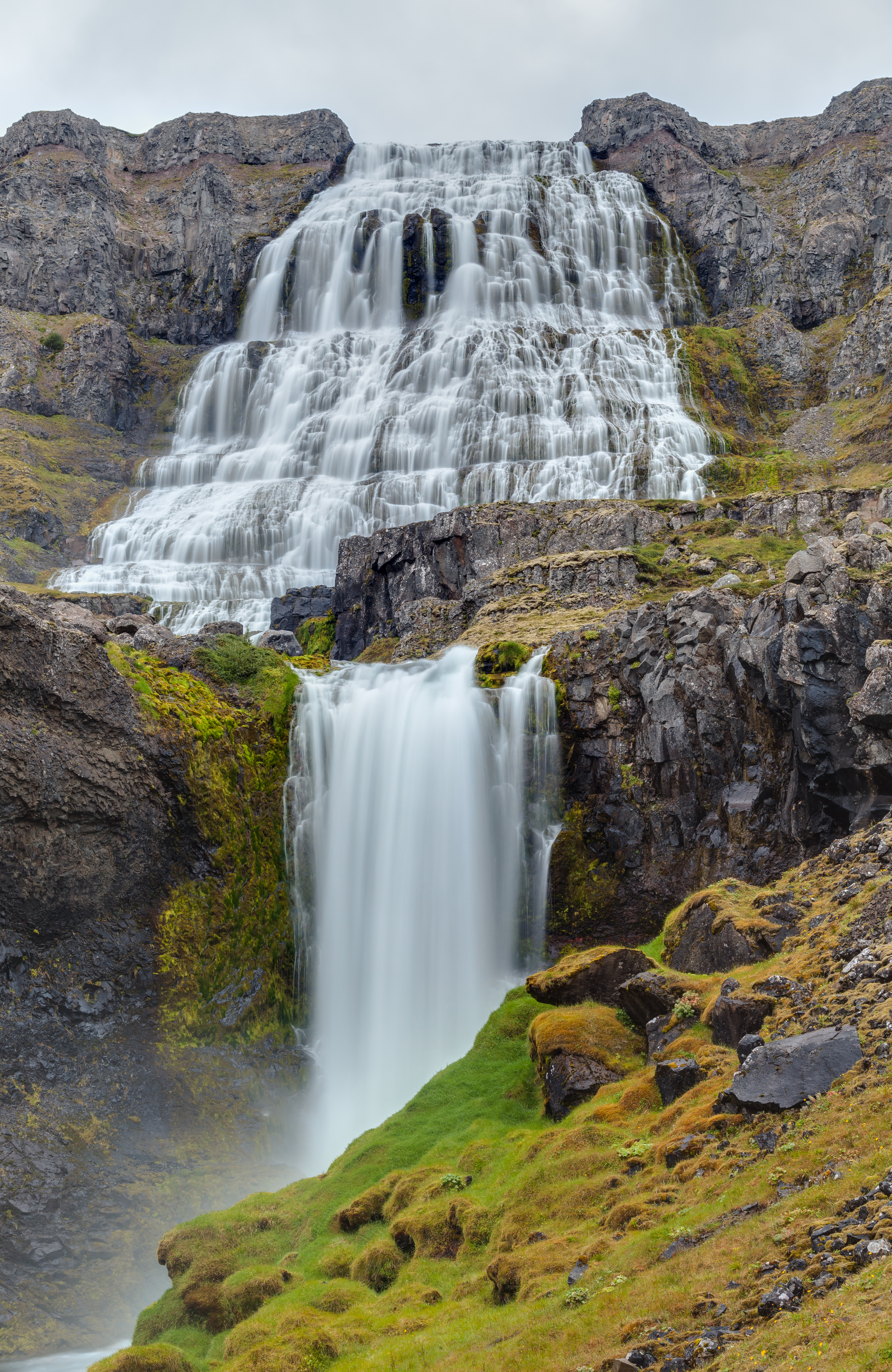
- The cascading Dynjandi waterfalls

- Location within Iceland
- Location: Arnarfjörður, Westfjords, Iceland
- Coordinates: 65°43′57″N 23°11′55″W
- Type: Cataract
- Total height: 100 metres (330 ft)
- Watercourse: Dynjandisá

Dynjandi (Icelandic pronunciation: [ˈtɪnjantɪ], also known as Fjallfoss [ˈfjatl̥ˌfɔsː]) is a waterfall located in Arnarfjörður in the Westfjords region of Iceland. It is the largest waterfall in the Westfjords and has a total height of 100 metres (330 ft). Below it are five other waterfalls: Háifoss, Úðafoss, Göngufoss, Hundafoss and Bæjarfoss.

Dynjandi and other waterfalls in Dynjandisá and their surroundings were protected as natural monuments in 1981.

Dynjandisheiði is a mountain pass over the falls that contains the first-built car-accessible road to Ísafjörður.

== Photos ==
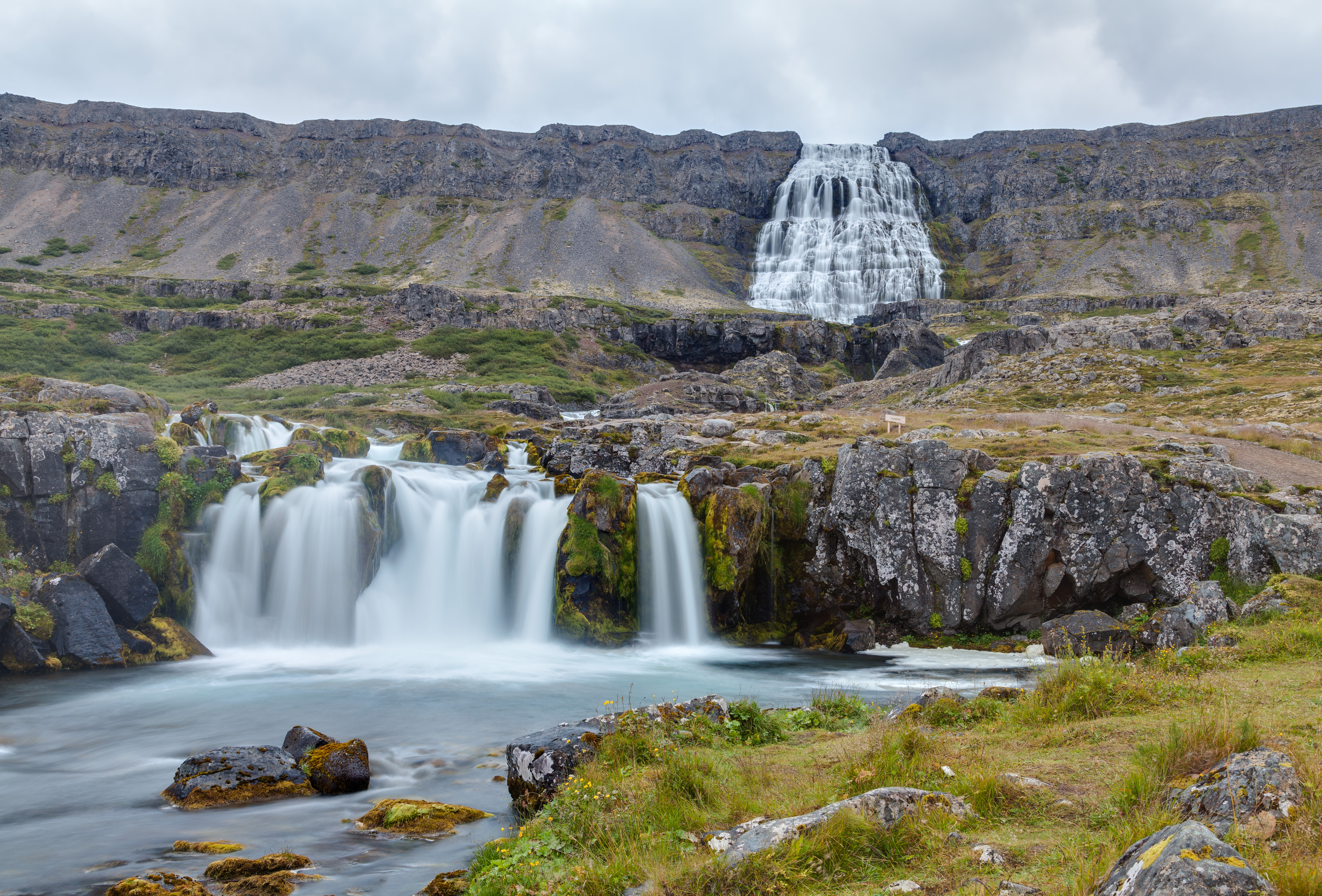
Bæjarfoss

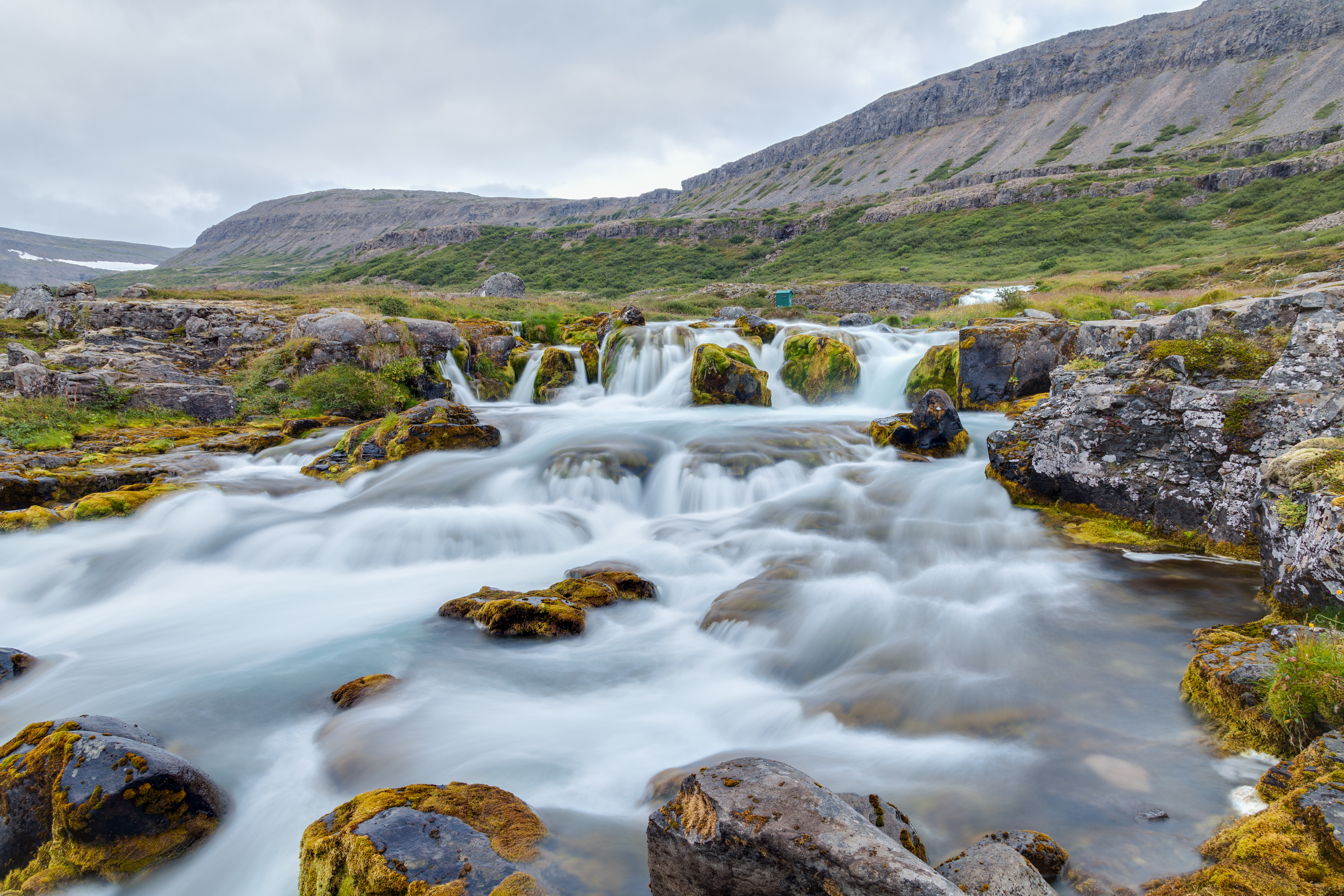
Hundafoss

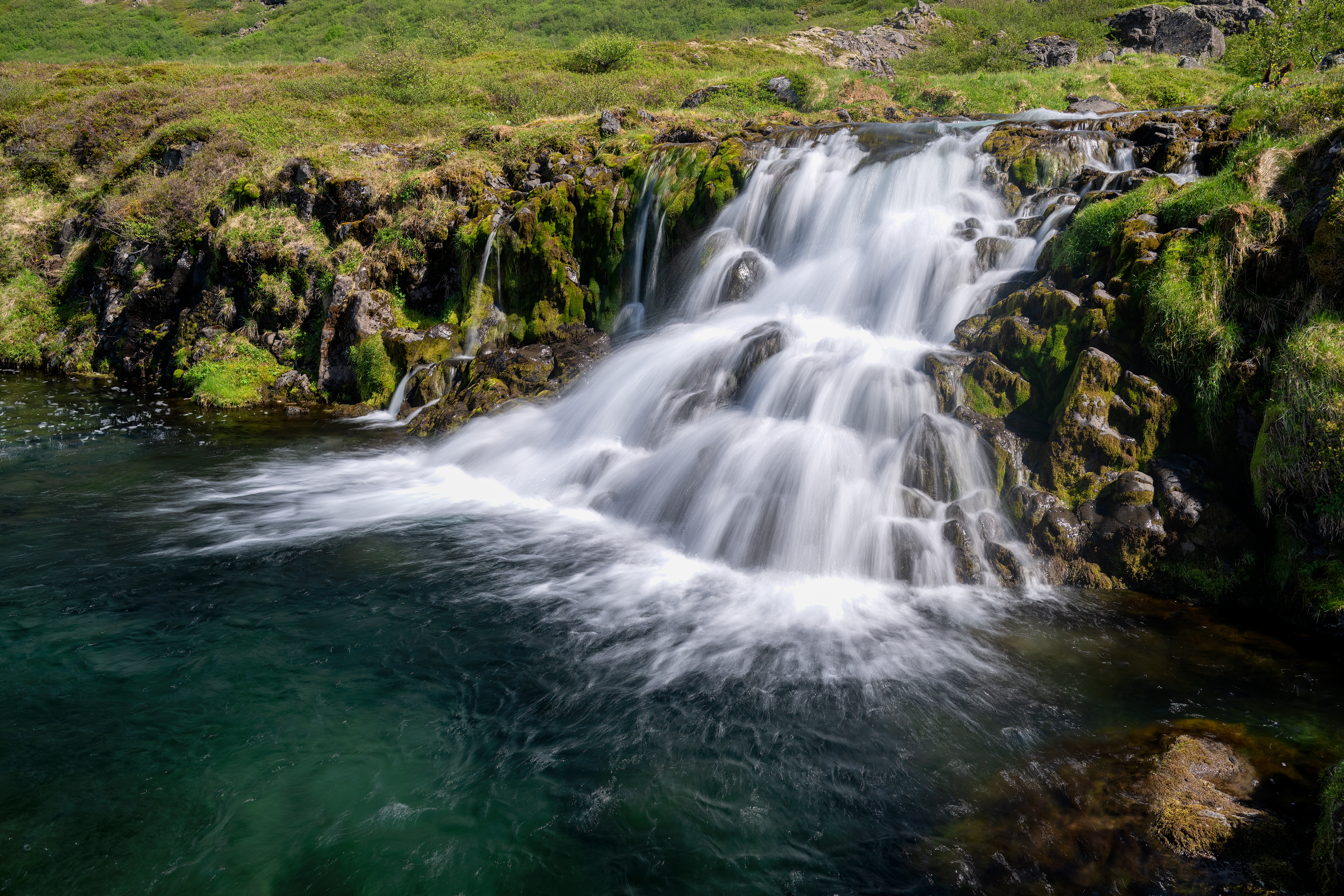
Hrísvaðsfoss

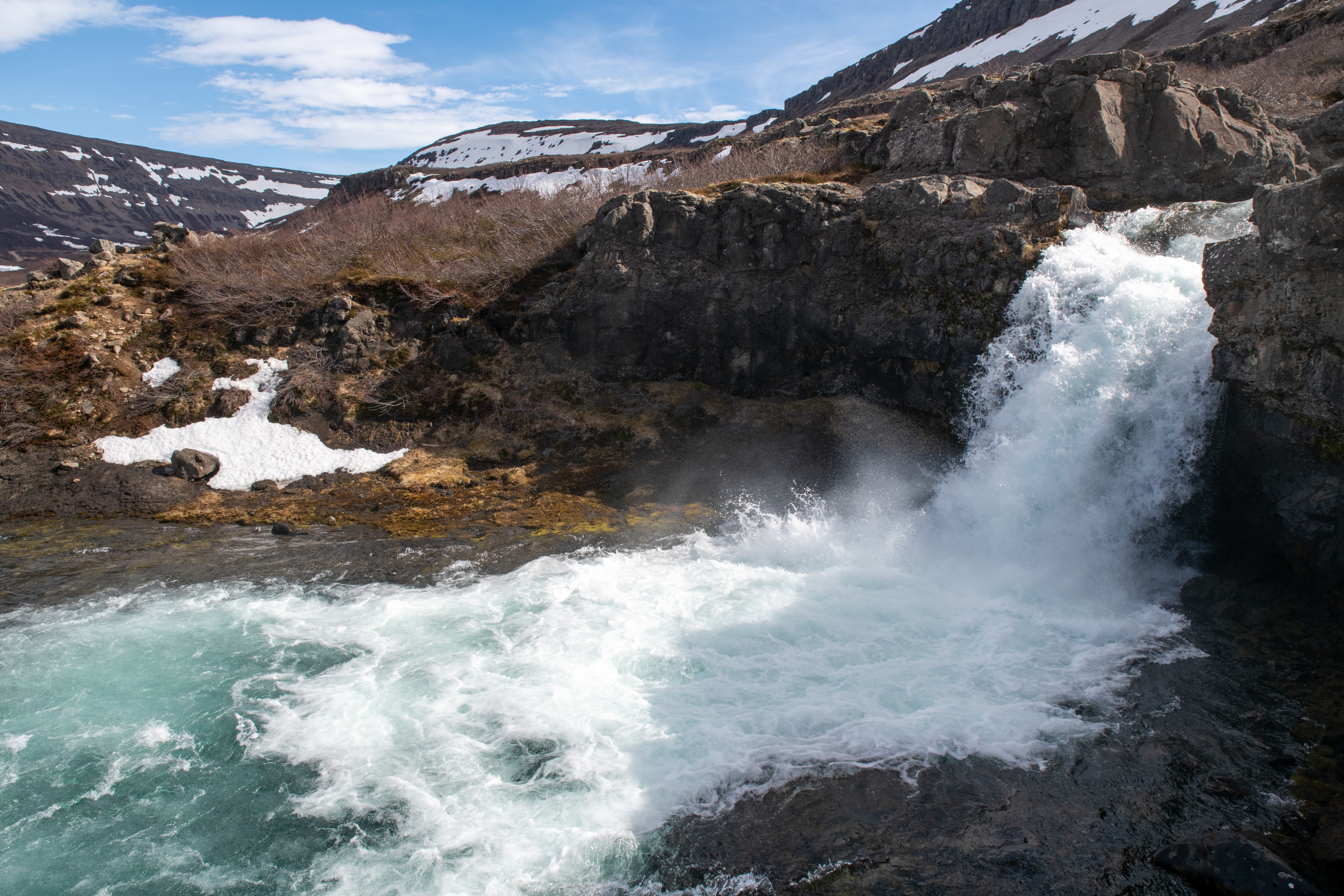
Göngumannafoss

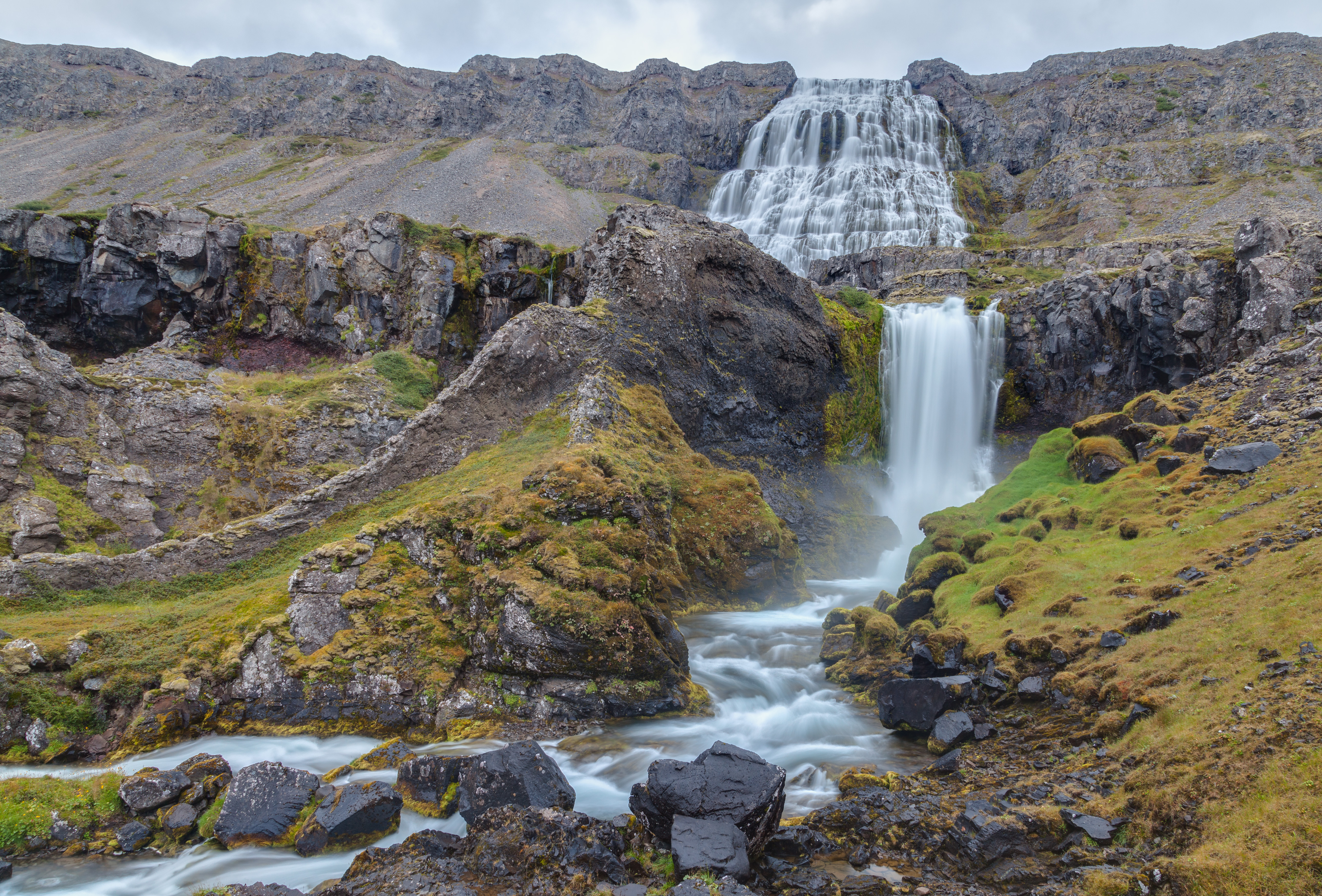
Strompgljúfrafoss

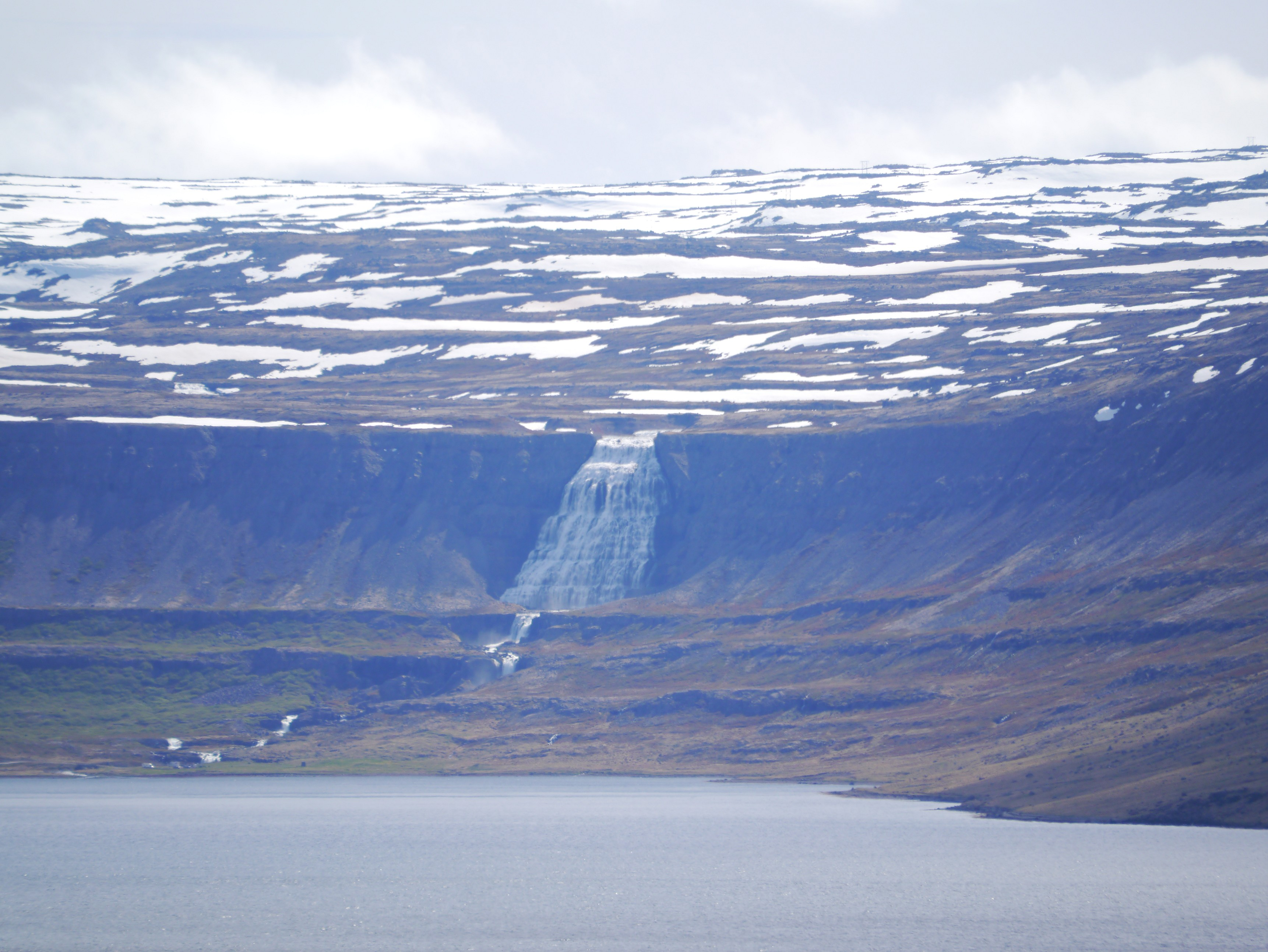
Dynjandi from far away

== See also ==
- List of waterfalls
