= Dynjandisheiði =

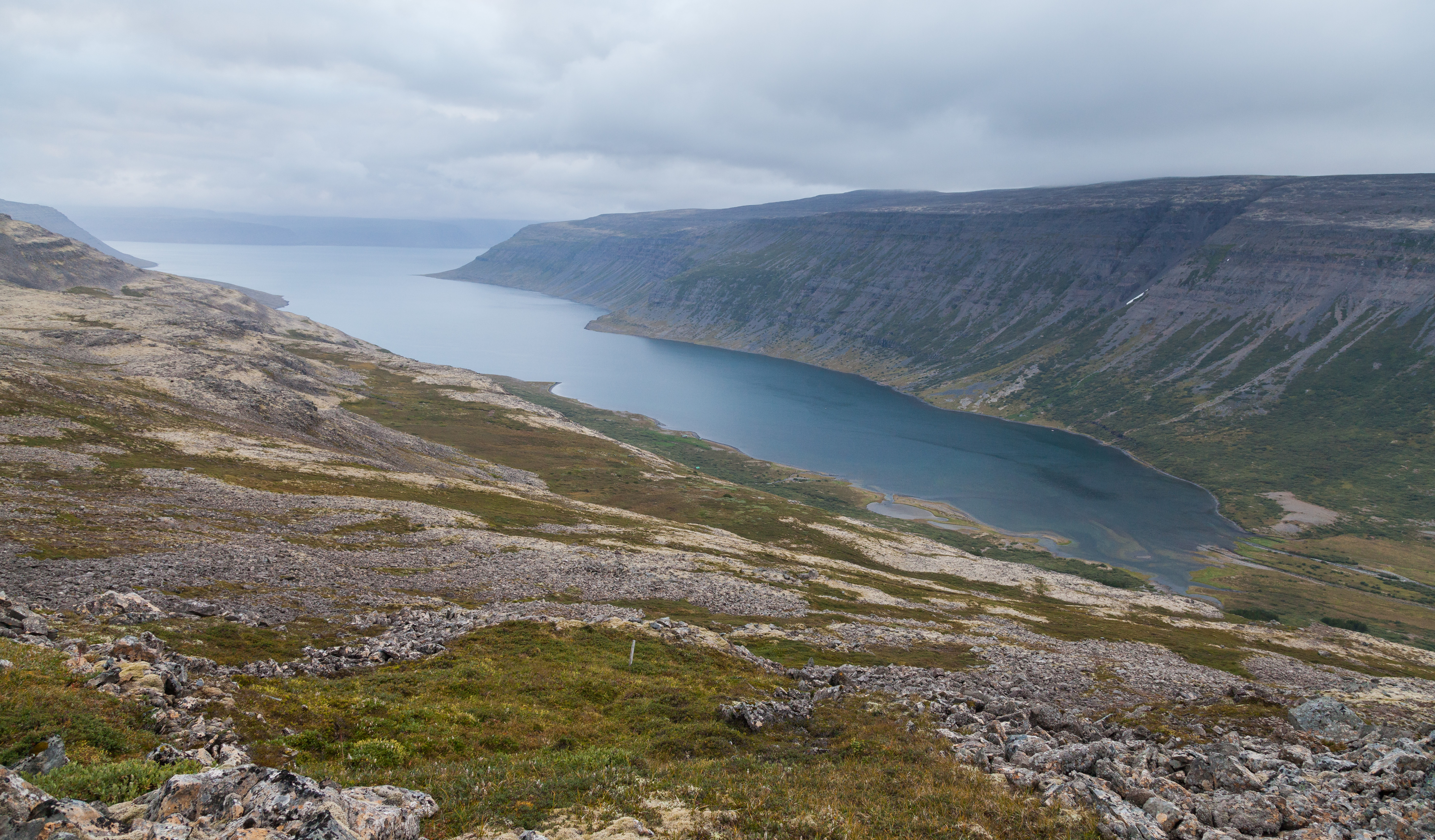
Looking down Geirþjófsfjörður from Dynjandisheiði.

Dynjandisheiði (Icelandic pronunciation: [ˈtɪnjantɪsˌheiːðɪ]) is a mountain pass in the Westfjords region of Iceland that runs between Arnarfjörður and Barðaströnd. The road over the pass has a maximum elevation of 500 metres (1,600 ft). The road was built over the pass in 1959 and was the first car-accessible road to Ísafjörður and the first connection between Ísafjörður and Barðaströnd. The pass is flat and snowy compared to the region as a whole.

== Proposed infrastructure ==
The Icelandic Road Administration has plans for a tunnel under Dynjandisheiði that would be 10.8 kilometres (6.7 mi) in length.

There have also been proposals to build a second road over the pass.
