= Ravi Sankaran =

Indian ornithologist

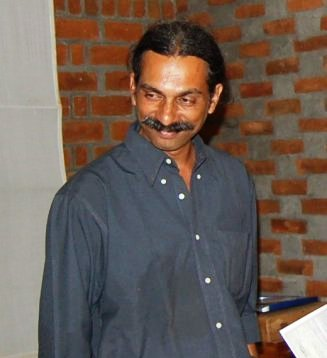
- Born: October 4, 1963
- Died: January 17, 2009, Coimbatore, India
- Education: Loyola College

Ravi Sankaran (4 October 1963 – 17 January 2009) was an Indian ornithologist whose work concerned the conservation of several threatened birds of India. He was the Director of the Salim Ali Centre for Ornithology and Natural History, Coimbatore, Tamil Nadu from 12-June-2008 till his death

== Education ==
Ravi studied at the Rishi Valley School, Madanapalli, Andhra Pradesh. He obtained a Bachelor of Science degree in Zoology from Loyola College, Chennai and a doctorate from Bombay Natural History Society. Ravi joined the Bombay Natural History Society (BNHS) in 1985 on the endangered species project concerning the great Indian bustard (Ardeotis nigriceps) and florican species (family Otididae). He assisted in developing recovery plans for these species. He also established Florican Watch, involving the local public.

== Career ==
Ravi Sankaran studied several endangered birds of the Andaman and Nicobar Islands. His work on the Narcondam hornbill, Nicobar megapode, and the edible-nest swiftlets aided the development of conservation management of these species. Ravi was also involved in a project Strengthening community conservation efforts in Nagaland: a programme to impart technical support on biodiversity conservation and livelihood options to communities, a collaborative programme between the Nagaland Empowerment of People through Economic Development, Kohima (NEPED), and SACON, in collaboration with other organisations such as Kalpavriksh, Pune; Ecosystems India, Guwahati; Aranayak, Assam; ATREE, Bangalore; and Nature Conservation Foundation, Mysore, funded by Sir Dorabji Tata Trust, Mumbai.

It had been stated that "Ravi’s life and work were marked by a deep passion for conservation of birds and natural areas, an unbridled exuberance and enthusiasm for his work, and the fire of a pioneer spirit that made him take on the most challenging, difficult and remote assignments. His well-honed field skills and adventurous exploits, wading into mangroves and walking the beaches, exploring caves and remote forests, enduring heat and cold in the desert, rain and flood in the rainforest, and battling multiple bouts of malaria, made him a legend among field biologists in India."

Ravi died in Coimbatore on 17 January 2009.

== Awards ==
For his work on the edible nest swiftlets in Andaman and Nicobar Islands Ravi Sankaran was awarded the WTI Endangered Species Award-2004.

== Publications ==
- Sankaran, R., 1995. Impact assessment of nest collection on the Edible-nest Swiftlet in the Nicobar Islands. Coimbatore: SACON Occasional Report 1.
- Sankaran, R., 1986. Sitting by a desert waterhole. Hornbill 1986 (2): 7–12.
- Sankaran, R., 1987. The Lesser Florican. Sanctuary Asia VII (1): 26–37.
- Sankaran, R., 1987. The vanishing bustards of India. Frontline.
- Sankaran, R., 1987. Back to Florican country. Hornbill 1987 (1): 22–25.
- Sankaran, R., 1991. Some aspects of the breeding behaviour of the Lesser Florican Sypheotides indica (J. F. Miller) and the Bengal Florican Houbaropsis bengalensis (Gmelin). Ph.D. Dissertation. Pp 265. Unpublished. Bombay: University of Bombay.
- Sankaran, R., 1994. Some aspects of the territorial system in Lesser Florican Sypheotides indica (J. F. Miller). J. Bombay Nat. Hist. Soc. 91 (2): 173–186.
- Sankaran, R., 1995. Impact assessment of nest collection on the Edible-nest Swiftlet in the Nicobar Islands. Combatore. Salim Ali Centre for Ornithology and Natural History.
- Sankaran, R., 1995. The distribution, status and conservation of the Nicobar Megapode Megapodius nicobariensis. Biological Conservation 72: 17–26.
- Sankaran, R., 1996a. Territorial displays of the Bengal Florican. J. Bombay Nat. Hist. Soc. 93 (2): 167–177.
- Sankaran, R., 1996b. Aerial display of the Lesser Florican. J. Bombay Nat. Hist. Soc. 93 (3): 401–410.
- Sankaran, R., 1997. The relation between bustard body size and display type. J. Bombay Nat. Hist. Soc. 94 (2): 403–406.
- Sankaran, R., 1998. An annotated list of the endemic avifauna of the Nicobar islands. Forktail 13: 17–22.
- Sankaran, R., & Rahmani, A. R., 1987. De-ticking by a Large Grey Shrike Lanius excubitor. J. Bombay Nat. Hist. Soc. 83 (Centenary Suppl.):210–211.
- Sankaran, R., Rahmani, A. R., & Ganguli-Lachungpa, U., 1992. The distribution and status of the Lesser Florican Sypheotides indica (J.F.Miller) in the Indian subcontinent. J. Bombay Nat. Hist. Soc. 89 (2):156–179.
- Sankaran, R., & Sivakuamr, K., 1999. Preliminary results of an ongoing study of the Nicobar Megapode Megapodius nicobariensis Blyth. Zoologische Verhandelingen, Leiden 327: 75–90.
- Sankaran, R., & Sivakuamr, K., 2002. New records of birds from the Andaman & Nicobar Islands. Forktail 18: 149–150.
- Sankaran, R., & Sivakuamr, K., 2003. The incubation mound and hatching success of the Nicobar Megapode Megapodius nicobariensis Blyth. J. Bombay Nat. Hist. Soc.100 (2&3): 375–387.
- Sankaran, R., & Sivakuamr, K., 2005a. Natural history notes on the chicks of the Nicobar Megapode Megapodius nicobariensis. J. Bombay Nat. Hist. Soc. 101(3): 452 [2004].
- Sankaran, R., & Sivakuamr, K., 2005b. The diet of the Nicobar Megapode Megapodius nicobariensis in Great Nicobar Island. J. Bombay Nat. Hist. Soc. 102 (1): 105–106.
- Sankaran, R., & Seshnararan, M. S., 2008. Conservation of the Edible-nest Swiftlet Collocalia fuciphaga in the Andaman and Nicobar Islands. Pp. 31. Sálim Ali Centre for Ornithology & Natural History.
- Vijayan, L. & Sankaran, R. 2000. A study on the ecology, status and conservation perspective of certain rare endemic avifauna of the Andaman and Nicobar Islands. Coimbatore: SACON. 165 pp.
