= 2012 in birding and ornithology =

See also 2011 in birding and ornithology, main events of 2012 and 2013 in birding and ornithology

The year 2012 in birding and ornithology.

== Worldwide ==
=== New species ===
See also Bird species new to science described in the 2010s (decade)

== Deaths ==
- Jeffery Boswall (20 March 1931 – 15 August 2012)

== Asia ==
=== Israel ===
- Israel's 5th European storm petrel (Hydrobates pelagicus) off Ashdod on 28 January
- Israel's 6th great shearwater (Ardenna gravis) off Haifa on 28 January

=== Kuwait ===
- Kuwait's second white wagtail (Motacilla alba) at Wafra Farms from 10 – 18 February.

== Europe ==
=== Denmark ===
- A black-winged kite (Elanus caeruleus) seen flying from Gilleleje north of Copenhagen towards Sweden on 29 April will be the 4th Danish record if accepted.
- A griffon vulture (Gyps fulvus) at Møllehus, Tønder on the Danish/German border on 14 July will be the 4th Danish record and first for 26 years.

=== Faroe Islands ===
- The Faroe Islands first Bonaparte's gull (Chroicocephalus philadelphia) at Sandágerði, Tórshavn on 11 January.

=== France ===
- An Oriental turtle dove, (Streptopelia orientalis ssp meena) at Lot-et-Garonne on 6 March; sixth record for France if accepted.

=== Gibraltar ===
- A tropical mockingbird (Mimus gilvus) at North Mole, Gibraltar first seen on 14 February. If accepted will be a first for the Western Palearctic. Originally identified as a northern mockingbird

=== Lithuania ===
- An adult male bufflehead (Bucephala albeola) at Limeikiai, Panevėžys on 26 April, will be the first for Lithuania if accepted.

=== Madeira ===
- Madeira's first American coot (Fulica americana) at Lugar de Baixo on 21 January.

=== Netherlands ===
- An adult black-winged kite (Elanus caeruleus) at Muiden, Zuidpolder on 29 April will be the 7th record for the Netherlands if accepted.

=== Sweden ===
- A griffon vulture (Gyps fulvus) just to the south of Gothenburg is the third for Sweden and the first since 2000 if accepted.
- Sweden's third dusky thrush (Turdus eunomus) at Nyköping, Södermanland on 14 January.

=== United Kingdom ===
- July – only the second brood of spoon-billed sandpiper (Calidris pygmaea) have hatched in captivity at the Wildfowl & Wetlands Trust's Slimbridge Wetland Centre as part of a breeding scheme to save the critically endangered species from extinction.

== North America ==
=== United States ===
- A pair of endangered short-tailed albatross (Phoebastria albatrus) have produced one chick on Midway Atoll for the second year running.
