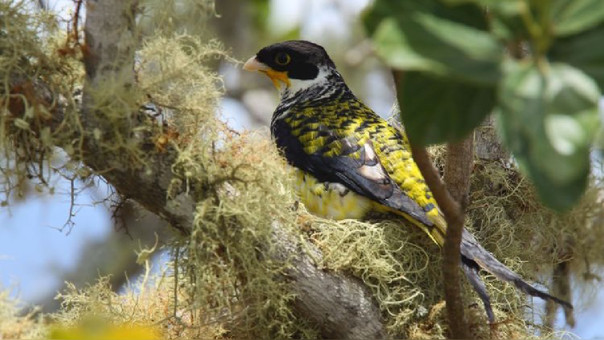
- male

Conservation status
- Endangered (IUCN 3.1)

Scientific classification
- Kingdom: Animalia
- Phylum: Chordata
- Class: Aves
- Order: Passeriformes
- Family: Cotingidae
- Genus: Phibalura
- Species: P. boliviana

Binomial name
- Phibalura boliviana Chapman, 1930

= Apolo cotinga =

Species of bird

The Apolo cotinga or palkachupa cotinga (Phibalura boliviana) is a passerine bird in the family Cotingidae. It is endemic to Bolivia.

== Taxonomy and systematics ==
The type specimen of the Apolo cotinga was collected in Bolivia in 1902 and in 1930 described as a subspecies of the swallow-tailed cotinga (Phibalura flavirostris boliviana). The bird was rediscovered in 2000 after 98 years without any records.

The Apolo cotinga's further taxonomy is unsettled. The IOC and BirdLife International's Handbook of the Birds of the World (HBW) follow the proposal in a 2011 paper and treat the taxon as a monotypic species. They assign it the English names Palkachupa cotinga and Apolo cotinga respectively. The paper cites differences from the swallow-tailed cotinga in the colors of this taxon's eye, bill, legs, and feet, in its longer tail, and in its vocalizations.

However, the South American Classification Committee (formerly part of the American Ornithological Society) and the Clements taxonomy retain the taxon as a subspecies of the swallow-tailed cotinga. They cite the relatively minor morphological differences between the two taxa. They confirmed their treatment following a large molecular phylogenetic study of the family Cotingidae published in 2014 that found only small differences between the DNA sequences of the two.

== Description ==
The Apolo cotinga is about 18 to 20 cm (7.1 to 7.9 in) long. The sexes have different plumage though both have the eponymous long divided tail. Adult females have a mottled black and gray forehead, a pale gray to grayish brown crown with a usually concealed dull red streak in the middle. Their nape is blackish with broken white bars. Their upperparts are mostly dull olive with bright yellow forming a scaly appearance; their uppertail coverts are mostly olive-yellow with dark streaks. Their wings are mostly blackish brown with an olive green wash and feather edges. Their tail's upper side is blackish brown and its underside grayish; the feathers have yellow edges whose size decreases from the inner ones to the outer. Their lores are mottled gray and blackish and their ear coverts variably gray to blackish with a very wide white stripe below them. Their throat is pale yellow with gray-brown spots. The rest of their underparts are blotchy white and yellow with brownish black to black tips on the feathers that form horizontal bars. Adult males are overall brighter and more boldly marked than females. Their crown is a dark navy blue with a mostly concealed crimson-red center. Their upperparts are yellowish to canary-yellow with navy blue barring. Their wings are deep bluish black with no olive wash. Their tail is black with less yellow than females' and its outer feathers are longer and more curved. Their lores and ear coverts are blackish blue and form a "mask". Their underparts are brighter yellow than females'. Both sexes have a mustard-yellow iris with bare red skin surrounding the eye. Their bill is very short with a wide base and is pale straw-colored, pinkish white, or white. Their legs and feet are orangey.

== Distribution and habitat ==
The Apolo cotinga is found only the vicinity of Apolo in western Bolivia. It inhabits the eastern foothills of the Andes in semi-humid forest, savanna, and forest fragments between 1,300 and 2,040 m (4,300 and 6,700 ft).

== Behavior ==
=== Movement ===
The Apolo cotinga is a year-round resident in its small range.

=== Feeding ===
The Apolo cotinga feeds mostly on fruit and also includes small numbers of insects in its diet. It sometimes forages in small flocks, and mostly in the forest's canopy but sometimes much nearer the ground. It takes food mostly by gleaning while perched and also takes insects with short sallies.

=== Breeding ===
The Apolo cotinga breeds between September and March. Both sexes build the nest, a shallow cup made mostly of lichens with a few twigs included which is typically placed in the fork of a branch or on a wide horizontal branch. The clutch size is two eggs that are pastel green or greenish blue with brownish red spots and lines. Both sexes incubate the clutch though apparently only the female does so at night. The incubation period is 17 to 19 days and fledging appears to occur about two weeks after hatch. Both sexes brood and provision nestlings.

=== Vocalization ===
The Apolo cotinga is more vocal than the swallow-tailed cotinga sensu stricto, with one song and five calls known. The vocalizations are "not very well described" and highly variable.

== Status ==
The IUCN has assessed the Apolo cotinga as Endangered. It has a very small range and its estimated population of between 400 and 530 mature individuals is believed to be decreasing. "Forest cover in the Apolo area has been drastically reduced over the past century and losses are continuing owing to large-scale clearance and burning for cattle ranching and agriculture...The species is almost absent from highly disturbed localities."
