= Whimbrel =

Whimbrel may refer to:

Birds:

- Eurasian whimbrel (common), Numenius phaeopus
- Hudsonian whimbrel, Numenius hudsonicus
- Bristle-thighed curlew, Numenius tahitiensis

Other uses:

- HMS Whimbrel (U29), last surviving Royal Navy warship present at the Japanese surrender in World War II
