= 2010 in birding and ornithology =

See also 2009 in birding and ornithology, main events of 2010 and 2011 in birding and ornithology

'

The year 2010 in birding and ornithology.

== Worldwide ==
=== New species ===
See also Bird species new to science described in the 2000s

- Limestone leaf warbler, Phylloscopus calciatilis: Alström, P.; Davidson, P.; Duckworth, J.W.; Eames, J.C.; Le, T.T.; Nguyen, C.; Olsson, U.; Robson, C.; Timmins, R. (2010). "Description of a new species of Phylloscopus warbler from Vietnam and Laos". Ibis. 152 (1): 145–168. doi:10.1111/j.1474-919X.2009.00990.x.
- Fenwick's antpitta or Urrao antpitta, Grallaria fenwickorum: Barrera, L.F.; Bartels, A.; Fundación ProAves de Colombia (2010). "A new species of Antpitta (family Grallariidae) from the Colibrí del Sol Bird Reserve, Colombia". Conservación Colombiana. 13: 8–24.
- Socotra buzzard, Buteo socotraensis: Porter, R.F.; Kirwan, G.M. (2010). "Studies of Socotran birds VI. The taxonomic status of the Socotra Buzzard". Bull. Brit. Orn. Club. 130 (2): 116–131.
- Willard's sooty boubou, Laniarius willardi: Voelker, G.; Outlaw, R.K.; Reddy, S.; Tobler, M.; Bates, J.M.; Hackett, S.J.; Kahindo, C.; Marks, B.D.; Kerbis Peterhans, J.C.; Gnoske, T.P. (2010). "A New Species of Boubou (Malaconotidae: Laniarius) from the Albertine Rift". Auk. 127 (3): 678–689. doi:10.1525/auk.2010.09014. S2CID 15031325.
- Rock tapaculo, Scytalopus petrophilus: Whitney, B.M.; Vasconcelos, M.F.; Silveira, L.F.; Pacheco, J.F. (2010). "Scytalopus petrophilus (Rock Tapaculo): a new species from Minas Gerais, Brazil". Revista Brasileira de Ornitologia. 18 (2): 73–88.

== Europe ==
=== Britain ===
==== Breeding birds ====
Purple heron (Ardea purpurea) successfully bred in the UK for the first time on the Dungeness peninsula in Kent.
