= Lugar de Baixo =

- village
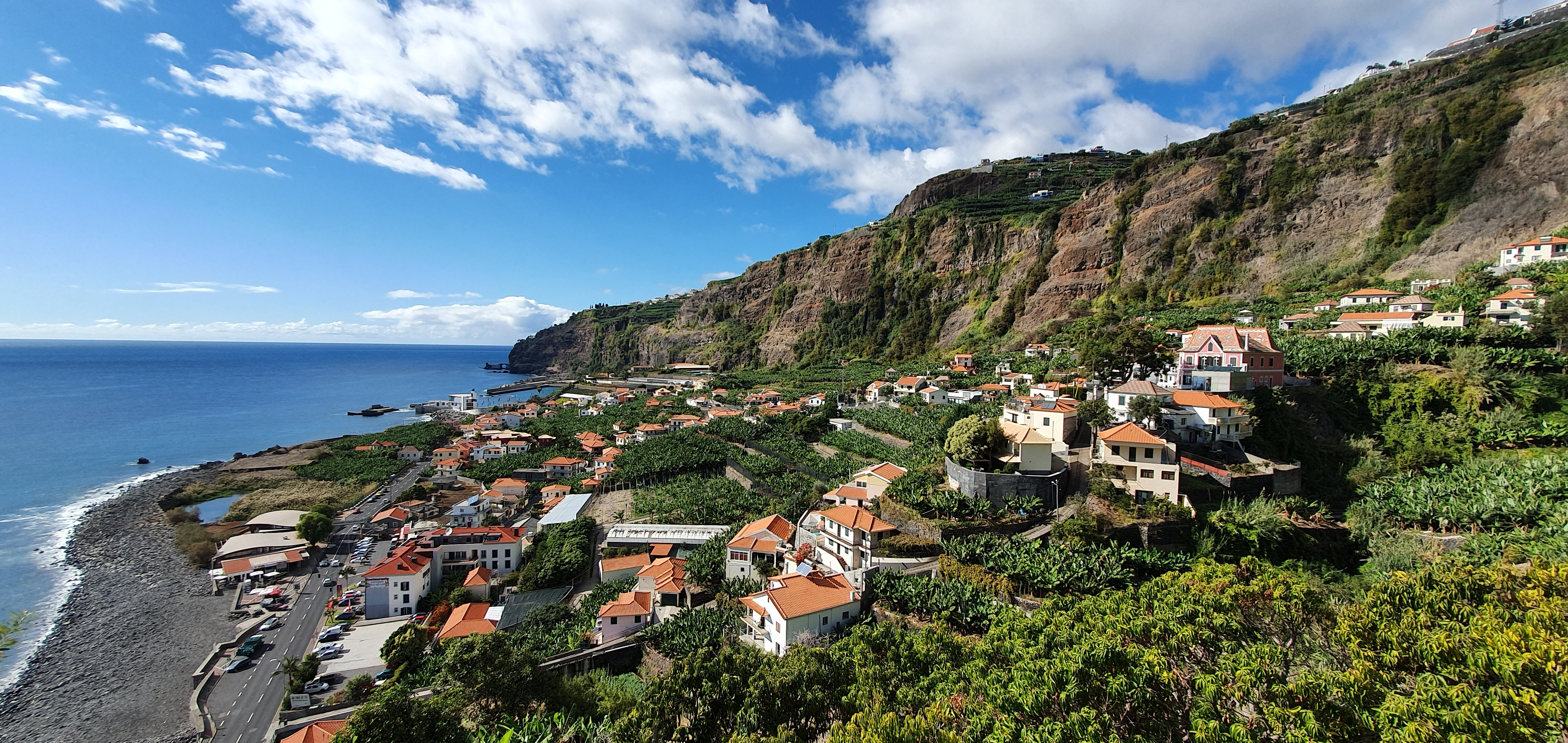
- Lugar de Baixo viewed from the east cliff

- Location in Madeira
- Coordinates: 32°40′48″N 17°5′2″W
- Country: Portugal
- Autonomous Region: Madeira
- Island: Madeira
- Municipality: Ponta do Sol
- Parish: Ponta do Sol

Area
  - Total: 0.47 km^{2} (0.18 sq mi)
- Elevation: 15 m (49 ft)

Population (2011)
  - Total: 336
  - Density: 710/km^{2} (1,900/sq mi)
- Postal code: 9360-501
- Area code: 291
- Patron Saint: Santo António

Sítio do Lugar de Baixo (Portuguese for bottom place) is a sea village in the municipality of Ponta do Sol in the Portuguese archipelago of Madeira. The population in 2011 was 336, in an area of 0.47 km^{2}. It is approximately 15 kilometres (9.32 mi) west of Funchal.

== History ==
This coastal platform was formed in the year 1803 by a massive cliff slide into the ocean. The origin of the toponymy Lugar de Baixo is linked to this event when a part of the Lombada locality slid down forming the low sea platform.

== Geography ==
This village on the south-west coast of Madeira is a natural amphitheater fronting the Atlantic Ocean to the south and steep rock cliffs to the north. Man-made stone walls terraces of volcanic soil shape the landscape. The waves break large and surfing is enjoyed here by experienced surfers.

== Economy ==
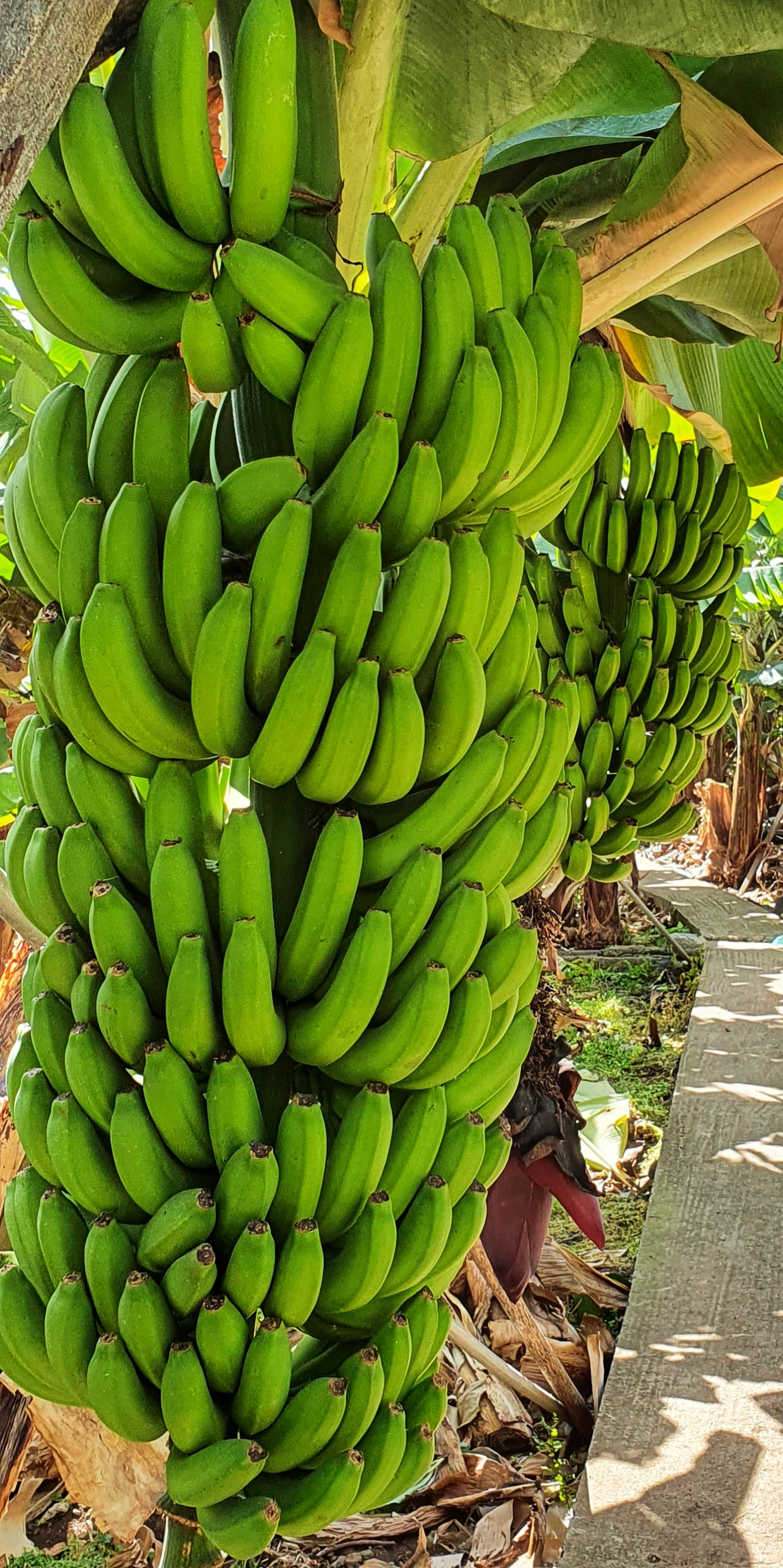
Large banana bunches near a levada footpath (Vereda)

The main activities in the community are the cultivation of bananas, flowers, and tourism. Much of the land along the cliff faces is occupied by terraced fields with rows of banana trees. This sun-drenched and fertile coastal platform produces bananas, mango, and papayas that are reputed to be the best on the island.

== Climate ==
Lugar de Baixo has a warm year-round Mediterranean climate (Köppen: Csa) with an average winter daily max of 20 °C (68 °F) and low of 13.5 °C (56.3 °F). The most extreme temperatures recorded during the 1961-1990 period were 8.0 °C (46.4 °F) on February, and 36.4 °C (97.5 °F) on August. Its climate is believed to be the warmest of any other place in Madeira with a climatic station. The average annual temperature from 1961 to 2009 averages 20.5 °C (68.9 °F), 24.4 °C (75.9 °F) during the day and 16.5 °C (61.7 °F) at night. In recent years (such as 2016 or 2020), none of the average monthly temperatures got down below 18 °C (64 °F), putting its climate close to tropical savanna.

Climate data for Lugar de Baixo, 1961-1990
Month	Jan	Feb	Mar	Apr	May	Jun	Jul	Aug	Sep	Oct	Nov	Dec	Year
Mean daily maximum °C (°F)	19.9 (67.8)	19.8 (67.6)	20.0 (68.0)	20.3 (68.5)	21.8 (71.2)	23.0 (73.4)	25.0 (77.0)	26.3 (79.3)	26.0 (78.8)	24.6 (76.3)	22.8 (73.0)	20.6 (69.1)	22.5 (72.5)
Daily mean °C (°F)	16.9 (62.4)	16.6 (61.9)	17.0 (62.6)	17.4 (63.3)	18.5 (65.3)	20.2 (68.4)	21.9 (71.4)	22.9 (73.2)	22.9 (73.2)	21.5 (70.7)	19.6 (67.3)	17.7 (63.9)	19.4 (67.0)
Mean daily minimum °C (°F)	13.9 (57.0)	13.4 (56.1)	14.0 (57.2)	14.5 (58.1)	15.2 (59.4)	17.4 (63.3)	18.8 (65.8)	19.5 (67.1)	19.8 (67.6)	18.4 (65.1)	16.4 (61.5)	14.8 (58.6)	16.3 (61.4)
Average precipitation mm (inches)	109.3 (4.30)	83.2 (3.28)	70.0 (2.76)	35.4 (1.39)	21.5 (0.85)	14.4 (0.57)	2.1 (0.08)	4.4 (0.17)	34.3 (1.35)	85.2 (3.35)	91.8 (3.61)	103.8 (4.09)	655.4 (25.8)
Average relative humidity (%)	70	70	69	68	70	72	73	72	71	70	69	69	70
Source: IPMA

Climate data for Lugar de Baixo, 2012-2019
Month	Jan	Feb	Mar	Apr	May	Jun	Jul	Aug	Sep	Oct	Nov	Dec	Year
Daily mean °C (°F)	18.3 (64.9)	17.6 (63.7)	18.0 (64.4)	18.7 (65.7)	20.2 (68.4)	22.2 (72.0)	23.8 (74.8)	24.8 (76.6)	24.4 (75.9)	23.0 (73.4)	20.6 (69.1)	19.3 (66.7)	20.9 (69.6)
Average precipitation mm (inches)	36.2 (1.43)	44.0 (1.73)	57.6 (2.27)	56.8 (2.24)	14.5 (0.57)	13.0 (0.51)	2.5 (0.10)	1.0 (0.04)	30.8 (1.21)	95.2 (3.75)	108.6 (4.28)	41.9 (1.65)	502.1 (19.78)
Source: IPMA

== Places of interest ==
=== Lagoa do Lugar de Baixo ===
A tidal lagoon where many species of migratory birds use it as a breeding ground or stopping point. The visitor center next to the lagoon is currently closed to the public. In 2003, the Madeiran government began a program of coastal engineering. This is when the current sea rock berm protecting the lagoon was built consisting of large rocks fixed to the shoreline. This has a negative impact on the surf tube wave which used to stay open for 100 meters or more.

=== Palacete dos Zinos ===
Also known as Palacete do Lugar de Baixo. Currently operating as a boutique 9 rooms hotel under the name of 1905 Zino's Palace. It was renovated in 2019 and opened to the public at the beginning of 2020. It is one of the few romantic buildings in Madeira, exemplifying the archipelago's rich architectural heritage. It was built in the late 19th century as a summer home for the Zino family, taking advantage of the excellent climate of the area.
