= 2006 in birding and ornithology =

The year 2006 in birding and ornithology.

== Worldwide ==
=== New species ===
See also Bird species new to science described in the 2000s

=== Ornithologists ===
==== Deaths ====
- 12 January - René de Naurois
- 22 September - Tommy Garnett
- 2 October - George A. Bartholomew
- 10 October - Mike Rogers
- 18 October - Ronald Hickling
- 23 November - Paul Géroudet
- 8 December - John Kenneth Terres
- ? - Tatsuo Utagawa

== Europe ==
=== Britain ===
==== Rare birds ====
- A large influx of cattle egrets occurs in January, including a flock of eight in Sussex
- Britain's first long-billed murrelet is found in Devon in November

=== Ireland ===
==== Rare birds ====
- Ireland's first cirl bunting is found in Co. Cork
- Ireland's first Canada warbler is found in Co. Clare
- Ireland's second Baltimore oriole, second isabelline shrike and second hermit thrush are all found in Co. Cork

=== Scandinavia ===
To be completed

== North America ==
To be completed
