= Florican =

Florican may refer to birds of the bustard family:

- Bengal florican (Houbaropsis bengalensis)
- Lesser florican (Sypheotides indica)
