= Paul Géroudet =

Swiss ornithologist

Paul Géroudet (1917–2006) was a notable Swiss ornithologist. He was the chief editor of Nos Oiseaux from 1939 to 1994.
