= Arnarfjörður =

Large fjord in the Westfjords region of Iceland

Coordinates: 65°45′N 23°40′W

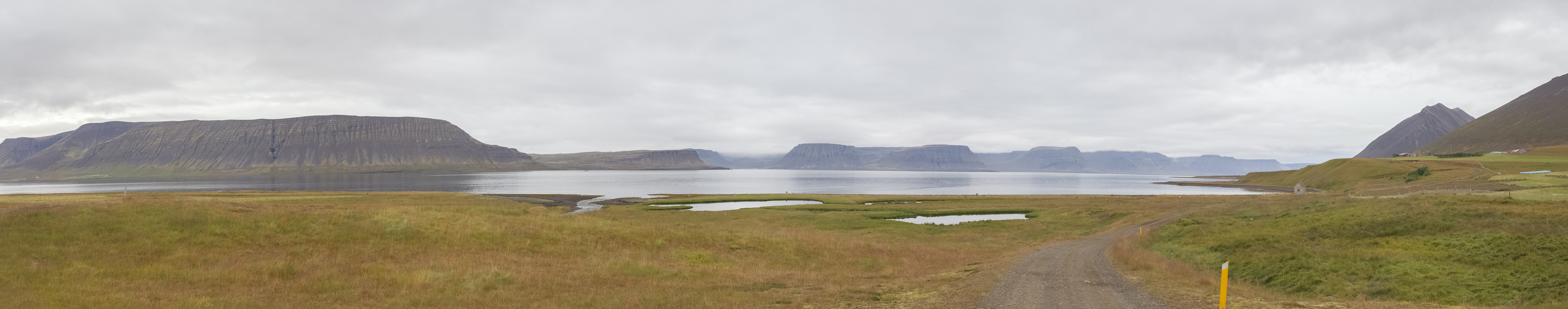
Panoramic view of Arnarfjörður

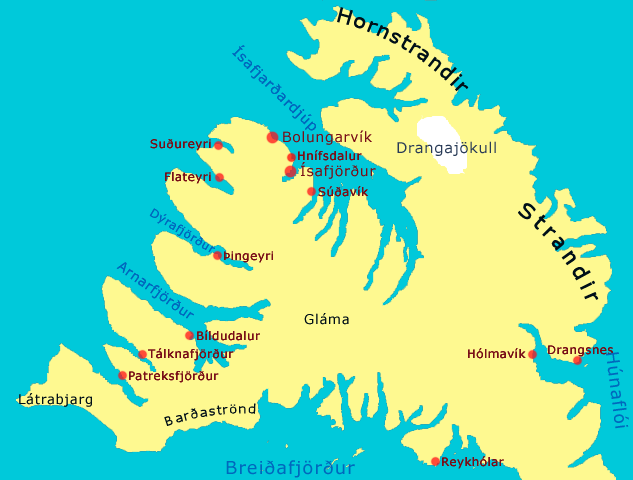
Overview of all Westfjords

Arnarfjörður (Icelandic pronunciation: [ˈa(r)tnarˌfjœrðʏr̥]) is a large fjord in the Westfjords region of Iceland. "Arnar" is the genitive case of "Örn" ([ˈœ(r)tn̥]), the name of the first settler of the fjord.

== Description ==
The fjord is 30 km (19 mi) long and 5 to 10 km (3 to 6 mi) wide, and is oriented NW/SE. It branches into two main bays, each containing a few coves. They are Borgarfjörður to the east and Suðurfirðir to the south. The largest settlement on the fjord is the small village of Bíldudalur. Lowland strips along the bay are very limited, with mountain slopes falling steeply into the sea in most places. The Westfjords' highest mountain, Kaldbakur, is also located between Arnarfjörður and the neighboring Dýrafjörður, a parallel fjord to the north-east.

== Legends ==
According to folklore, the fjord is said to house the most sea monsters of all the country's fjords, and to have many sorcerers.
