= 2005 in birding and ornithology =

The year 2005 in birding and ornithology.

== Worldwide ==
=== New species ===
See Bird species new to science described in the 2000s.

=== Rediscoveries ===
In April, an announcement is made that the ivory-billed woodpecker has been rediscovered in North America; in July, doubt is cast on this claim. The debate remains unresolved.

=== Extinctions ===
The thick-billed ground dove (Pampusana salamonis), last seen in 1927, is officially declared extinct.

=== Taxonomic developments ===
- The British Ornithologists' Union Records Committee announce that they have adopted the following species split:
  - Common scoter and black scoter
  - Velvet scoter and white-winged scoter
  - Canada goose and cackling goose
  - Yellow-legged gull (split from herring gull)

=== Ornithologists ===
==== Deaths ====
- 3 February - Ernst Mayr (born 1904)
- 25 February - Tony Norris (born 1917)
- 23 May – Derek Ratcliffe (born 1929)
- 9 June - James F. Clements (born 1927)
- 3 September - R. S. R. Fitter (born 1913)

=== World listing ===
- American Peter Kaestner becomes the fourth person ever to see over 8000 species of bird alive.

== Europe ==
=== Britain ===
==== Breeding birds ====
- A pair of European bee-eaters makes a nesting attempt in Herefordshire - see Bee-eaters in Britain

==== Migrant and wintering birds ====
- The first part of the year sees a large influx of waxwings into southern England.

==== Rare birds ====
- Britain's third belted kingfisher was found on 1 April in Staffordshire, and was later seen briefly in east Yorkshire, then in Northeast Scotland; the last was in 1980.
- Britain's second Barrow's goldeneye was found in May in Northeast Scotland.
- Britain's second Audouin's gull was seen briefly at Spurn, east Yorkshire on 1 June.
- An influx of trumpeter finches in Kent and Suffolk in the spring are the first of this species to be seen in Britain since the early 1990s.
- A sooty tern visited the Anglesey tern colonies in North Wales in July - the first ever in Britain to be seen by large numbers of birders.
- Britain's first Swinhoe's storm petrel on a pelagic, 17 km south of the Isles of Scilly on 21 July.
- A yellow warbler on Unst, Shetland in September is Britain's fifth.
- A Siberian rubythroat on Fair Isle, Shetland in October is also Britain's fifth.
- Britain's first magnificent frigatebird is found moribund in Whitchurch, Shropshire following Hurricane Wilma, and dies in care at Chester Zoo
- Britain's fifth green heron is found on Anglesey in November
- Hurricane Wilma also brought an unprecedented influx of laughing gulls to Britain during November

==== Other Events ====
- The British Birdwatching Fair has Myanmar as its theme for the year.

=== Ireland ===
==== Rare birds ====
- Ireland's first green heron is found in County Cork in October
- Ireland's first Barrow's goldeneye is found at Quoile Pondage in County Down in November
