= René de Naurois =

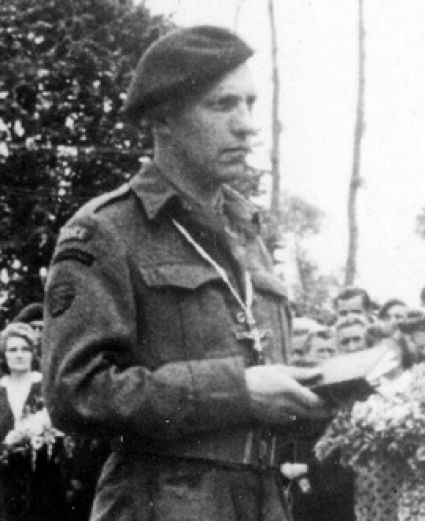
The abbé de Naurois, chaplain among the Kieffer Commandos in 1944.

Abbé René de Naurois (24 November 1906 – 12 January 2006) was a French Catholic priest, chaplain, and ornithologist.

== Second World War ==
During the Second World War Naurois assisted the French Resistance, helped organise the escape of Jews from occupied France to Switzerland and Spain. He himself escaped from Vichy via Barcelona, Gibraltar arriving at Liverpool, and was one of the 177 Kieffer Commandos who took part in the Normandy Landings on 6 June 1944. Honours received by de Naurois for his wartime activities include the Ordre de la Libération and the title of Righteous among the Nations.

== Ornithology ==
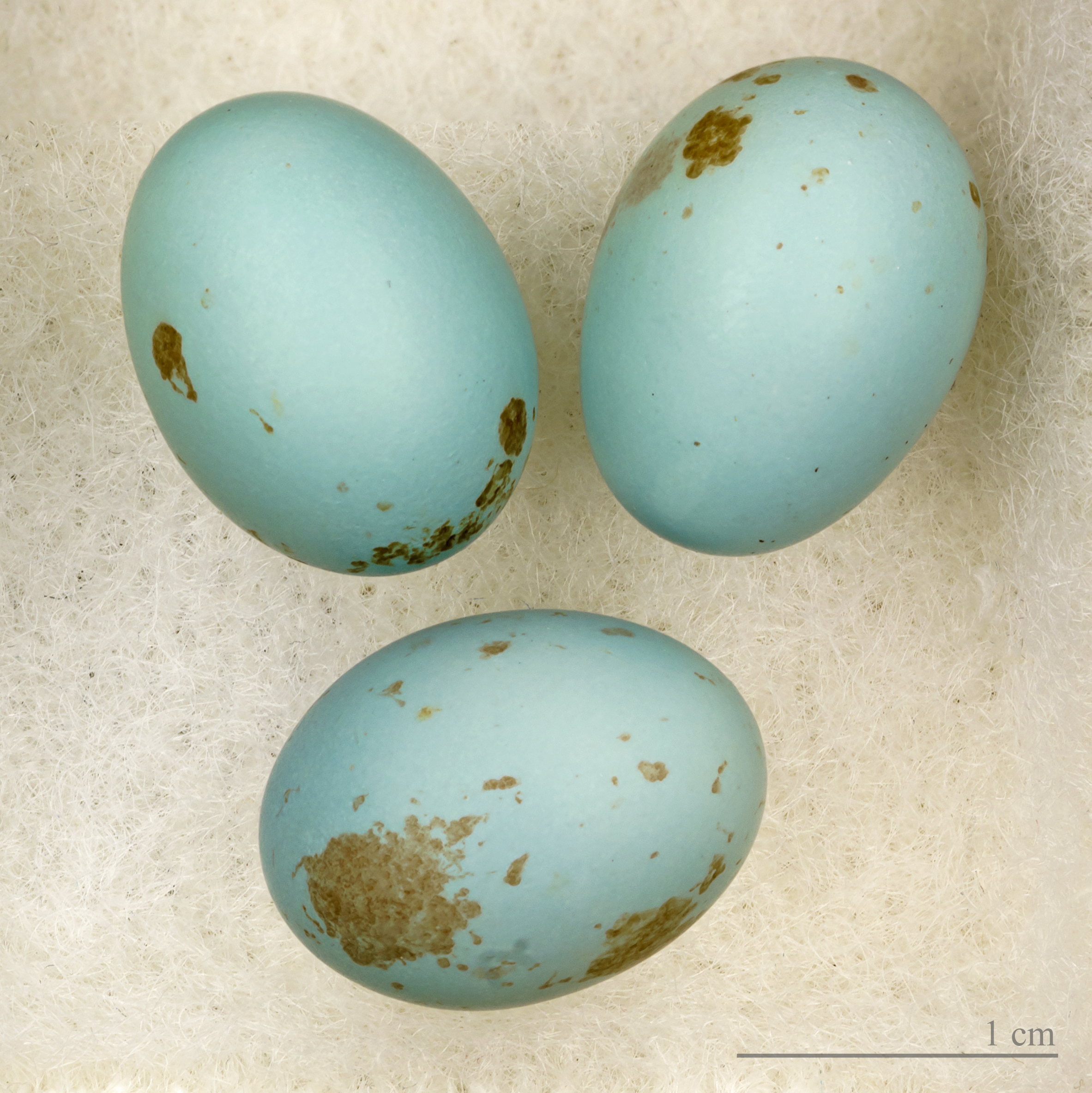
Eggs of Cisticola anonymus collected by René de Naurois - MHNT

Following the war Naurois became involved in ornithology, especially of the coast of West Africa and its offshore islands. His doctoral thesis, which he defended in 1969 at the age of 63, was titled "Populations and breeding cycles of birds of the western coast of Africa from Cape Barbas, Spanish Sahara to the frontier of the Republic of Guinea".

== Publications ==
As well as numerous papers in the scientific literature, books authored or coauthored by Naurois include:

- 1994 – Les oiseaux des iles du Golfe de Guinee: Sao Tome, Prince et Annobon. Ministerio do Planeamento e da Administracao do Territorio, Secretaria de Estado da Ciencia e Tecnologia, Instituto de Investigacao Cientifica Tropical. ISBN 978-972-672-629-6. (In French and Portuguese).
- 2004 – Aumônier de la France Libre - Mémoires. (With Jean Chaunu). Éditions Perrin. ISBN 2-262-02118-X
