= Pulletop Nature Reserve =

Protected area in New South Wales, Australia

- IUCN category Ia (strict nature reserve)
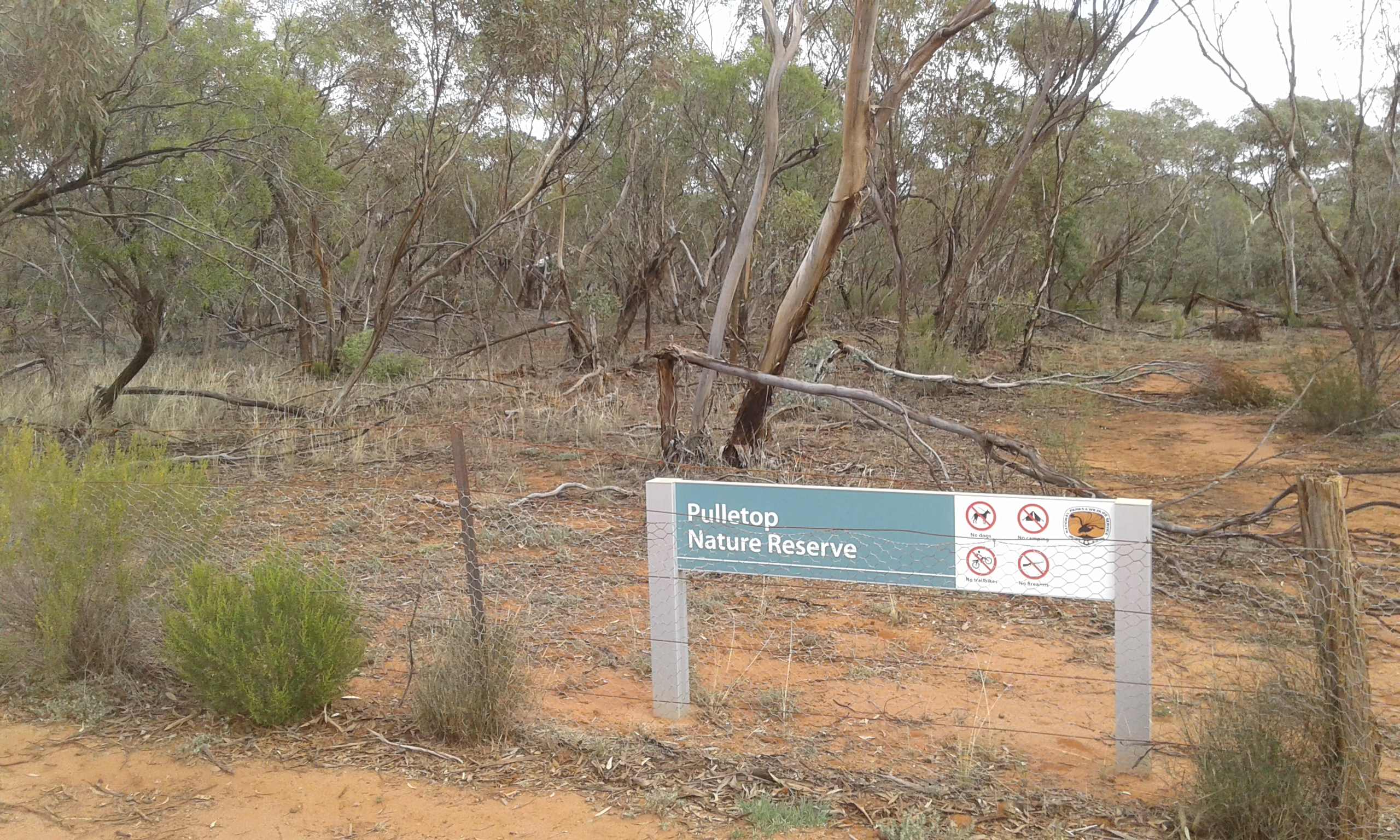
- Entrance sign, Pulletop Nature Reserve

- Location within New South Wales
- Location: New South Wales
- Nearest city: Rankins Springs
- Coordinates: 33°58′04.9″S 146°04′38.2″E
- Area: 1.45 km^{2} (0.56 sq mi)
- Established: 18 January 1963
- Governing body: NSW National Parks & Wildlife Service
- Website: Official website

Pulletop Nature Reserve is a protected nature reserve, located in the Cobar Peneplain region of New South Wales, in eastern Australia. The 145 ha (360-acre) reserve is located approximately 38 km (24 mi) north of Griffith, and 22 km (14 mi) southwest of Rankins Springs.

== History ==
The reserve lies within Wiradjuri country, however the history of Aboriginal use of the reserve is unknown. There are significant Aboriginal sites in Cocoparra National Park, which is located 10 km (6.2 mi) east of Pulletop Nature Reserve, and it is thought that hunting would have occurred throughout the mallee country around Cocoparra National Park, which would include Pulletop Nature Reserve.

The reserve was formerly part of a privately owned property that was progressively cleared in the 1950s for sheep and crop production. From 1951 to 1960, Australian ornithologist Harry Frith used the area of the reserve to study the ecology and behaviour of a small number of malleefowl. Frith's research led him to publish nine scientific papers and a book — The Mallee-Fowl: The Bird that Builds an Incubator (1962) — which focused on the breeding, distribution, predation and conservation of mallefowl.

By 1956 the area of the reserve had become isolated from other areas of mallee. Steps to preserve the area to conserve habitat for the malleefowl began in December 1960, when 145 hectares was withdrawn from sale from Homestead Farm. In January 1963, the area was dedicated as Pulletop Faunal Reserve, renamed to Pulletop Nature Reserve in 1967.

== Environment ==
The nature reserve has a flat to very gently undulating topography, with no watercourses or drainage lines. The soils of the area are highly permeable, with any precipitation absorbed rapidly.

=== Flora ===
The dominant vegetation type of the reserve is tall shrubland to low woodland dominated by multistemmed mallee eucalypts. The woodland within the reserve consists mostly of four mallee species: white mallee, narrow-leaved red mallee, red mallee, and yorrell. Other large tree species present within the reserve include bimble box.

Other native plant species recorded within the reserve include broombush, mallee pine, streaked wattle, desert quandong, wedge-leaf hop-bush, smooth wallaby-bush, spinifex, small-flowered wallaby-grass, tall feather-grass, annual bluebell, five-minute grass, dwarf greenhood, blue fingers, pink fingers, and blunt greenhood.

=== Fauna ===
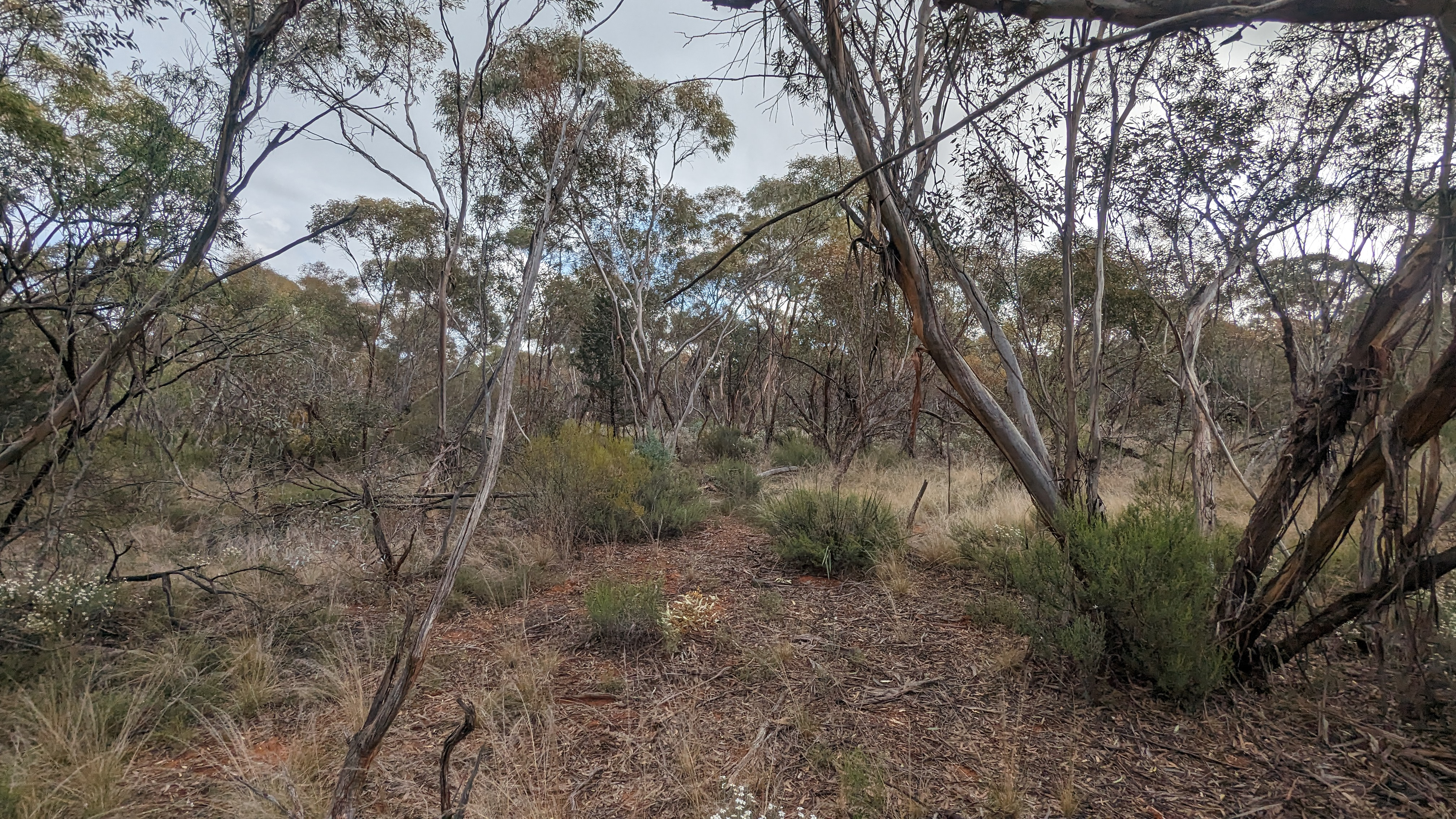
View of the mallee scrub, Pulletop Nature Reserve

Mammal species recorded within the nature reserve include eastern grey kangaroo, western grey kangaroo, short-beaked echidna, and slender-tailed dunnart. Reptiles and amphibians recorded in the reserve include sand goanna, shingleback skink, common bluetongue, pobblebonk and spotted marsh frog.

123 mallee and woodland bird species have been recorded within the reserve, with commonly sighted species including weebill, spiny-cheeked honeyeater, white-eared honeyeater, yellow-plumed honeyeater, grey shrikethrush, Australian ringneck and greater bluebonnet. At least 14 bird species listed under the Biodiversity Conservation Act 2016 have been recorded within the reserve. Mallefowl, red-lored whistler, and southern scrub robin were present in the reserveuntil the mid to late 1980s, but are now considered to be locally extinct. Similarly, chestnut quail-thrush, Gilbert's whistler, and shy heathwren also appear to have declined and, if still present in the reserve, occur in very low numbers.

Introduced pest species found within the reserve include European rabbit, brown hare, European fox, and feral cat.

== See also ==
- Protected areas of New South Wales
