= Trounson =

Trounson is a surname. Notable people with the surname include:

- Alan Trounson (born 1946), Australian biologist, pioneer of in vitro fertilisation; Emeritus Professor, Monash University and President of the California Institute for Regenerative Medicine
- Donald Trounson (1905-2009), British diplomat and Australian bird photographer
- James Trounson, original owner of the forest that became Trounson Kauri Park, Northland Region, New Zealand
