= National Photographic Index of Australian Wildlife =

The National Photographic Index of Australian Wildlife was founded as a project of the Australian Museum on 3 June 1969 (as the National Photographic Index of Australian Birds) to compile a comprehensive collection of photographs of Australian bird species. The founder, Donald Trounson, served as the project’s chief executive officer until 1981, when he was succeeded by Ronald Strahan. It was established in association with the National Library of Australia under the direction of a trust chaired by Sir Percy Spender and was the first systematic attempt to compile a comprehensive photographic record of the birds of any country. In 1977 it was expanded to include mammals and, in 1984, reptiles and frogs, with the aim of progressively including other animal groups to become the most comprehensive possible archive of photographs of Australian wildlife and to provide an expanding service to the public, to photographers and to biological science. In November 1980 the Index was incorporated as a part of the Australian Museum and the trust dissolved.

== Publications ==
During the first ten years of the project some 20,000 photographs of birds alone were submitted to the Index. Images were evaluated by independent selection panels and assessed under three criteria: scientific value, technical quality and artistic appeal. The existence of the Index collections has stimulated the production of high quality illustrated books on the Australian fauna, including the Reader's Digest Complete Book of Australian Birds in 1976, The Australian Museum Complete Book of Australian Mammals in 1983, and Jim Flegg's Photographic Field Guide: Birds of Australia in 1995.

=== Birds of Australia series ===
The publication principally associated with the Index is a series of ten volumes on Australian birds published from 1982 to 1996. It was conceived by Donald Trounson as a photographic equivalent of John Gould’s Birds of Australia. Ronald Strahan, who was editor-in-chief of Volumes 3-10 says in his editorial foreword to the third volume:

”So many books are published on the avifauna of Australia that one needs a good excuse for adding to the list. I have no difficulty or misgivings in justifying our publications, for they are a means of bringing to the public some of the treasures of the Australian Museum’s National Photographic Index of Australian Wildlife. Established sixteen years ago as a primarily scientific reference, the Index has become a unique collection of the best work of Australia’s most distinguished wildlife photographers and, almost inevitably, its informative content is inextricable from beauty. In deliberate emulation of John Gould who, more than a century ago, based The Birds of Australia upon a collection of elegant lithographs, our books are based upon illustrations of birds that have been captured in action by the camera. The illustrations come first and the text is a digressive commentary aimed at readers who may have no commitment to birds. This is not to say that we eschew detail or accuracy; merely that we put details aside into synopses for consultation by those who require such information. Our “Twentieth-century Gould” is designed as much for dipping into as for reading.”

Strahan says in his foreword to the final volume in the series:

”In addition to creating an administrative basis for the project, Trounson’s main contribution was to recruit a uniquely comprehensive photographic coverage of the birds of Australia, calling upon the resources of virtually every wildlife photographer – professional or amateur – in the nation.”

”Altogether, some 40 people have been responsible for the creation of the series, which comprises almost 4000 pages. Vincent Serventy edited the first two volumes, while I have had the honour, and travail, of supervising the remainder.”

”Donald Trounson was highly skilled in raising funds from government and corporate sources. He also obtained support from individual donors by introducing an arrangement whereby illustrations could be sponsored in return for tax-exempt donations. The project remains indebted to these sponsors, many of whom expressed their faith more than a decade ago and have had the patience to see it gradually come to fruition. With the conclusion of this enterprise, it can be said with some confidence that nothing of its size and scope, based on photographs, is likely to be produced for a long while.”

==== Volumes ====
1. Serventy, Vincent (Editor in chief). (1982). The Wrens and Warblers of Australia. Angus & Robertson: Sydney. ISBN 0-207-14480-X
2. Serventy, Vincent (Editor in chief).. (1985). The Waterbirds of Australia. Angus & Robertson: Sydney. ISBN 0-207-15015-X
3. Lindsey, Terence R. (Writer). (1986). The Seabirds of Australia. Angus & Robertson: Sydney. ISBN 0-207-15192-X
4. Pringle, John Douglas. (Writer). (1987). The Shorebirds of Australia. Angus & Robertson: Sydney. ISBN 0-207-15348-5
5. Boles, Walter E. (Writer). (1988). The Robins and Flycatchers of Australia. Angus & Robertson: Sydney. ISBN 0-207-15400-7
6. Longmore, Wayne (Writer). (1991). Honeyeaters and their Allies of Australia. Angus & Robertson: Sydney. ISBN 0-207-15444-9
7. Crome, Francis; & Shields, James. (1992). Parrots and Pigeons of Australia. Angus & Robertson: Sydney. ISBN 0-207-15437-6
8. Olsen, Penny; Crome, Francis; & Olsen, Jerry. (1993). Birds of Prey and Ground Birds of Australia. Angus & Robertson: Sydney. ISBN 0-207-15438-4
9. Strahan, Ronald (Editor). (1994). Cuckoos, Nightbirds and Kingfishers of Australia. Angus & Robertson: Sydney. ISBN 0-207-18522-0
10. Strahan, Ronald (Editor). (1996). Finches, Bowerbirds and Other Passerines of Australia. Angus & Robertson: Sydney. ISBN 0-207-18880-7
