= Reader's Digest Complete Book of Australian Birds =

- First edition
- Author: H.J. Frith (Consultant Editor)
- Illustrator: NPIAW
- Language: English
- Subject: Australian birds
- Genre: Handbook
- Publisher: Reader's Digest Services: Sydney
- Publication date: 1976
- Publication place: Australia
- Media type: Print (hardback)
- Pages: 616
- ISBN: 0-909486-40-9
- Dewey Decimal: 598.2994

The Reader's Digest Complete Book of Australian Birds is a book first published by Reader's Digest Services Pty Ltd of Sydney, Australia in 1976 and reprinted several times, with a completely revised edition issued in 1986.

== Description ==
The book is small folio in size, 330 mm in height by 230 mm in width. It describes and illustrates bird species recorded from Australia, mostly at one species per page, using photographs sourced from the National Photographic Index of Australian Wildlife. The distinctive, mainly blue, cover features a photograph of a pair of olive-backed sunbirds.

Before the individual species accounts which fill most of the book there is a foreword by Alec H. Chisholm and sections on “Where birds live” and “Naming and identifying birds”, while following the species accounts are chapters on “Rare visitors, escaped captives and unsuccessful introductions”, “Classification by order and family”, “Behaviour that distinguishes species” by Ian Rowley, “Migrants and nomads” and “How birds' numbers are regulated” by H.J. Frith, “Birds of prehistoric Australia” by G.F. van Tets, and “The mysterious origins of Australian birds” by Richard Schodde, before the indexes and acknowledgments.

=== First edition ===
The consultant editor of the 616-page first edition was H.J. Frith. A review by Simon Bennett in the Emu, the journal of the Royal Australasian Ornithologists Union, said

”The Reader's Digest book is a co-operative effort, combining contemporary expertise in Australian ornithologywith the photographic excellence of the National Photographic Index of Australian Birds.”

”Almost every species is illustrated by one or sometimes two colour photographs. These are of high quality and no doubt represent the best published assemblage of photographs of Australian birds. The few poor quality and black-and-white photographs can be excused; the picture of the Paradise Parrot, for example, is the only one known and is of considerable historic interest. Although not all photographs were taken in the field, the techniques used convey a natural setting.”

”The text accurately summarizes much that is known of Australian birds. The list of contributors is like a Who's Who of Australian ornithology, which makes the reviewer's job difficult. The information is presented in an easily read style, free from jargon. It is good to see many ecological and conservational concepts in the text. The only major criticism relates to the information on distribution. Some of the maps are not consistent with the text (e.g. Black Butcherbird and Noisy Miners) or with published information.”

The first edition was reprinted, with minor corrections, in 1977, 1979, 1982 and 1983.

=== Second edition ===
Frith died in 1982; when a thoroughly revised and updated edition (ISBN 0949819999) was issued in 1986 the consultant editors were Richard Schodde and Sonia Tidemann. Chisholm's foreword was replaced by one by the new editors, the chapters at the back of the book were moved to the front, and new material (e.g. a chapter on “The functions of feathers”) was added. In the foreword Schodde and Tidemann say

”One of the many purposes of this book is to provide the information that will allow general appreciation of the life style and habitat needs of Australia's birds. From the moment it appeared, the Reader's Digest Complete Book of Australian Birds became the pacemaker as the most comprehensive and authoritative of popular references to the birds of our continent. Its authority stemmed – as now – from its association with the CSIRO's Division of Wildlife and Rangelands Research. Most of the first edition, published in 1976, was compiled by staff of the Division; its then Chief, Dr H. J. Frith, was consultant editor.

“The second edition seeks to maintain that standing, its input increased by members of the Division and augmented by additions from other new contributors whose help- we gratefully acknowledge.

“Because few field guides were then available, the first edition featured identification notes and the biology of our birds. Many gaps have since been filled, allowing us to stress their habits more: where they live, what they feed on and how they breed, aspects not emphasised in any other publication on Australian birds.

“The comprehensiveness of the new text springs from a careful updating of information from research on all species. Readers who skim its surface will notice at once the expanded text, the corrections in classification – though these are few – and the many changes to maps of distribution, based on the Atlas of Australian Birds just published by the Royal Australasian Ornithologists Union. Others who dig deeper will find that the accounts of most species have been revised extensively and many completely rewritten, including all additional species; not one species has been left unadjusted.”

The second edition was reprinted in 1988, 1990 and 2007.
