= Ronald Strahan =

Australian zoologist (1922–2010)

Ronald Strahan AM (1922–2010) was a zoologist, historian and author of works on the fauna of Australia.

Strahan graduated from the University of Western Australia in 1947, furthering his studies at Oxford and other universities in Hong Kong and New South Wales. He became director of Taronga Zoo in 1967 and joined the staff of the Australian Museum in 1974.

He was the editor of major publications assembled by museum, and extensively involved in oversight of the National Photographic Index of Australian Wildlife which included The Complete Book of Australian Birds and The Complete Book of Australian Mammals. Strahan also created travelling exhibitions, and wrote a series of essays on the history and work of the Australian Museum, Rare and Curious Specimens. His own publications include works on Australian fauna, and his instigated a major collection of bird song at the Australian Museum.

Strahan's second marriage was to the wildlife artist Pamela Conder.

In the 1994 Queen's Birthday Honours Strahan was made a Member of the Order of Australia for "service to zoology and to advancing understanding of Australia's natural biological heritage".

== Taxon named in his honor ==
- The hooded carpetshark Hemiscyllium strahani Whitley, 1967 is a bamboo shark in the family Hemiscylliidae found around Papua New Guinea, between latitudes 5° S and 10° S, and longitude 144° E and 153° E.
