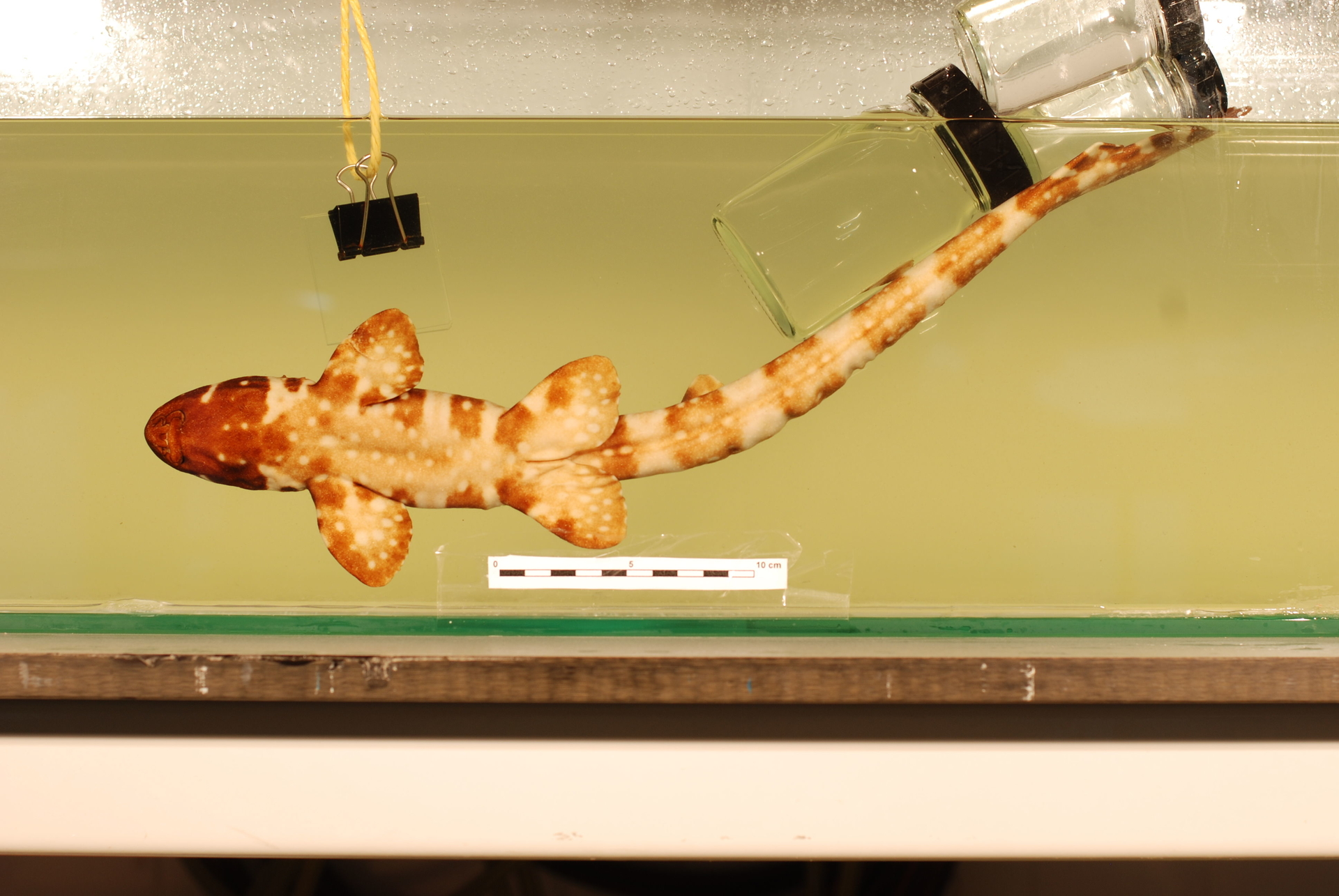

Conservation status
- Vulnerable (IUCN 3.1)

Scientific classification
- Kingdom: Animalia
- Phylum: Chordata
- Class: Chondrichthyes
- Subclass: Elasmobranchii
- Division: Selachii
- Order: Orectolobiformes
- Family: Hemiscylliidae
- Genus: Hemiscyllium
- Species: H. strahani

Binomial name
- Hemiscyllium strahani Whitley, 1967
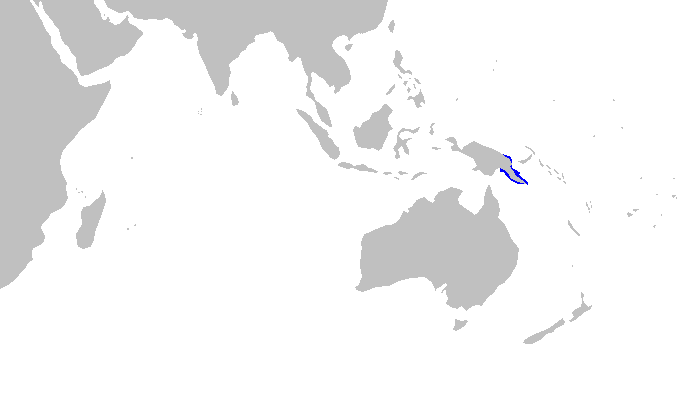
- Range of hooded carpetshark (in blue)

= Hooded carpetshark =

Species of shark

The hooded carpetshark (Hemiscyllium strahani) is a bamboo shark in the family Hemiscylliidae found around Papua New Guinea, between latitudes 5° S and 10° S, and longitude 144° E and 153° E. Its length is up to 75 cm. Like other longtailed carpetsharks, it can use its strong pectoral fins to walk on land for a short period of time. The hooded carpetshark is heavily wanted in the aquarium trade, the result is making this shark endangered.

Reproduction is oviparous.

== Etymology ==
The shark is named in honor of Australian zoologist Ronald Strahan (1922–2010), who was director of Taronga Zoological Park, where the holotype lived in captivity.

== See also ==
- List of sharks
- Carpet shark
