= Rankins Springs railway line =

Former railway line in New South Wales, Australia

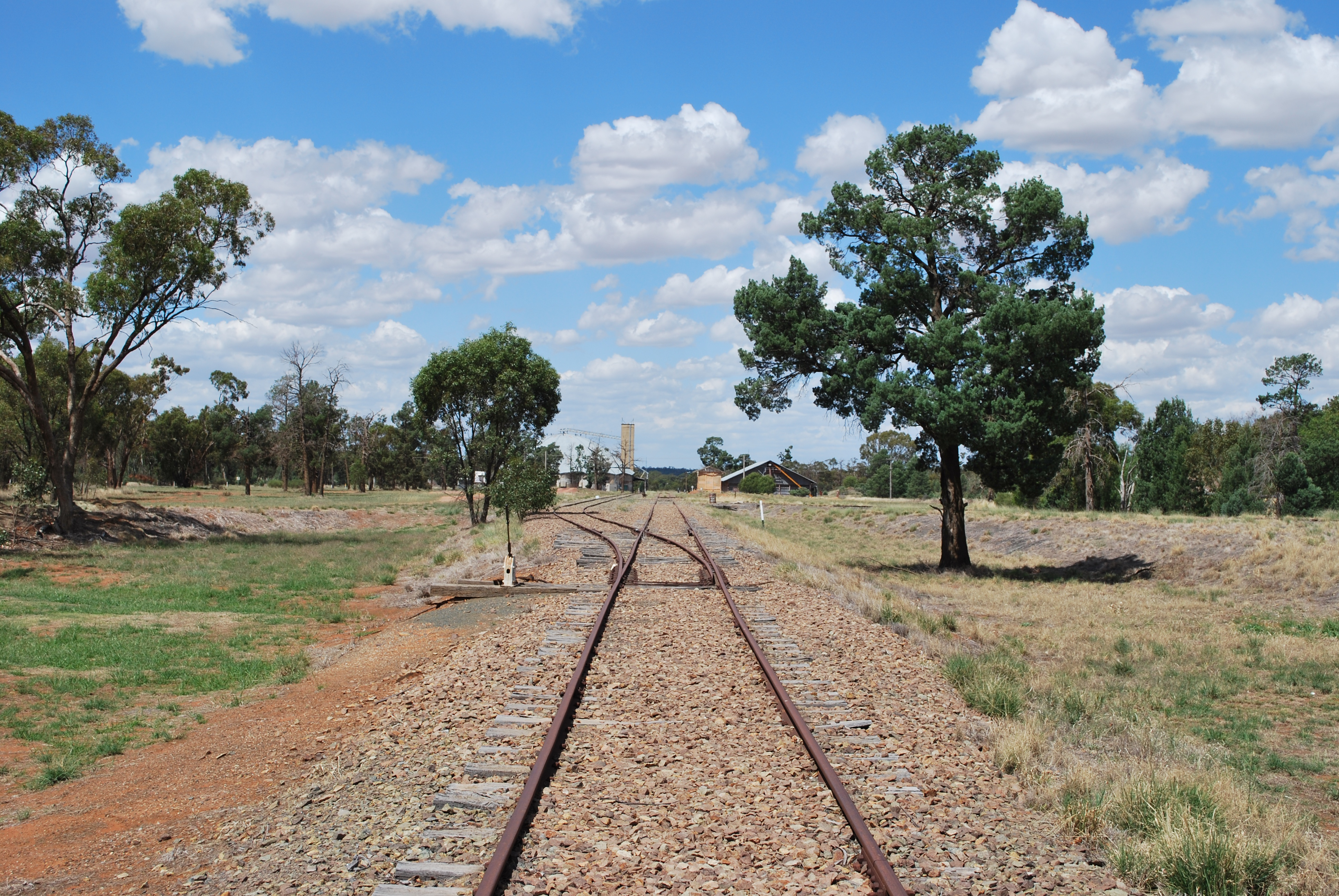
The line at Rankins Springs

The Rankins Springs railway line is a non-operational railway line in southwestern New South Wales, Australia. The line branched from the Lake Cargelligo line at the town of Barmedman, heading in a westerly direction to the town of Rankins Springs. It opened in 1923, and was constructed primarily to open up the agricultural areas in the vicinity. Passenger services were operated by CPH railmotors until the widespread withdrawal of country branchline trains in 1974. The line carried approximately 80,000 tonnes of grain per year, before being 'mothballed' in 2004. A stop block is placed on the Rankins springs line just after the junction with the Lake Cargelligo line at Barmedman

== Gallery ==
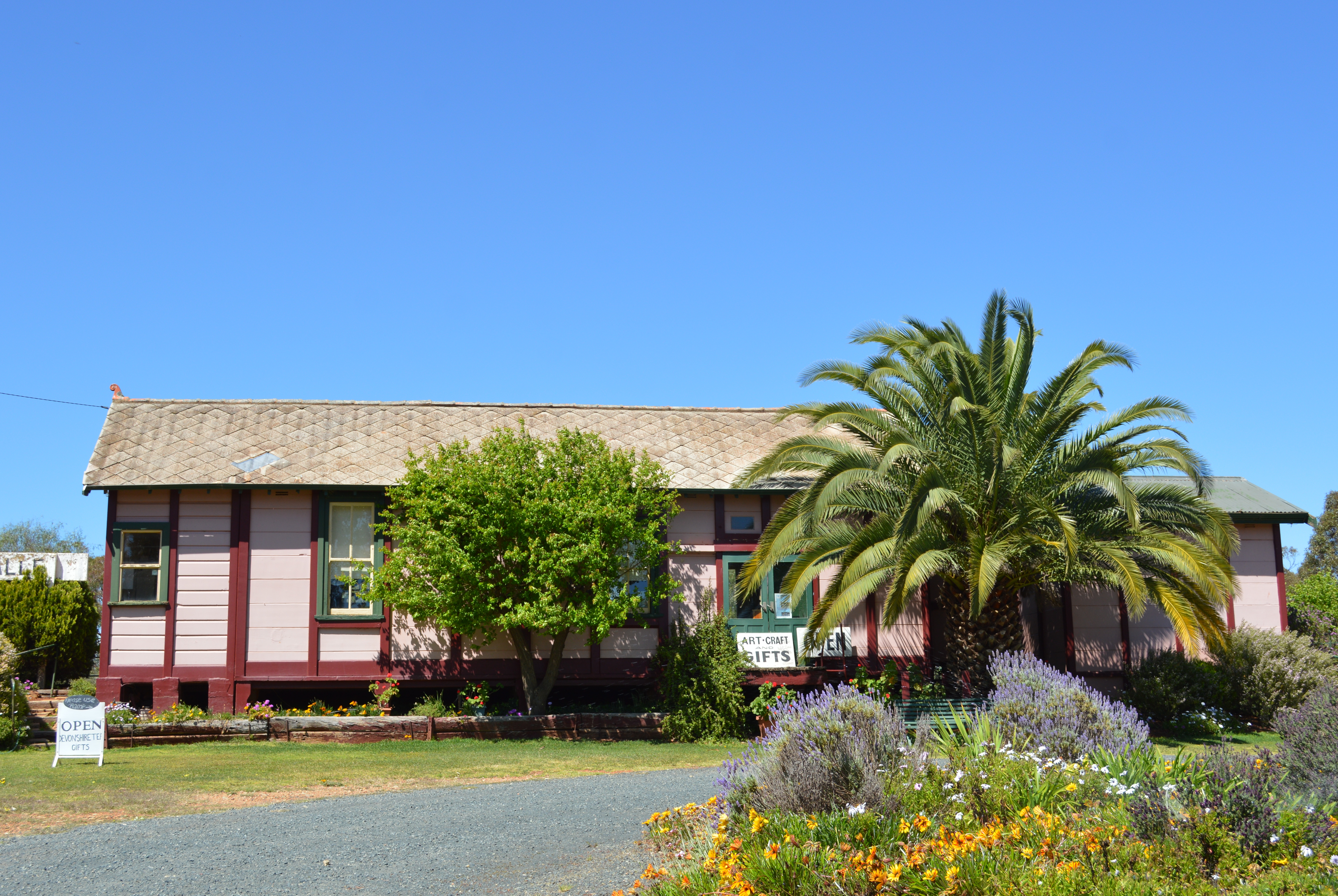

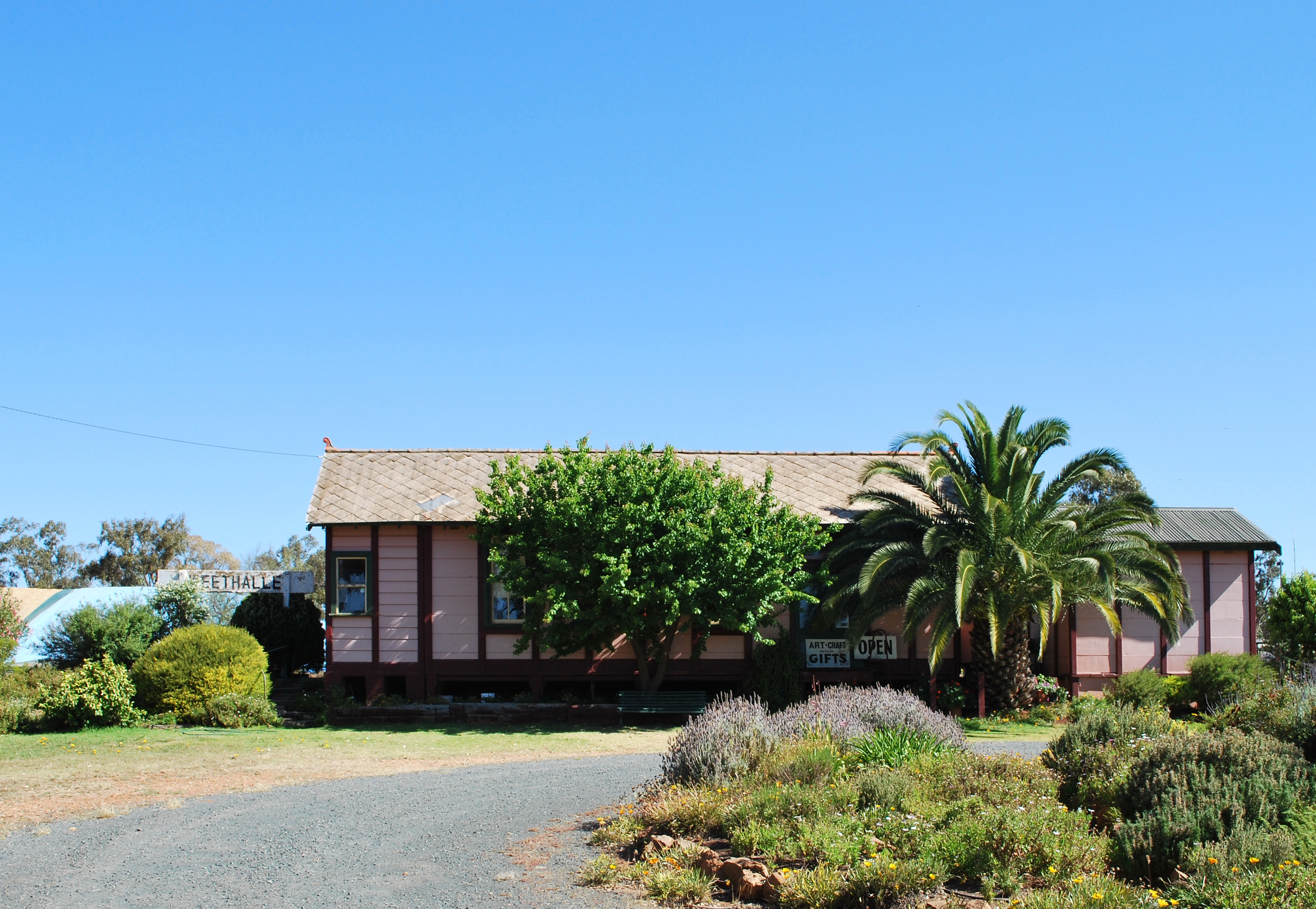

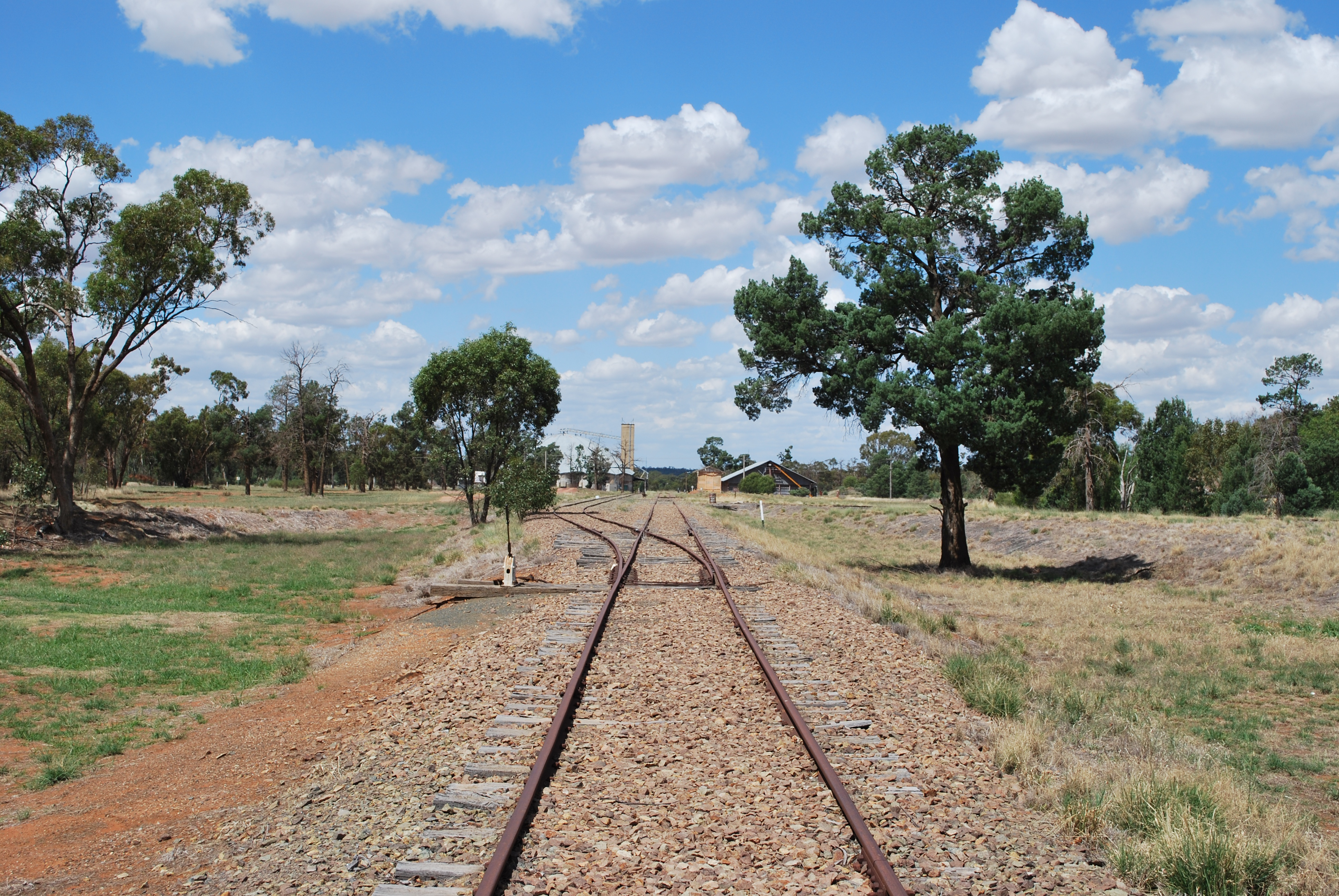

== See also ==
- Rail transport in New South Wales
