= Harold Frith =

Australian administrator and ornithologist

Harold James Frith AO (16 April 1921 – 28 June 1982) was an Australian administrator and ornithologist. He was born at Kyogle, New South Wales and studied Agricultural Science at Sydney University. Harry Frith (as he was usually known) first joined the CSIRO Division of Plant Industry but later transferred to the Division of Wildlife and carried out extensive research on malleefowl, waterfowl, especially magpie geese, and pigeons. He eventually became Chief of the Division and was instrumental in proposals that led to the establishment of Kakadu National Park.

Harry Frith was a member of the Royal Australasian Ornithologists Union (RAOU), and prominent among those pressing for reform of the organisation in the late 1960s. He was Secretary-General of the 16th International Ornithological Congress held in Canberra in 1974. Frith was elected a Fellow of the RAOU in 1974. He was an Officer of the Order of Australia.

== Early life ==
Harold James Frith was born on 16 April 1921 at Kyogle, in the north-east corner of New South Wales, the younger of two children of Richard and Elizabeth Frith. His father was a butcher later based at Lismore. Frith credited his father as a major influence on his early interest in natural history. Harry received his first rifle aged eight years and often accompanied his father to shoot pigeons for the table. On his tenth birthday he received the newly published Neville Cayley's What Bird is That?.

Harry and his brother, Alexander, were educated at Lismore High School and Scots College in Sydney. After matriculation Harry Frith studied Agricultural Science at Sydney University, completing the bachelor's degree in 1941.

== Career ==
=== War service ===
After completing his degree at Sydney University, Harry Frith enlisted in the Second Australian Imperial Force (AIF) in September 1941. He was initially sent to the Middle East with the 6th Division, but returned to Australia in March 1942 when the division was redeployed to meet the threat of Japan's entry into the war.

In September 1942, the 6th Division was deployed to New Guinea to meet the southward advance of the Japanese Army towards Port Moresby. In December, Frith was posted to the 2/1st Anti-Tank Regiment within the 6th Division. He took part in the Buna-Gona campaign when Australian and US forces sought to re-capture key Japanese beachheads on the northern coast of the Papuan Peninsula. In April 1943, Frith was promoted to sergeant.

Harry Frith returned to Australia in October 1943 and on November 20 he married Dorothy Killeen at St Philip's Anglican church in the Sydney city-centre. In September 1944 Frith was commissioned as a lieutenant and appointed as an inspector of food supplies at Land Headquarters in Melbourne.Harry Frith was discharged from the AIF in October 1945.

=== Move to Griffith ===
Harry and Dorothy Frith relocated to Griffith in the Riverina district of NSW after Harry gained a position as assistant works manager and technologist at the Griffith Cannery. By May 1946, however, Frith had joined the Griffith Research Station run by the Council for Scientific and Industrial Research (CSIR, later to become CSIRO) under Eric West. Griffith was in the heart of the Murrumbidgee Irrigation Area and the CSIR research station had been established there in 1926 to carry out horticultural research and provide advice and assistance to the irrigation industry. As an assistant research officer Frith was engaged in experiments with horizontal wind fans to protect orchards against frost. His job included outreach to community and industry groups reporting on the results of his research, which were the subject of a number of his early publications.

In 1951, the officer-in-charge of the CSIRO Wildlife Survey section enlisted Harry Frith to assist with monitoring the spread of the newly released myxoma virus among rabbit populations. Frith had found himself increasingly drawn to the diverse wildlife of the district and took this opportunity to make wildlife biology the focus of his research. In July 1952 he formally transferred to the Wildlife Survey section.

=== Malleefowl research ===
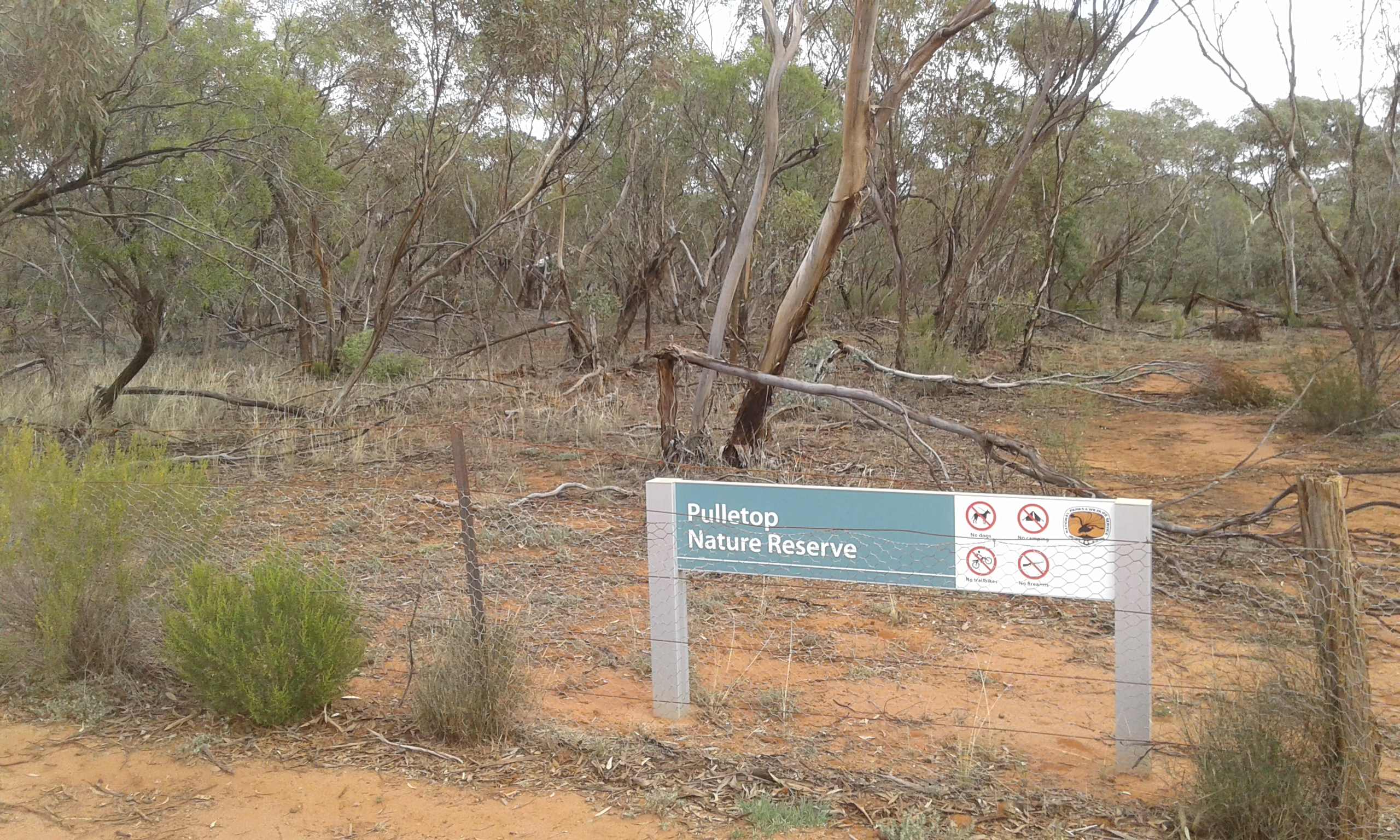
Pulletop Nature Reserve near Rankins Springs, the location where Harry Frith carried out his malleefowl research.

From 1951, working when he could in his own time separate from work, Harry Frith began to study the ecology and behaviour of the malleefowl. He had located a small number of breeding birds in remnant mallee woodland on a farm 38 km north of Griffith (22 km south-west of Rankins Springs). Frith documented the behaviour of the birds and the roles played by each sex. He made observations and conducted experiments on the mounds of soil and fallen vegetation that the malleefowl used to incubate their eggs, with the male bird constantly monitoring the temperature and making adjustments to the mound.

Frith's 'unofficial' work on the malleefowl was published in nine scientific papers published between 1955 and 1962. His malleefowl research was "one of the first Australian ecological studies in which rigorous experiments were conducted in the field to test hypotheses". In 1962 Frith published his findings in a book intended for the general public, The Mallee-Fowl: The Bird that Builds an Incubator (1962), "which set the style for a new genre of books on Australian wildlife that combined scientific findings with a writing style that appealed to a wide public".

In 1963, the area of remnant mallee woodland in which Harry Frith studied the malleefowl was dedicated as a reserve comprising 145 hectares. Isolated and surrounded by cleared farmland, Pulletop Nature Reserve is nowadays a refuge of natural habitat for many native species within the region. A total of 123 mallee and woodland birds have been recorded within the reserve, although there have been significant declines of some species attributed to the small size of the reserve, its isolation within mostly cleared land and predation by cats and foxes. The reserve's emblematic species, the malleefowl, was last observed there in the 1980s and "is now considered to be locally extinct".

=== Waterfowl research ===
After transferring to the Wildlife Survey section of the CSIRO, Frith undertook a major study into the ecology of waterfowl, specifically addressing the widespread perception that ducks were causing widespread damage to rice-crops. From 1951 to 1957 he carried out the first scientific survey of waterfowl in Australia, making extensive observations along the inland waterways of the Murray-Darling system. The period of Frith's study coincided with flood years interspersed with dry years and his data revealed that breeding in ducks was triggered by rising water levels.

In 1955, the Northern Territory administration requested the CSIRO Wildlife Survey section to investigate the impact of magpie geese on agriculture in northern Australia. The officer-in-charge, Francis Ratcliffe, asked Frith to undertake the task. Working with Stephen Davies the researchers found that magpie geese depended on moderately deep water for feeding and breeding habitats, and concluded that the geese "would not be a continuing problem to the rice industry; rather the advance of settlement would eliminate the magpie goose from the Northern Territory".

Frith maintained an interest in the development of conservation reserves in northern Australia and was involved as an advisor in the process of making the Woolwonga Aboriginal Reserve a nature reserve in 1962, an area that included the Bamaroo-gjaja (or ‘goose camp’) on the South Alligator River where Frith and Davies had worked. This began a process of natural environment protection in the Northern Territory that ultimately led to the declaration in 1979 of the Kakadu National Park (an area which incorporates the Woolwonga Aboriginal Reserve).

=== Move to Canberra ===
In 1956, Frith moved with his family to Canberra as a Principal Research Officer in the CSIRO Wildlife Survey section. In 1960 he led a major research effort on the ecology of the red kangaroo and their impact on the sheep industry. Frith was in charge of the Australian Bird-Banding Scheme (within the CSIRO Wildlife Survey section) from 1960 to 1962. After Francis Radcliffe's resignation and a subsequent competitive selection process, Frith was appointed in May 1961 as officer-in-charge of the Wildlife Survey section. In 1962 the Wildlife Survey section became the Division of Wildlife Research within the CSIRO, with Frith as its chief.

Frith used his position as Chief of the CSIRO Division of Wildlife Research to foster wildlife conservation by the Australian States and Territories. In 1961 he became a member of the New South Wales Fauna Protection Panel (and its successor the NSW National Parks and Wildlife Advisory Council) and from 1963 he joined the Northern Territory Wildlife Advisory Council.

In 1963, Frith was awarded a Doctorate in Agricultural Science from Sydney University for his work on the malleefowl and Australian waterfowl. His waterfowl research led to the publication in 1967 of his groundbreaking book Waterfowl in Australia.

From 1976, the CSIRO was put under increasing financial constraints by the Fraser government, including a change in management structure that diminished the power of Division Chiefs. During this period of "leading a Division with diminishing resources" Frith was subject to severe stress. In 1980 Frith was appointed Officer of the Order of Australia (AO) for his "services to the understanding and conservation of Australian wildlife". He had been nominated for the honour by the NSW National Parks and Wildlife Service.

Early in 1980, Frith announced that he would retire as Chief when he reached the age of sixty in April 1981. This decision led to an internal review of the Division held in October 1980, an event which he found very stressful. The day after the review concluded, Frith suffered a heart attack. He went on medical leave and retired the following year.

Frith left Canberra in January 1982 to take up residence with his family on a small rural holding at Goonellabah, near Lismore. He had plans in his retirement to restore the rainforest vegetation on the farm and pursue studies on the birds of the region, but he suffered a second heart attack and died on 28 June 1982.

== Legacy ==
Frith's life and work encompassed a period of change. When Frith began working for the CSIRO the value of native fauna and flora was seen in economic terms, to be eliminated if perceived or determined to be detrimental to economic activity. Throughout the 1960s and 1970s that mindset changed, evolving towards a recognition that the natural environment had its own intrinsic worth, that native animals and plants are “a priceless heritage to be protected and cherished”. Throughout his career as a biologist Harry Frith played a role in bringing about that perceptual change in Australian society. His influence was widespread, through his researches into the behaviour and ecology of a range of native birds and also kangaroos and the books intended for general readership that he wrote and edited. His leadership of wildlife research within the CSIRO was also significant, as well as the important influence he had on government conservation policy at both State and Federal levels.

== Publications ==
Frith was the author of more than 100 scientific papers, as well as numerous technical reports and popular articles. He was the author or editor of 14 books on wildlife and conservation, including the following:

- Frith, H. J. (1959), Breeding of the mallee fowl, Leipoa ocellata Gould (Megapodiidae), C.S.I.R.O. Wildlife Research: Canberra.Reprinted from the C.S.I.R.O. Wildlife Research, Vol.4, no.1, pp. 31–60, 1959.
- Frith, H. J. (1962), The Mallee-Fowl: The Bird that Builds an Incubator, Angus & Robertson: Sydney.
- Frith, H. J., & Newsome, A. E. (1966), The Kangaroo and the Game Meat Trade, Wildlife Conservation School, University of Adelaide: Adelaide ("Paper given at Wildlife Conservation School, University of Adelaide, July, 1966").
- Frith, H. J. (c. 1967), Waterfowl in Australia, Angus & Robertson: Sydney.
- Frith, H. J., & Calaby, J. H. (1969), Kangaroos, Cheshire: Melbourne.
- Frith, H. J., & Costin, A. B. (eds.) (1971), Conservation, Penguin Books: Harmondsworth, Middlesex, UK.
- Frith, H. J. (1973), Wildlife Conservation, Angus & Robertson: Sydney.
- Frith, H. J., & Sawer, G. (eds.) (1974), The Murray Waters: Man, Nature and a River System, Proceedings of a Symposium, Angus & Robertson: Cremorne, NSW.
- Frith, H. J. (ed.) (1976), Birds in the Australian High Country, Reed: Sydney.
- Frith, H. J. (consultant ed.) (c. 1976), Reader's Digest Complete Book of Australian Birds, Reader's Digest Services: Surry Hills, NSW.
- Frith, H. J., & Calaby, J. H. (eds.) (1976), Proceedings of the 16th International Ornithological Congress, Canberra, Australia, 12–17 August 1974, Australian Academy of Science: Canberra.
- Frith, H. J. (1982), Pigeons and Doves of Australia, Rigby: Adelaide.
