= Donald Trounson =

British diplomat and photographer

Alfred Donald Trounson OAM (30 September 1905 – 29 January 2009) was a British diplomat and amateur photographer who settled in Australia in his retirement to become a bird photographer and the founder of the National Photographic Index of Australian Wildlife.

== Early years ==
Trounson was born in Redruth, Cornwall, the son of a provisions merchant. He was educated at Mill Hill School in north London, where he displayed an early interest in photography when he won the Public Schools Photographic Competition with a landscape of St Ives harbour.

On leaving school Trounson worked for several years in the hardware department of the family business, following which he became a management trainee with Marks and Spencer. He played the piano in musical festivals and was a member of the Cornwall Light Orchestra. In 1929 he competed in the Monte Carlo Rally with rally driver and automotive designer Donald Healey. A brief first marriage failed.

== War service ==
Trounson was commissioned into the Royal Army Service Corps (RASC) as a second lieutenant on 2 December 1939, shortly after the outbreak of the Second World War. With the RASC he was in charge of activities as various as distributing chocolate to soldiers returning from Dunkirk, escorting captured Italian soldiers to prison camps in Algeria and organising food supplies in Sicily. He was posted to Naples where he met his second wife, Peggy Dow, a singer who was Harold Macmillan's archivist. When the war ended he was a Lieutenant-Colonel with the Allied Control Commission in Rome.

== The diplomat ==
From the Allied Commission he transferred to the economic advisory department of the British Embassy in Rome as a First Secretary. After seven years there he returned to Britain to work in the news department of the Foreign Office while settling in the village of Blackham in Sussex. His career then continued with postings, first to the United Nations in New York and then to Canberra, Australia, in 1957.

== Australia ==
When Trounson went to Australia he began to record bird songs there, accumulating a collection of recordings, as well as reviving his interest in photography. After three years, during his mid-tour leave, he travelled with Peggy through Queensland recording and photographing birds, producing pictures of 110 species. Following his retirement, he stayed in Australia, continuing his interest in bird photography. His success resulted in further expeditions, to the Cape York Peninsula, Iron Range, and the Simpson Desert where he photographed the Eyrean grasswren, unseen since the 19th century and thought to be possibly extinct. After Peggy died he married Molly Clampett, with whom he authored several pictorial books and field guides on Australian birds.

=== National Photographic Index of Australian Wildlife ===
In 1969, Trounson became the instigator of the National Photographic Index of Australian Birds, later expanded to include mammals, reptiles and amphibians and renamed the National Photographic Index of Australian Wildlife, a project based at the Australian Museum in Sydney, in association with the National Library of Australia in Canberra. He served as the project's chief executive officer until 1981.

On 26 January 2003, Trounson was awarded the Medal of the Order of Australia (OAM) "for service to the community as creator of the National Photographic Index of Australian Birds".

Trounson was widowed twice, outliving both Peggy and Molly. He died at the age of 103.

== Publications ==
- 1969 – 60 Camera Studies of Australian Birds. (With Molly Clampett, and with notes by Peggy Trounson). Australian Consolidated Press Ltd: Sydney.
- 1987 – Australia Land of Birds. (With Molly Trounson). Collins: Sydney. ISBN 0-00-217314-X
- 1989 – Australian Birds: An Index of 864 Photographs Simply Classified for Easy Identification. (With Molly Trounson). PR Books, Australia. ISBN 1-86436-241-3 (the second edition of Australia Land of Birds)
- 2002- Australian Birds: A Concise Photographic Field Guide. (With Molly Trounson) . Cameron House, An Imprint of Bookwise International Pty Ltd, Wingfield, South Australia. ((ISBN 1 875999-47-7))
- 2005 – Australian birds: a concise photographic field guide. (With Molly Trounson). Bluestone Press, Wingfield. ISBN 0-9752428-4-9
