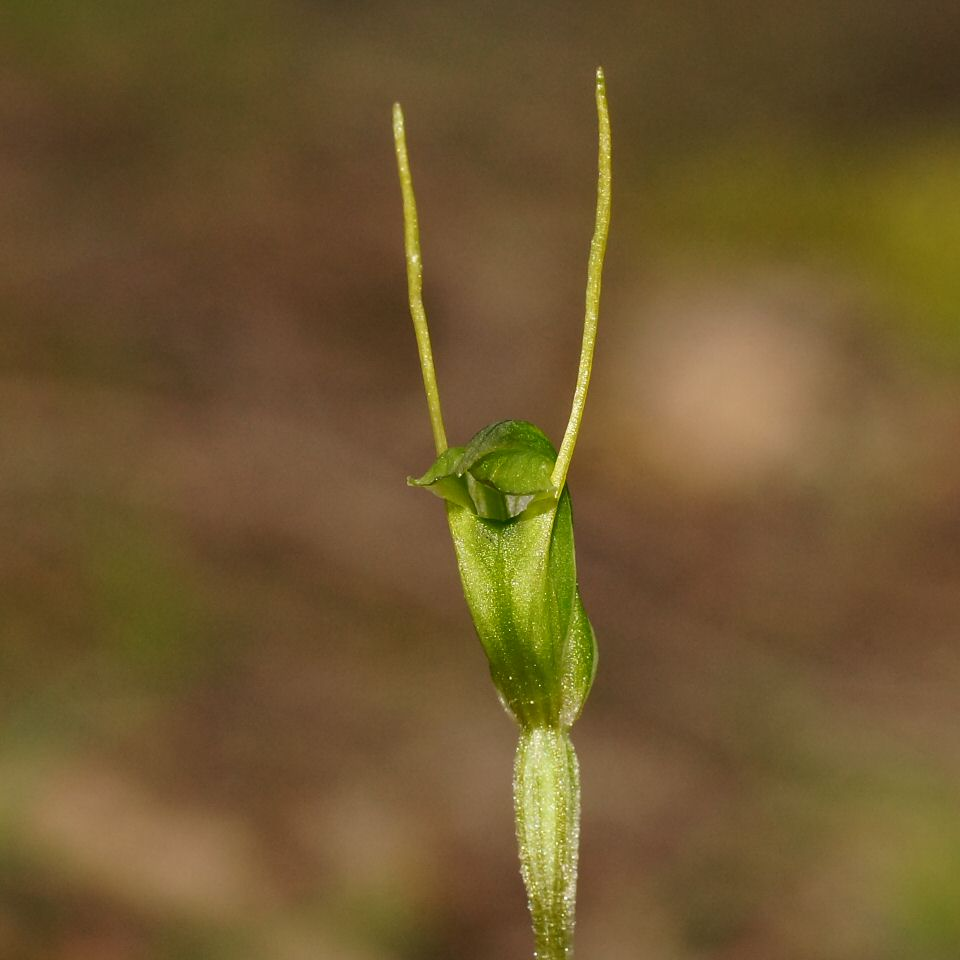
- Pterostylis nana growing in the Dandenong Ranges

Scientific classification
- Kingdom: Plantae
- Clade: Tracheophytes
- Clade: Angiosperms
- Clade: Monocots
- Order: Asparagales
- Family: Orchidaceae
- Subfamily: Orchidoideae
- Tribe: Cranichideae
- Genus: Pterostylis
- Species: P. nana

Binomial name
- Pterostylis nana R.Br.

Synonyms
- Linguella nana (R.Br.) D.L.Jones) D.L.Jones & M.A.Clem.; Diplodium nanum (R.Br.) D.L.Jones) D.L.Jones & M.A.Clem.

= Pterostylis nana =

Dwarf snail orchid

Species of orchid

Pterostylis nana, commonly known as the dwarf snail orchid, is a species of orchid endemic to Australia. It has a rosette of leaves at it base and a single narrow, bright green and white flower with a small labellum. There is uncertainty about its classification - some sources include South Australia and Western Australia in its range.

== Description ==
Pterostylis nana is a terrestrial, perennial, deciduous, herb with an underground tuber and a rosette of egg-shaped to heart-shaped leaves, each leaf 5–20 mm long and 3–10 mm wide. A single bright green and white flower, 10–15 mm long and 4–5 mm wide is borne on a stalk 50–150 mm high. The dorsal sepal is erect, more or less flat on top and fused to the petals forming a hood or "galea" over the column. The lateral sepals are erect, in close contact with the galea and taper to a thread-like tip about 20 mm long. The sinus between the lateral sepals is more or less flat and has a dark green central area. The labellum is 3–5 mm long, about 2 mm wide, straight, blunt and hidden inside the flower. Flowering occurs from July to October.

The State Herbarium of South Australia lists this species as being present in that state and in Western Australia. The Royal Botanic Garden Melbourne reports that the taxonomy of the species is "under investigation".

== Taxonomy and naming ==
Pterostylis nana was first formally described in 1810 by Robert Brown in his Prodromus Florae Novae Hollandiae et Insulae Van Diemen. The specific epithet (nana) means 'dwarf'.

== Distribution and habitat ==
The dwarf snail orchid grows in a range of habitats from coastal heath to forest, mostly in sheltered sites. It occurs in New South Wales south from Taree and is widespread in Victoria and Tasmania
