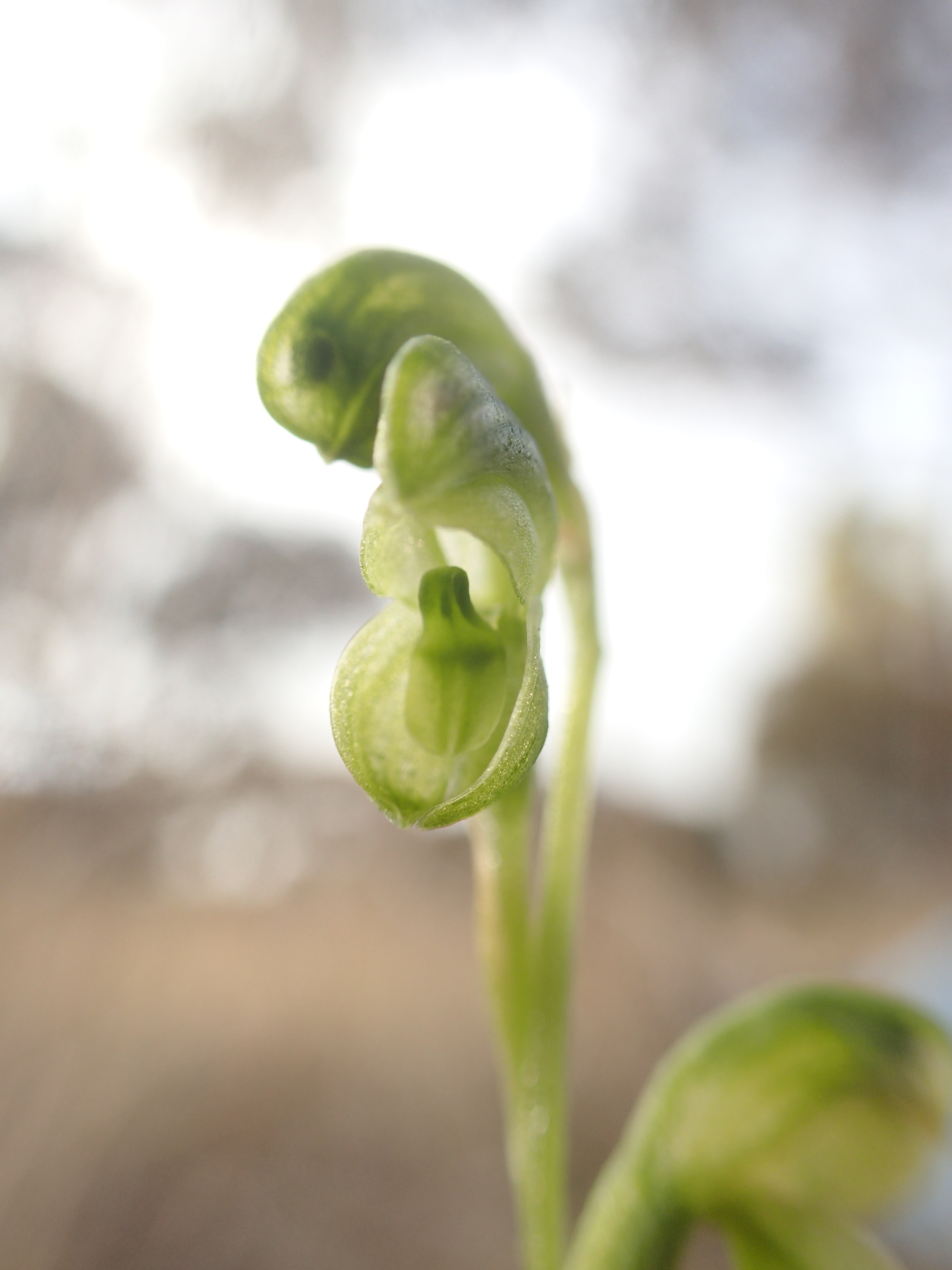
- Pterostylis mutica growing near Lake King, Western Australia

Scientific classification
- Kingdom: Plantae
- Clade: Tracheophytes
- Clade: Angiosperms
- Clade: Monocots
- Order: Asparagales
- Family: Orchidaceae
- Subfamily: Orchidoideae
- Tribe: Cranichideae
- Genus: Pterostylis
- Species: P. mutica

Binomial name
- Pterostylis mutica R.Br.

Synonyms
- Oligochaetochilus muticus (R.Br.) Szlach.; Hymenochilus muticus (R.Br.) D.L.Jones & M.A.Clem.

= Pterostylis mutica =

Midget greenhood

Species of orchid

Pterostylis mutica, commonly known as the midget greenhood, is a plant in the orchid family Orchidaceae and is endemic to Australia, occurring in all states but not the Northern Territory. There is a rosette of leaves at the base of the flowering stem and up to fifteen pale green flowers which have a sensitive labellum.

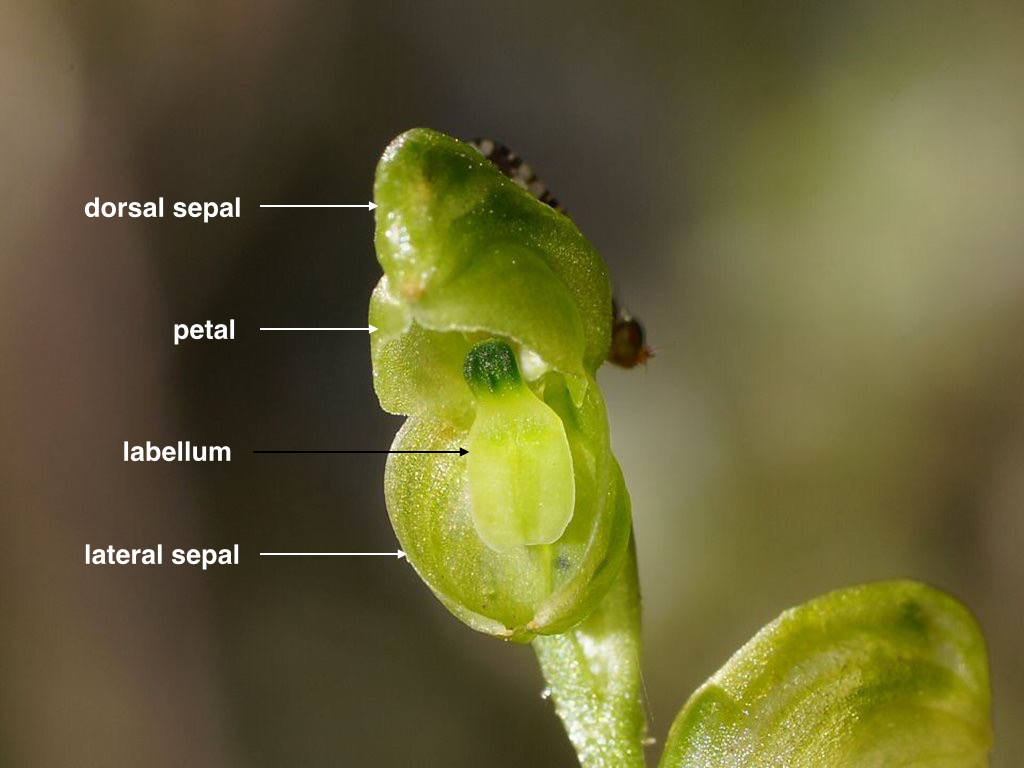
Labelled image of P. mutica

== Description ==
Pterostylis mutica, is a terrestrial, perennial, deciduous, herb with an underground tuber. There is a rosette of between six and twelve, egg-shaped leaves, each leaf 10–30 mm (0.4–1 in) long and 5–15 mm (0.2–0.6 in) wide at the base of the plant. Between two and twenty well-spaced flowers are borne on a flowering spike 150–350 mm (6–10 in) high with five to ten stem leaves wrapped around it. The flowers are pale green, 8–10 mm (0.3–0.4 in) long and about 5 mm (0.2 in) wide. The dorsal sepal and petals are joined to form a hood called the "galea" over the column. The galea is curved with a pointed tip turning downwards. The lateral sepals turn downwards and are about 7 mm (0.3 in) long, 8 mm (0.3 in) wide, cupped and joined for most of their length. The labellum is about 4 mm (0.2 in) long, about 2 mm (0.08 in) wide and whitish-green with a dark green appendage. Flowering occurs from July to December.

== Taxonomy and naming ==
Pterostylis mutica was first formally described in 1810 by Robert Brown from a specimen collected near Port Jackson and the description was published in Prodromus Florae Novae Hollandiae et Insulae Van Diemen. The specific epithet (mutica) is a Latin word meaning "shortened" or "docked" referring to the blunt petals and sepals.

== Distribution and habitat ==
Pterostylis mutica is widespread and often common, growing in a wide range of habitats from near the coast to mountains, but usually in well-drained soil. It tolerates dry conditions, poor soil and exposed positions. It is widespread in New South Wales and Victoria and also occurs in south-east Queensland, south-eastern South Australia and the south-west of Western Australia. There is doubt about its presence in Tasmania

== Ecology ==
The labellum of P. mutica is attractive to a species of gnat which lands on the labellum and grasps the dark green appendage. When it does so, the labellum springs upward, trapping the insect inside the now-closed flower. The gnat can now only escape by pushing between "wings" on the sides of the column. As it does so, it either removes a pollinium or deposits one from a previously visited flower of the same species, and pollination occurs.
