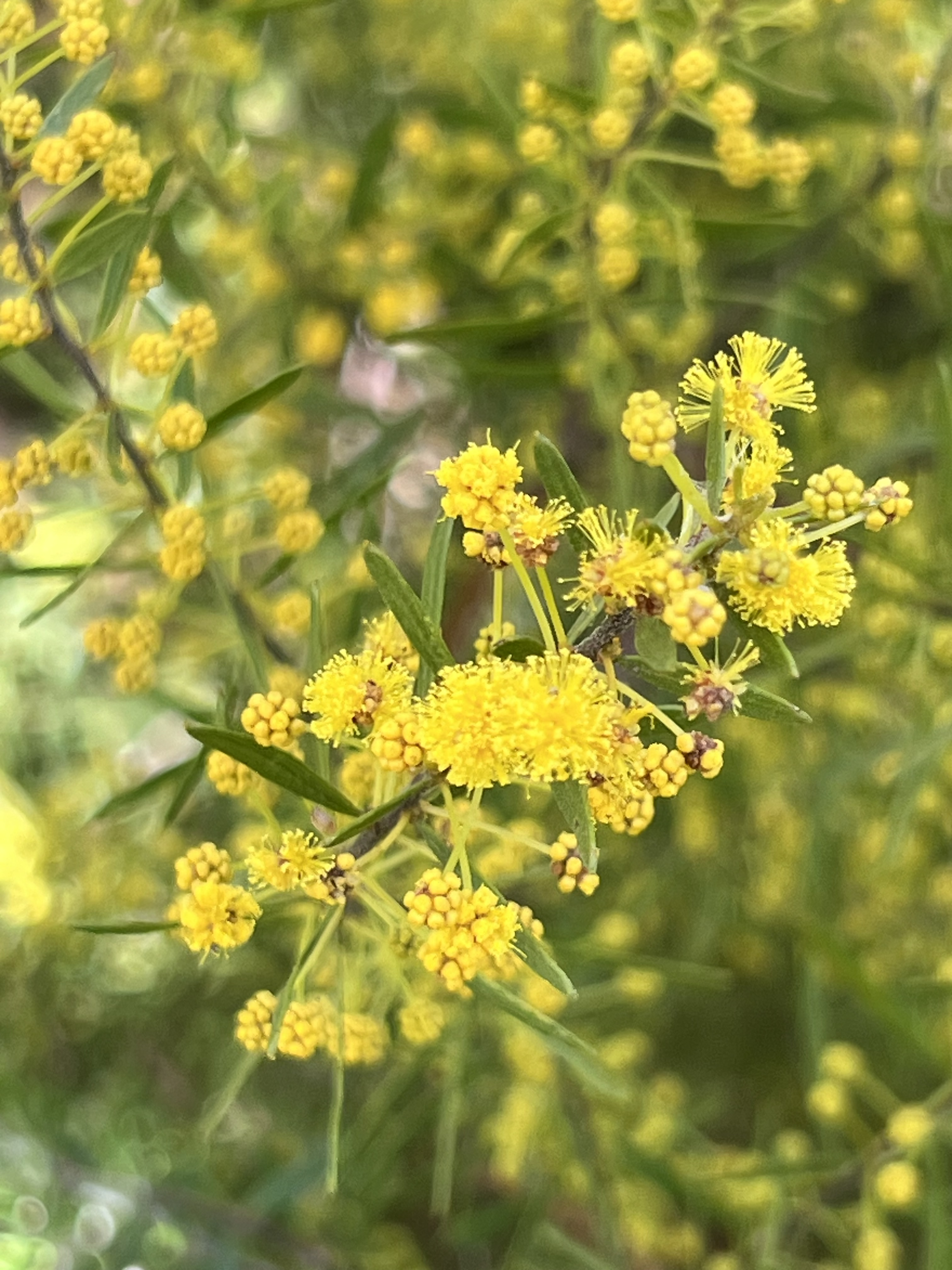

Scientific classification
- Kingdom: Plantae
- Clade: Tracheophytes
- Clade: Angiosperms
- Clade: Eudicots
- Clade: Rosids
- Order: Fabales
- Family: Fabaceae
- Subfamily: Caesalpinioideae
- Clade: Mimosoid clade
- Genus: Acacia
- Species: A. lineata

Binomial name
- Acacia lineata A.Cunn. ex G.Don
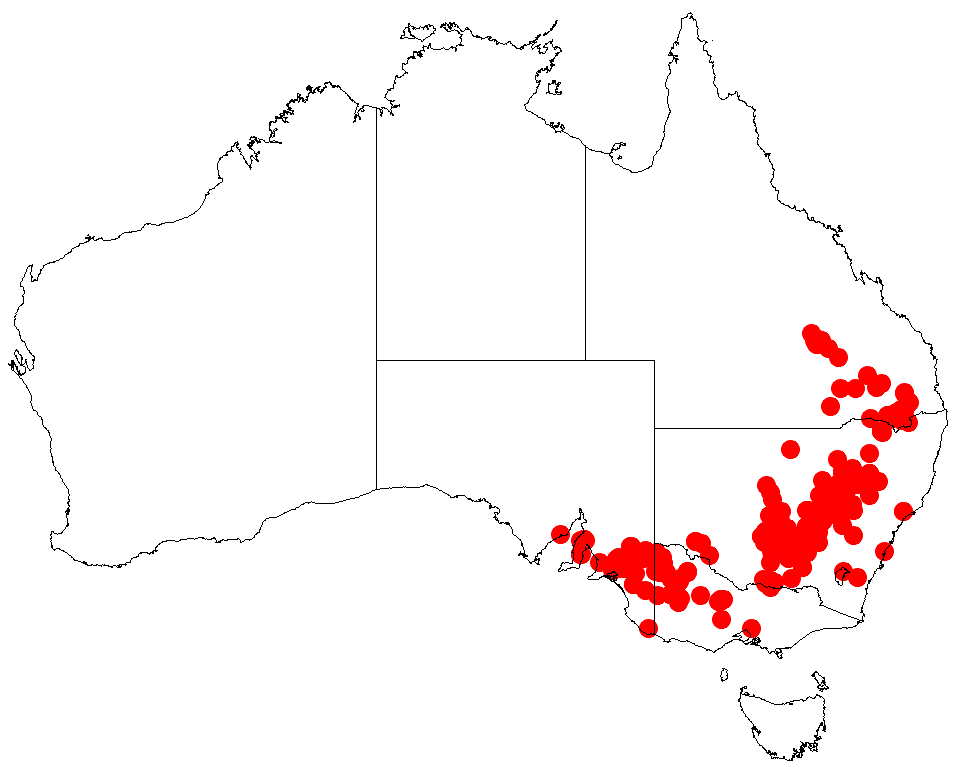
- Occurrence data from AVH

Synonyms
- Acacia dasyphylla Benth.; Acacia runciformis A.Cunn. ex G.Don; Racosperma lineatum (A.Cunn. ex G.Don) Pedley

= Acacia lineata =

Species of legume

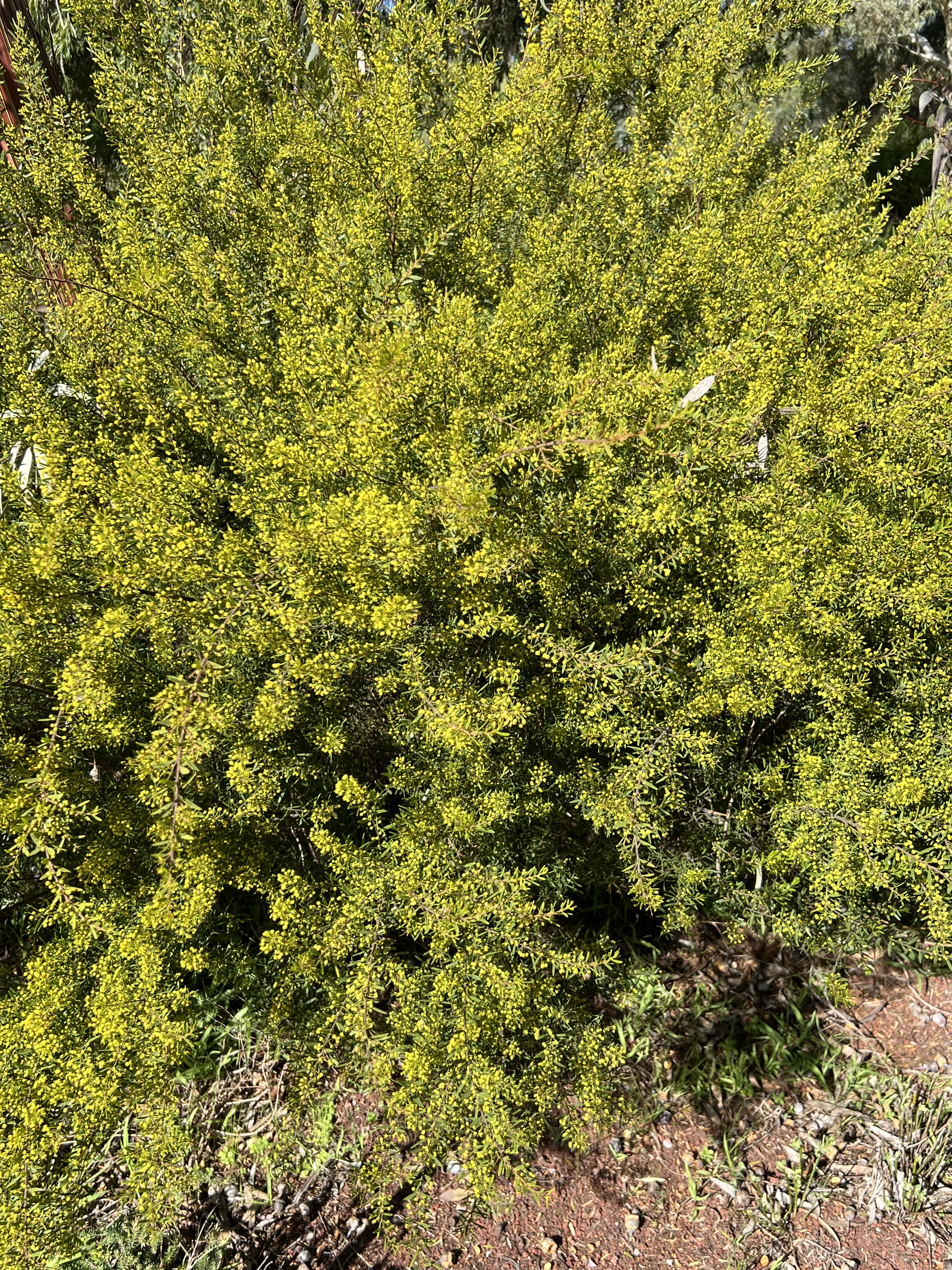
Habit

Acacia lineata commonly known as streaked wattle or narrow lined-leaved wattle, is a species of flowering plant in the family Fabaceae and is endemic to south-eastern continental Australia. It is an erect or bushy, spreading shrub with crowded, more or less linear phyllodes, spherical heads of bright golden yellow flowers, and curved to wavy or twisted, firmly papery to thinly leathery, glabrous sticky pods.

== Description ==
Acacia lineata is a bushy, spreading shrub typically 0.5–2 m (1 ft 8 in – 6 ft 7 in) high and 1–2.5 m (3 ft 3 in – 8 ft 2 in) wide and has more or less terete, often sticky branchlets covered with soft hairs. Its phyllodes are somewhat crowded, ascending to erect, normally more or less narrowly oblong, 7–20 mm (0.28–0.79 in) long, 1–2.5 mm (0.039–0.098 in) wide with an oblique point on the end or sometimes almost hooked.

The flowers are borne in one or two spherical heads in axils on slender, normally glabrous peduncles 5–12 mm (0.20–0.47 in) long, each head with 10 to 18 bright golden yellow flowers. Flowering occurs from July to October, and the pods are curved to wavy or twisted, firmly papery to thinly leathery, up to 50 mm (2.0 in) long, 2–4 mm (0.079–0.157 in) wide, glabrous and sticky. The seeds are oblong, 3–5 mm (0.12–0.20 in) long, slightly shiny brown with an aril on the end.

== Taxonomy ==
Acacia lineata was first formally described in 1832 by George Don in his book, A General History of Dichlamydeous Plants, from an unpublished description by Allan Cunningham.

== Distribution and habitat ==
Streaked wattle has a scattered distribution from the Eyre Peninsula and Cowell in South Australia, through north-western Victoria and New South Wales to near the Carnarvon Range in Central Queensland. It grows in a variety of habitats such as sclerophyll forest and woodland, but mostly occurs in mallee communities.

== Ecology ==
Acacia lineata can grow in alkaline, sandy, or gravely soils.

Having phyllodes instead of leaves help A. lineate to survive in dry semi-arid environments, by reducing water loss. The phyllodes of A. lineatea are small, point up and are slightly hairy; adaptations that further reduce water loss.

Acacias are able to fix nitrogen in the soil via a host bacteria that live on the roots called rhizobia, which aids in the growth of other plant species.

== Reproduction and dispersal ==
A. lineata flowers appear from July to October depending on the region, with seeds maturing over summer.

The pale aril of the A. lineata seeds, suggests dispersal by ants.

== Use in horticulture ==
Acacia lineata is planted as an ornamental shrub in parks and along roadsides. It prefers temperate regions, is moderately drought and frost tolerant, and will grow from a seed or cutting. Acacias are a good source of pollen; sheltered nesting habitat for birds and seeds which are eaten by birds.
