= Rankins Springs =

- Suburb
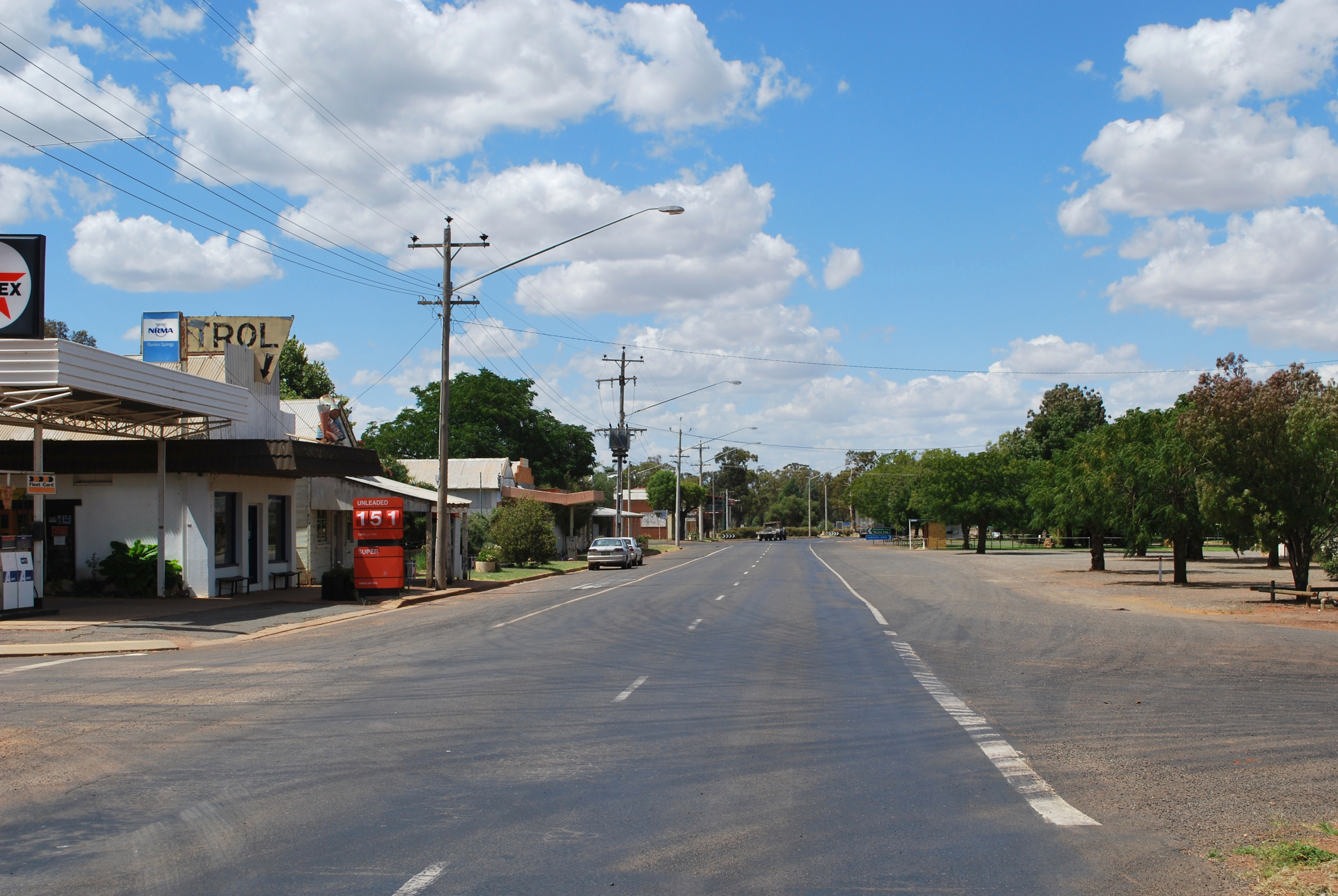
- Mid-Western Highway passing through Rankins Springs

- Coordinates: 33°50′0″S 146°15′0″E
- Country: Australia
- State: New South Wales
- LGA: Carrathool Shire
- Location: 559 km (347 mi) W of Sydney; 65 km (40 mi) N of Griffith; 91 km (57 mi) W of West Wyalong

Government
  - State electorate: Murray
  - Federal divisions: Farrer; Parkes
- Elevation: 221 m (725 ft)

Population
  - Total: 208 (2021 census)
- Postcode: 2669
- County: Cooper

Rankins Springs is a village in the Riverina region of New South Wales, Australia in Carrathool Shire and on the Mid-Western Highway. At the 2011 census, Rankins Springs had a population of 299 residents living in 145 private dwellings. This dropped to 174 in 2016, but rebounded to 208 in 2021. The settlement is strung out along the Mid-Western Highway and adjacent railway line. The main agricultural activities of the district around Rankins Springs are the growing of crops such as wheat and oats, and beef-cattle.

== History ==
The history of Rankins Springs is a story of two settlements 10 kilometres (6 miles) apart. The earlier locality was situated near a water source at the junction of several roads and operated essentially as a hotel, store and post-office, with adjoining paddocks on freehold land. The later village of Rankins Springs developed around the terminus of a railway branch line completed in 1923.

=== The original settlement ===
The site of the original township is 10 km (6 mi) north-east of its current location, off the Rankins Springs Road near a narrow gap in the Conapaira Range. The name of the locality probably refers to Arthur Ranken, a pastoralist with extensive holdings in New South Wales, including the “Cunimbla” run south of the Lachlan River (in the vicinity of present-day Forbes) which he had occupied by the late 1840s. or the Rankin Brothers that owned the nearby Ballandry Station. In common with other Riverina pastoralists, Ranken supplied stock to the Victorian market (a trade that escalated from the mid-1850s as the population increased in the wake of the Victorian gold-rushes). The “Rankin’s Springs” location probably got its name as a place where water could be reliably found on a stock-route across the dry country between the Lachlan and Murrumbidgee rivers. The location of the springs at the foot of the Conapaira Range is nearby to a break in the hills, an ideal place for stock and vehicles to cross the rocky range.

Permanent settlement at the Rankin's Springs locality was established in 1869.This was a period of increased population and consolidation of Riverina townships as the New South Wales government sought to encourage closer settlement in the inland regions. By the late 1860s the large pastoral runs held by leasehold were beginning to be broken up under legislation that allowed “free selection before survey” of crown land. The location of Rankin's Springs at the convergence of district roads and its proximity to a supply of water, provided an opportunity to provide amenities to the travelling public and residents of the district.

In the early 1870s a hotel was constructed at Rankin's Springs. The hotel stood on freehold land comprising 104 acres, excised from the “Naradhan” pastoral run, that was sold in several lots in about 1871 and May 1872.In April 1872 a publican's licence was issued to John Dwyer for the Rankins Springs Hotel. In November 1873 the licence was transferred to William Blood, who held it only briefly. In July 1874 the publican's licence was transferred to James Graham who held the licence during the next fourteen years until June 1888 (apart from a period from March 1881 to October 1882 when the licence was transferred to Graham's brother-in-law John King).

A post-office was established at Rankins Springs on 1 September 1875 with James Graham as postmaster.Weekly mail services were established linking Rankins Springs post-office with Narrandera (via Barellan) and with Wollongough (modern Ungarie). The post-office was located in a separate building that functioned as a store.

On 12 February 1887 the mail coach travelling from Cudgelligo (Lake Cargelligo) to Whitton stopped at Rankins Springs to collect mail, before proceeding on its way. Soon after leaving Rankins Springs the driver “pulled up to open the gate at the Four Mile” when “a masked man appeared with a rifle, stuck him up, and asked him for the mail bags, pointing the gun at him at the same time”. After the robbery was reported two policemen from Darlington Point and Whitton arrived to investigate the crime. After gathering material and circumstantial evidence the constables arrested John King, a resident of Rankin's Springs and brother-in-law of the publican and postmaster, James Graham. King was taken in custody to Hay. He was tried at the Hay Quarter Sessions in March where he was found guilty by a jury and sentenced to “ten years penal servitude”.

In June 1888 the publican's licence for the Rankins Springs Hotel was transferred to Alfred Marshall, who held the licence for the next five years. The “permanent spring of fresh water” on the freehold land adjoining the hotel maintained its flow during the 1888–89 drought that devastated the Riverina region. In early 1892 there was a fire at the Rankins Springs Hotel “which destroyed the premises”.In an advertisement for a future lease of the hotel the owner (Alex. Smith of Roto) stated he intended “to erect new and suitable premises (consisting of stone hotel and kitchen, also store and post office of stone, three detached bedrooms, of timber, also commodious stable of timber, and necessary out-offices)”. The building of the stone-built hotel premises was expected to be completed in early 1893.

John Hannan took over the licence of the newly built Rankins Springs Hotel in 1893 and continued in that role until 1923, occupying the property under a series of tenancy and leasing arrangements. In about 1918–19 John Baxter purchased the hotel and the surrounding pastoral property. In September 1923 the hotel licence was transferred to William Campbell under the terms of a ten-year lease. In 1926 the Rankins Springs Hotel was described in the following terms by Sergeant Sykes, Licensing Inspector for the Licensing District of Hillston:

The hotel building is of stone and cement, and the main building is in a fair state of repair. There are five bedrooms for the use of the public and three for the use of the members of the household.

=== The village at the railway terminus ===
In January 1923 a railway line was opened connecting Rankins Springs region with Barmedman, a station on the central western railway connecting Lake Cargelligo to Cootamundra. The new railway line by-passed the site of the Rankins Springs Hotel and adjoining land (despite previous expectations that the line would go that way).The Rankins Springs station, where the branch line terminated, was built at a location 10 km (6 mi) to the south-west of the hotel. The new branch line provided transport for the agricultural produce of the surrounding district as well as passenger services.

In July 1926 the growing settlement of Rankins Springs, developing alongside the recently completed railway terminus, was described in the following terms:

The village of Rankins Springs, at the head of the railway, is growing fairly rapidly. There is a population of about 120 in the village. There are a number of buildings there, and others are being erected, including a public hall, garage, baker's shop, and store.

A series of meetings of the Hotel Licensing Board were held in 1926 and early 1927 at West Wyalong to determine the status of the licence of the Rankins Springs Hotel at the original location (north-east of the developing village at the railway terminus). It was eventually decided to transfer the licence to a new hotel to be erected on land acquired at Rankins Springs village by the hotel owner, John Baxter. The new hotel, named the Rankins Springs Hotel and described as "an up-to-date two-storey brick building", was completed by September 1928.

A police station was opened at Rankins Springs in October 1928.

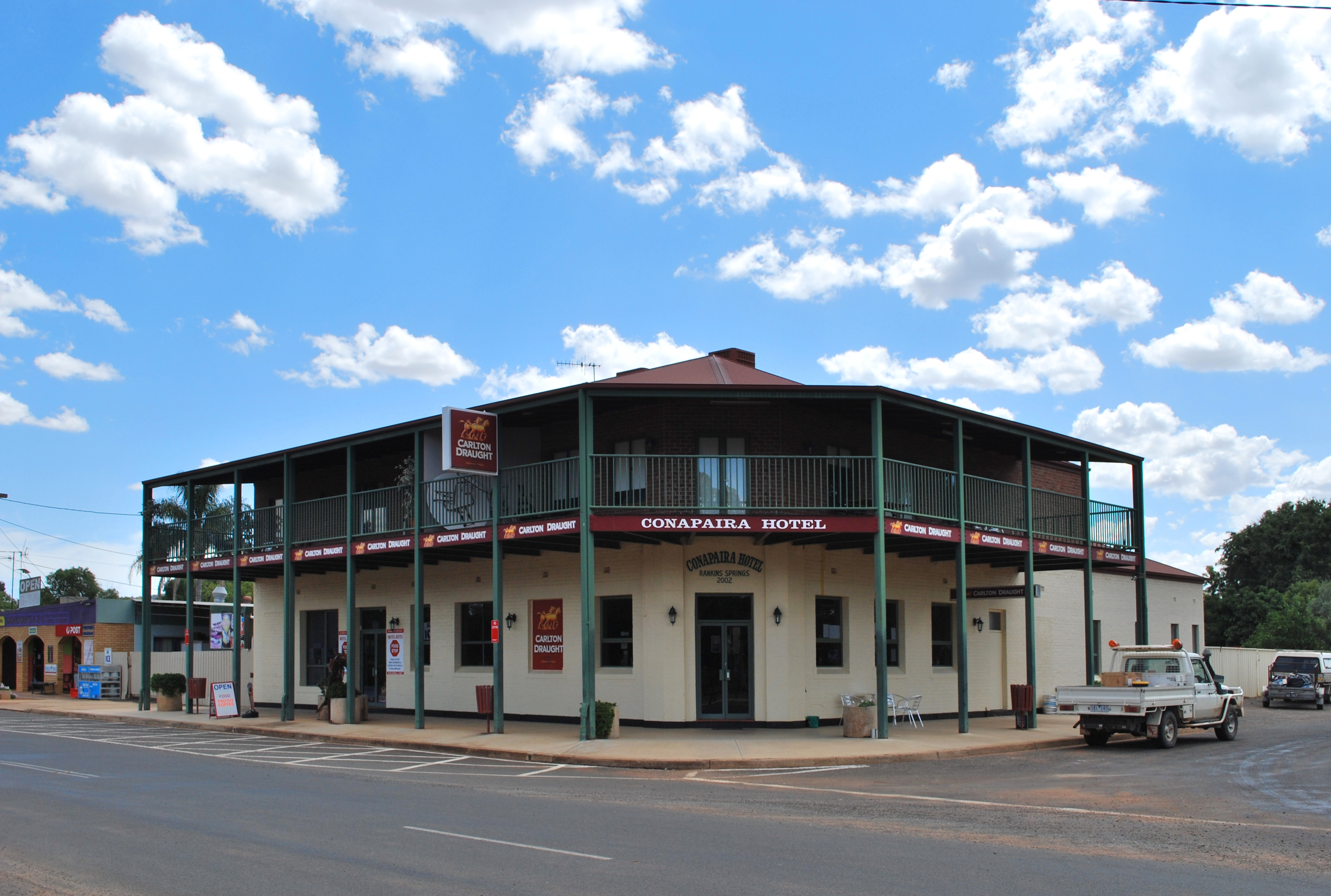
The Conapaira Hotel

The new Rankins Springs Hotel was destroyed by fire soon after it was built.Its replacement, a two-storey brick structure also called the Rankins Springs Hotel, had taken its place by early 1930 “erected at a cost of many thousands of pounds”.

On 31 May 1939 a fire "completely gutted" the Rankins Springs Hotel. The fire had started early in the morning in a billiard room adjacent to the hotel. The flames, fanned by a strong breeze, quickly spread to the top-storey of the main building with the volunteer fire fighters hampered by a “lack of fire-fighting appliances and water”. The damage was partially covered by insurance and in June 1939 the owner John Baxter called for tenders to rebuild the hotel. After the fire the licensee Fred Lucks (or Luks) carried out his business in temporary premises. A new hotel was erected at a cost of £7000 and opened in early 1941. It was “a two storey building, containing 17 bedrooms, two parlors, two lounge rooms, several bathrooms”, with “hot water connected throughout”. The new hotel, named the Conapaira Hotel, boasted a “new and modern bar which has an excellent refrigeration service” provided by a £700 “electric plant”.

In 1951 a film titled Rankins Springs is West was released by the Shell Company of Australia to promote “modern kerosene burning appliances for country folk”. Described as the story of a typical Australian country town “where city facilities of gas and electricity are not available”, the film depicts “the every day story of life of local residents”. The film was shown in country centres via the Shell Company's mobile film unit and advertised as affording the opportunity “of seeing methods by which modern kerosene burning appliances can provide even the most remote home with city standards of comfort and convenience”.

In 1974 the NSW Government carried out massive cut-backs in country rail services which included the cessation of the train passenger service to Rankins Springs.

In December 1982, in the midst of a major drought, the Canberra Times published an article representing Rankins Springs as “a township that is hanging on to life”. The village was described as a “service town for the graziers around and its main features are the petrol station, the post-office, the hotel and the caravan park”. It was observed that with improved roads “and the lure of better shopping in Griffith” the township “had been pared back to essential services”. Mrs. Dulcie Wood, who had been Rankins Springs’ post-mistress since 1967, said “the town offered little for young people who had left school”, with many having to leave the area.

In 2004 the railway grain freight service from the village ceased when the Barmedman to Rankins Springs branch line was closed.

In 2008 a water treatment plant and reticulation system for the village of Rankins Springs was completed, providing clean drinking water to the community. Residents had previously relied on raw water sources such as rainwater or untreated bore water, supplemented by transported supplies of potable water.

== Natural environment ==
The area surrounding Rankins Springs is within the Lachlan Plains subregion of the extensive Cobar Peneplain Bioregion (comprising 9.2 percent of New South Wales).

=== Birdlife ===
Rankins Springs and the surrounding district has an abundance of native fauna, with birdlife being particularly conspicuous and varied. Amongst the parrot species found in the area are the glossy black cockatoo, superb parrot and Major Mitchell's cockatoo. Threatened native bird species that can be found in the district include malleefowl, Gilbert's whistler, chestnut quail-thrush, shy heathwren and the painted honeyeater. Seven designated birdwatching sites are located in the Rankins Springs area (some of them with hides), which are strategically located to optimise the experience for birdwatchers.

=== Jimberoo National Park ===
Jimberoo National Park is located eight kilometres north of Rankins Springs. The national park was formerly a state forest dedicated in July 1979 (with extensions added in May 1981). Jimberoo National Park was reserved on 1 January 2011 and consists of 1161 hectares. It was established "to protect remaining areas of cypress pine woodlands" within "a heavily cleared agricultural region".

Jimberoo National Park is a part of the rocky ridges and foothills that extend through the Cocoparra, Conapaira and Naradhan Ranges. Woodland communities dominated by bimble box (Eucalyptus populnea), white cypress pine (Callitris glaucophylla), Dwyer's red gum (E. dwyeri) and black cypress pine (C. endlicheri) are found within the national park.

=== Pulletop Nature Reserve ===
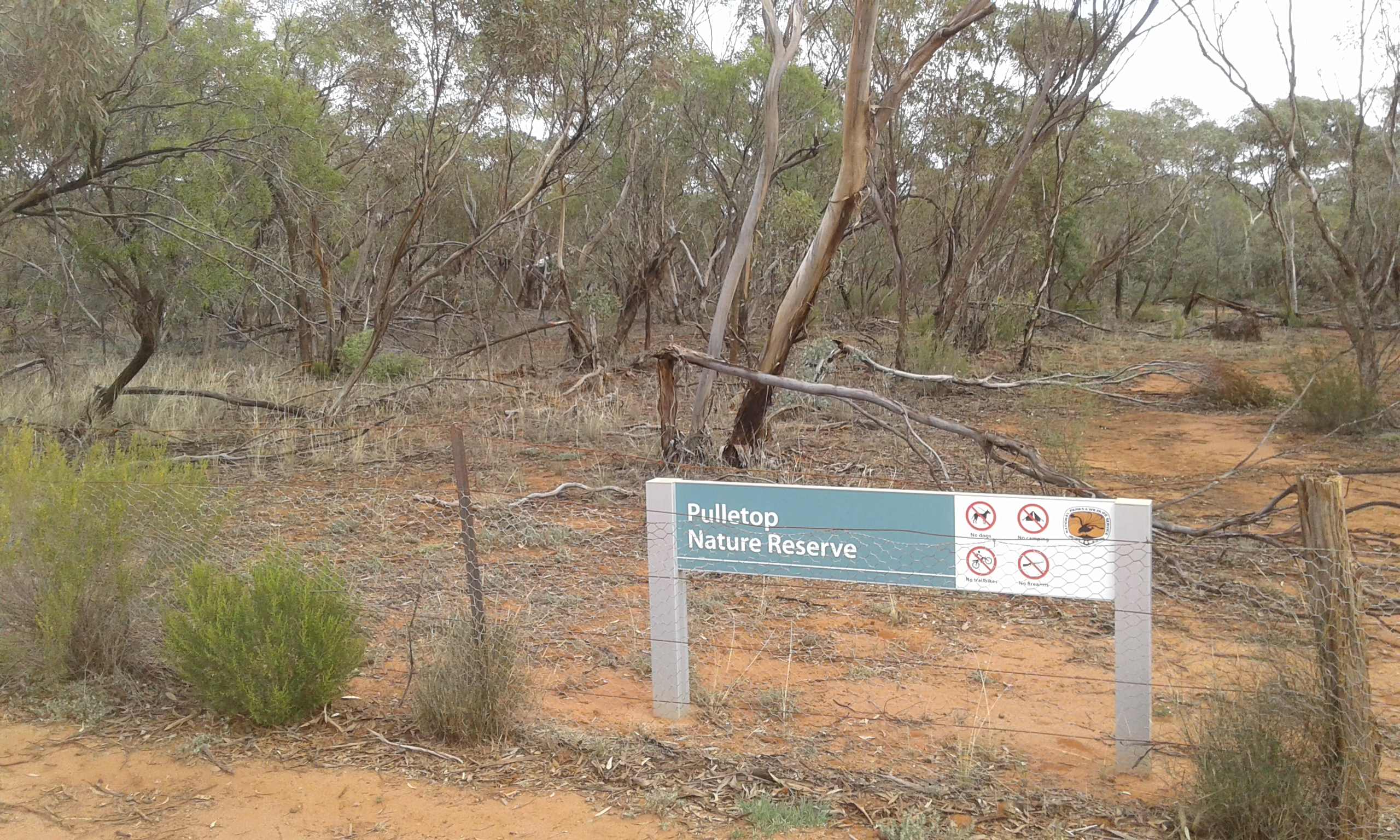
Pulletop Nature Reserve near Rankins Springs

Pulletop Nature Reserve is 22 kilometres south-west of Rankins Springs, consisting of 145 hectares of remnant mallee woodland surrounded by agricultural land. The topography of Pulletop Nature Reserve is flat to gently undulating, with highly permeable sandy loam soils. The shrub and woodland communities are dominated by four species of multi-stemmed mallee eucalypts. The area was dedicated as a reserve in 1963.

Pulletop was the location of intensive scientific research that began in 1951 into the behaviour and ecology of the malleefowl by Harry Frith, who was based at Griffith and worked for the CSIRO. Frith wrote nine scientific papers on the species as well as an important popular book, The Mallee-Fowl: The Bird That Builds an Incubator (1962), which included guidelines for malleefowl conservation.

Isolated and surrounded by cleared farmland, Pulletop Nature Reserve is a refuge of natural habitat for many native species within the region. A total of 123 mallee and woodland birds have been recorded within the reserve, although there have been significant declines of some species attributed to the small size of the reserve, its isolation within mostly cleared land and predation by cats and foxes. The reserve's emblematic species, the malleefowl, was last observed there in the 1980s and “is now considered to be locally extinct”.

=== Rankins Springs grevillea ===
A subspecies of the rosemary grevillea has the common name of the Rankins Springs grevillea (Grevillea rosmarinifolia subsp. glabella). The plant, which grows in mallee or shrub associations in sandy soils, is endemic to the Rankins Springs district extending to the region around Griffith.

=== Rankins Springs Binion ===
The Rankins Springs Binion (Amalgamation: Bin and Minion) is a classic Australian attraction that brings many travellers joy when stopping in the town. Created in 2015 after the success of the Minions movie, the artwork produced from this blockbuster movie continues to bring joy the close-knit community and travellers.

== Gallery ==
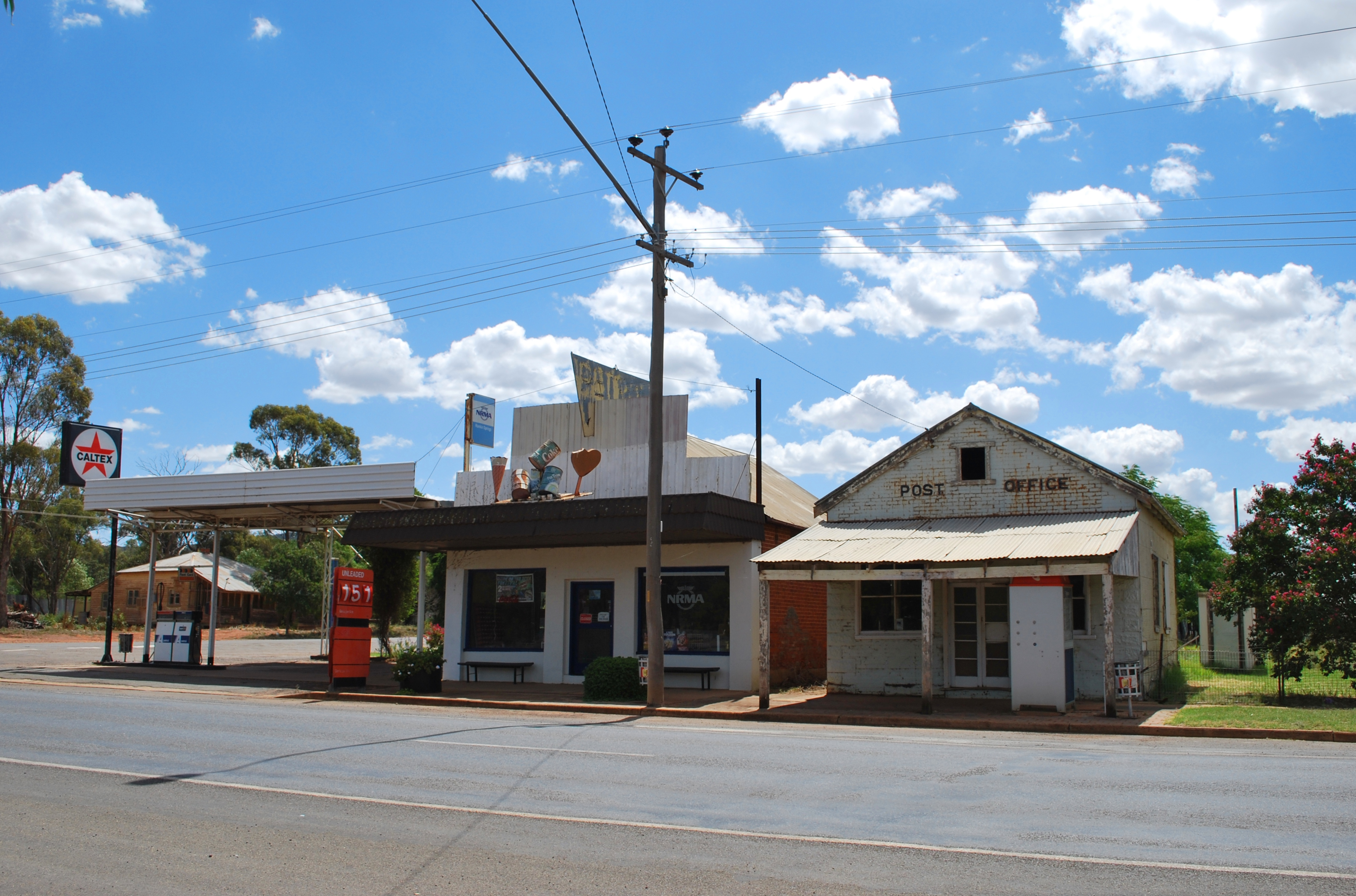
Post office and petrol station

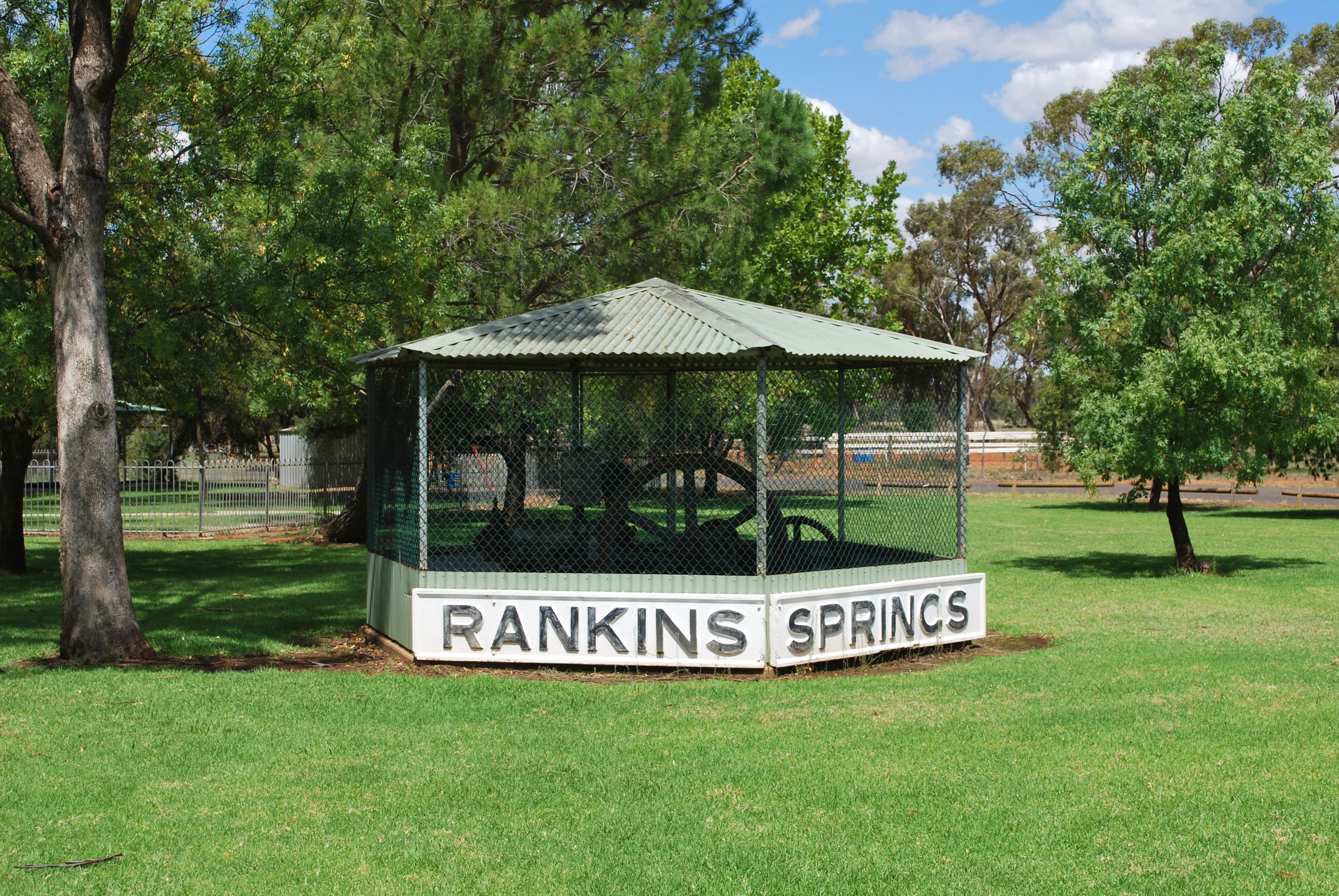
Relocated train station sign

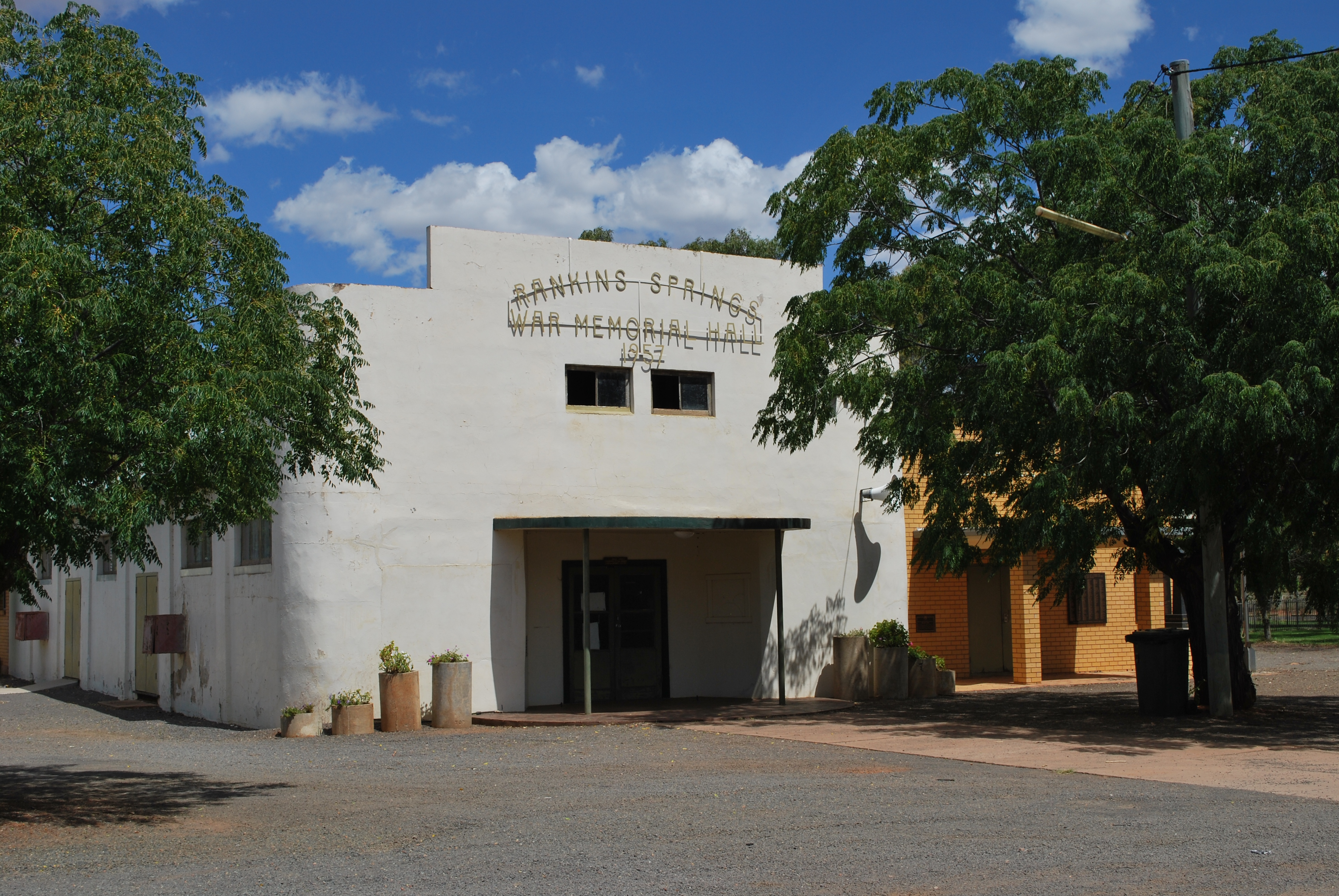
War Memorial Hall
