= The Mallee-Fowl =

1962 non-fiction book by Harold Frith

- First edition
- Author: H.J. Frith
- Language: English
- Subject: Malleefowl
- Genre: Zoology
- Publisher: Angus & Robertson: Sydney
- Publication date: 1962
- Publication place: Australia
- Media type: Print (hardcover)
- Pages: xii + 136

The Mallee-Fowl is a book published by Angus & Robertson in 1962, with the subtitle The Bird that Builds an Incubator. It was authored by Australian ornithologist Harry Frith. It was issued in octavo format (224 x 140 mm), containing 148 pages, bound in dark red cloth with a dust jacket illustrated by a photograph of a malleefowl. The book contains numerous black-and-white photographs by the author, and is dedicated to "Joe" (one of the subjects of Frith's research).

The book was reviewed in the Emu by Jack Jones (as J.J.), who says:

"The Mallee-Fowl" is an important work in Australian ornithology. It is the first book for public appraisal of a life history obtained by extensive and methodic research in field and laboratory. Its subject – an extraordinary bird species now moving towards rarity through man's indifference – requires such a public book in support of a major and urgent conservation task revealed. The research was done by Frith during 1951 to 1958, at first in private week-end activity, then as a project of the Wildlife Survey Section (now the Division of Wildlife Research, of which Frith is the Chief) of the Commonwealth Scientific and Industrial Research Organisation (CSIRO), with assistance at times by colleagues."

"The Mallee-Fowl" is subtitled "The Bird that Builds an Incubator". Frith's research was centred on the incubating mound in methodic enquiry of cycle and control; and from that real dominance the enquiry circled out to obtain and collate the remaining substance of life history into relativity, including conservation problems in predation, grazing and clearing for farming. Development of census methods was a necessary corollary. The book bears the research accent by being concerned mainly with life-history detail and gaining of knowledge. It also includes adequate comparison with the other Megapode species, notably the Brush-Turkey and Jungle-Fowl; it speculates briefly on the origin and development of mound incubation in an arid climate; and concludes with a succinct chapter of emphatic appeal for conservation of the Mallee-Fowl."
