= Aussie Bird Count =

Australian citizen science project

The Aussie Bird Count is a project of BirdLife Australia. It is a citizen science project in which volunteers conduct bird counts around Australia.

In the 2017 bird count, almost two million birds were counted.

In 2022, the project was renamed from the Aussie Backyard Bird Count to the Aussie Bird Count to reflect the ability to count in any outdoor space.

== See also ==
- Australian Bird Count
- BioBlitz ("24-hour inventory")
- Breeding Bird Survey
- Christmas Bird Count (CBC) (in the Western Hemisphere)
- Systematic Census of Australian Plants
- Tucson Bird Count (TBC) (in Arizona in the US)
