= Avian ecology field methods =

There are many field methods available for conducting avian ecological research. They can be divided into three types: counts, nest monitoring, and capturing and marking.

== Basic counts ==
Basic bird counts are a good way to estimate population size, detect changes in population size or species diversity, and determine the cause of the changes if environmental or habitat data is collected as well. Basic bird counts can be completed fairly easily and inexpensively, and they provide general information about the status of a bird population.

Birds can be directly counted on breeding colonies, and at roosts, flocks, or Leks. Large diurnal migrants, like many raptors, can be counted as they pass through migration bottlenecks. Small nocturnal migrants are harder to count, but many advances have been made in the use of radar and microphone arrays to identify and count them.

=== Point counts and area searches ===
Perhaps the simplest method of counting birds is called a "point count", in which a trained observer records all the birds seen and heard from a point count station for a set period of time. A series of point counts completed over a fixed route can then be compared to the results of the same point counts in other seasons or years. A similar method, called an area search, involves searching throughout a fixed area for a set amount of time and recording the number of birds seen and heard.

== Nest monitoring ==
Nest monitoring is essential for measuring the reproductive success of a population, which is important for identifying changes in a population's birth rate. Nests can be found either through systematic searching of the birds’ preferred habitat or by watching birds for behavioral clues. A researcher can then track the success of each nest by regularly checking nests for signs of hatching, fledging, or predation.

Nest monitoring can also provide extremely valuable information about nesting behavior, habitat selection, and nest predation. Cameras can be used to monitor nest and record information about nest survival, nesting behaviors, or even to catch nest predators in the act. The timing of breeding in relation to weather variables can be studied, as well as the size of eggs and chicks in relation to food quality and abundance. Records of habitat variables at each nest provide helpful information on the birds’ nest site selection criteria, and maps of all nests found in a study area allow for examination of how territories are distributed through the habitat.

== Capturing and marking ==
Capturing and marking birds allows for individuals to be identified whenever or wherever they are captured or seen again. It is a powerful method for studying bird migration, estimating population sizes and survival rates, and recognizing changes in productivity. There are many different ways to capture birds, but the most widely used method is a mist net, a net made of fine nylon mesh which is nearly invisible. Birds fly into the net, becoming entangled, and are extracted by researchers. Birds can then be identified, measured, weighed, and marked with a small aluminum band bearing a unique number. The number is reported to a central database so that information about the bird can be updated if the bird is ever recaptured somewhere else. Birds may also be marked with a locally unique combination of colored plastic leg bands, leg flags, patagial tags, or dyes which allow the bird to be recognized in the field without requiring recapture. Finally, a bird may be outfitted with a radio or satellite transmitter, which enables the bird to be tracked as it moves around within the local landscape or even as it migrates around the world.

== See also ==
- Australian Bird Count (ABC)
- Breeding Bird Survey
- Christmas Bird Count (CBC) (in the Western Hemisphere)
- Seabird Colony Register (SCR)
- The EBCC Atlas of European Breeding Birds
- Tucson Bird Count (TBC) (in Arizona in the US)
