= Frith (surname) =

Frith is a surname. Notable people with the surname include:

- Anthony Frith, Australian director of the 2025 documentary film Mockbuster
- Benjamin Frith (b.1957), British pianist
- Billy Frith (1912–1996), English football club manager
- Clifford Frith (artist), Australian artist, co-founder of the Experimental Art Foundation in Adelaide in 1974
- Clifford Brodie Frith (b.1949), Australian ornithologist
- Chris Frith (b.1942), British psychologist
- David Frith (b.1937), British cricket writer
- Dawn Whyatt Frith, Australian ornithologist
- Doug Frith (1945–2009), Canadian politician
- Francis Frith (1822–1898), British photographer
- Fred Frith (b.1949), British musician
- Freddie Frith (1909–1988), British Grand Prix motorcycle road racing World Champion
- Harold James Frith (1921–1982), Australian ornithologist
- Heather Frith (b.1967), Bermudian singer-songwriter and poet Heather Nova
- Hezekiah Frith (1763–1848), Bermudian, "Gentleman" Privateer and British Ship Owner, engaged in Piracy in the 1790s
- James Frith (b.1977), British politician
- John Frith (disambiguation)
- Mark Frith (journalist) (b.1970), British journalist
- Mary Frith (1584–1659), English pickpocket
- Michael K. Frith (b.1941), British artist and television producer
- Royce Frith (1923–2005), Canadian diplomat and politician
- Simon Frith (b.1946), British musicologist
- Uta Frith (b.1941), British developmental psychologist
- Walter Frith (1856–1941), English dramatist and novelist
- William Frith (disambiguation)

== See also ==
- Frith
- Firth (surname)
