= Hugh Ford =

Hugh Ford may refer to:

- Hugh Ford (director) (1868–1952), American film director and screenwriter
- Hugh Ford (engineer) (1913–2010), British engineer
- Hugh Alastair Ford (born 1946), Australian ornithologist

== See also ==
- Hugh Forde (disambiguation)
