= BirdLife Australia =

Australian bird conservation organisation

Coordinates: 37.8049°S 144.9608°E

- Type: company limited by guarantee
- Industry: conservation and research
- Founded: 2012
- Headquarters: Level 2, Main Building, 54 Wellington St Collingwood, Melbourne VIC Australia
- Area served: Australia
- Key people: Kate Millar; Chief Executive Officer
- Revenue: 12,921,222 Australian dollar (2023)
- Total assets: 21,330,851 Australian dollar (2023)
- Number of employees: c.75 (2020)
- Website: www.birdlife.org.au

BirdLife Australia is Australia's largest bird conservation charity, made up of hundreds of thousands of members, volunteers and supporters across the country.

BirdLife Australia is the trading name of the company limited by guarantee formed through the merger of two Australian non-government conservation organisations, Bird Observation and Conservation Australia (BOCA) and Birds Australia. A constitution was drafted in May 2011 for BirdLife Australia, which became operational on 1 January 2012 and updated on 24 May 2014. Their respective magazines, the Bird Observer and Wingspan, were succeeded by Australian Birdlife.

== History ==
At simultaneous annual general meetings held on 21 May 2011, the respective members of BOCA and Birds Australia voted to merge and form the new company. Over 93% of those that voted from BOCA voted for the merger and over 95% of those that voted from Birds Australia voted for the merger. A combined total of 4517 Birds Australia and BOCA members voted on the resolution, with over 36% of Birds Australia members and more than 50% of BOCA members voting. This was the biggest response to a proposed resolution that either organisation had ever received.

With the merger, BirdLife Australia became the Australian national partner organisation of BirdLife International, a role hitherto performed by Birds Australia.

The inaugural Board of Directors was made up of five board members from each of the merging organisations, with the addition of a "neutral" chair, Gerard Early, who retired as a board member in May 2026.

The inaugural chief executive officer (CEO), Dr Graeme Hamilton, resigned in October 2012. Hamilton was CEO of Birds Australia from 2005 to 2011, and CEO of BOCA in its final months of operation in 2011. James O'Connor was interim CEO from October 2012, until the appointment of Paul Sullivan in January 2013.

Following the merger, BirdLife Australia undertook an organisational review to address a large operating deficit, a reduction in net assets and the loss of $1.9m a year in federal grants due to Caring for Country and Biodiversity Fund cutsannounced in 2013. BirdLife Australia adopted a new five-year strategy and financing plan along with a restructure to align the newly merged organisation’s activities with shared bird conservation goals.

The organisation’s post-merger financial performance was characterised by a deliberate transition from a dependence on government grants toward a broader and more diversified revenue model. BirdLife Australia expanded its focus on philanthropic and supporter fundraising as well as corporate partnerships and social enterprise. The shift attracted criticism from some members.

BirdLife Australia launched the first Aussie Backyard Bird Count in October 2014, using mass participation citizen science to create new pathways into conservation action.

John Barkla was elected President of BirdLife Australia in May 2017 and served until June 2020. A former BOCA President, he also served on the Finance & Audit Committee of Birds Australia. John Barkla was a strong advocate for the merger in 2012 to create a unified national voice for birds.

Martine Maron BSc (Hons), PhD (Monash), Professor in Environmental Management at The University of Queensland succeeded John Barkla as President in May 2020.

Post Covid, BirdLife Australia invested in a major digital transformation project involving the implementation of a new website, re-brand and Salesforce-based customer relationship management platform; integrating fundraising, membership and supporter engagement to support growth and improve the supporter experience.

In 2022, BirdLife Australia launched an ambitious Save Birds. Save Life. Bird Conservation Strategy, aligned to the Kunming-Montreal Global Biodiversity Framework, to stop human-driven extinction of threatened birds by 2032, improve the status of at least 30% of threatened bird species by 2032, and halt overall bird declines by 2050. The impetus was to address the systemic drivers of biodiversity loss.

Kate Millar was appointed as CEO in July 2023, along with the election of a new President Mandy Bamford.

A key milestone of the new strategy was delivered in 2025, with the release of the AVISTEP tool, developed in partnership with BirdLife International. The risk-based tool makes it easier for the renewable energy sector to plan and operate infrastructure in ways that are safer for nature.

Prof. Hugh Possingham was elected President in 2026.

== Constitution ==
The constitution of BirdLife Australia is loosely based on the constitutions of the merging bodies. The organisation is member-based, and board members are elected by the membership at an annual general meeting. The constitution also describes a transitional period for the board for its first three years of operation, whereby two members of each original board will stand down at each annual general meeting. It was updated in May 2014 to co-opt directors with complementary skills while protecting members' majority voting rights.

== Operations ==
BirdLife Australia's national office at 60 Leicester Street Carlton, Victoria, was the former Birds Australia office. The BOCA office in Nunawading, Victoria was sold by BirdLife Australia in 2017. BirdLife Australia later relocated to 54 Wellington Street, Collingwood.

The charity operates a network of over 30 regional branches and four Special Interest Groups across the country. These volunteer-led groups organise local birdwatching outings, conservation projects, and community surveys. BirdLife Southern NSW is based at the Birdlife Discovery Centre at Sydney Olympic Park in Homebush, New South Wales, and BirdLife WA leases premises in Floreat, West Australia.

BirdLife Australia owns and operates Gluepot Reserve, a 540 square kilometres (210 square miles) reserve for bird conservation and research in the South Australian semi-arid mallee region and the Clarkesdale Bird Sanctuary near Ballarat. The organisation also leases two bird observatories in West Australia, the Broome Bird Observatory and the Eyre Bird Observatory.

== Programs ==
Post merger, BirdLife Australia evolved its activities from largely species-based conservation projects toward landscape-scale, integrated programs. Major programs include Woodland Birds, Migratory Shorebirds, Key Biodiversity Areas, Urban Birds (previously Birds in Backyards), Beach-nesting Birds, Birds on Farms, Threatened Mallee Birds and Emergency Interventions / Preventing Extinctions.

Most programs use long-term Conservation Action Planning frameworks to combine research, habitat restoration, monitoring, policy advocacy, partnerships and community engagement. The approach followed a large-scale bushfire at Ngarkat Conservation Park in 2014 which wiped out the South Australia population of Mallee Emu Wren . BirdLife Australia held an emergency summit and pioneered a collaborative, cross-border, multi-species action plan for threatened Mallee Birds.

The Emergency Interventions program initially used NESP research to target the urgent recovery of bird species considered to be at greatest risk of extinction. BirdLife Australia led the introduction of Key Biodiversity Areas (KBA) (previously Important Bird Areas) in Australia. In 2014, the KBAs In Danger campaign reached 8.4 million people and mobilised action to protect critical habitat for threatened birds.

The Urban Birds Program evolved from Birds in Backyards and the Aussie Backyard Bird Count to focus on conserving birds in cities and towns.

Citizen science and national monitoring programs have become increasingly important components of BirdLife Australia’s activities. The Atlas of Australian Birds created by Birds Australia in 1977 relied on manual structured surveys to map the distribution and abundance of the continent's bird species. The Birdata web portal, created in 2005 and relaunched in 2016 with a smart phone app, put the power of data entry into the hands of volunteers. The use of structured, scientifically sound, bird survey data is used to inform:

- the adaptive management of BirdLife Australia’s conservation programs
- State of Australia's Birds as indicators of environmental health
- the Threatened Bird Index
- the Action Plan for Australia’s Birds
- Key Biodiversity Area monitoring
- State datasets (also publicly accessible).
- targeted conservation for Australian threatened birds impacted by the 2019–20 bush fires.
- AVISTEP planning tool for the renewables sector

In partnership with Charles Darwin University, the Action Plan for Australian Birds 2020 identified 216 threatened birds in Australia compared to 195 ten years ago. The plan outlines conservation actions to avoid further decline of bird populations.

=== Regional groups ===
Birds Australia Northern NSW (BANN) is a regional group of Birds Australia based in northern New South Wales. BANN was formed in 1987 following a campout by RAOU members at Dorrigo the previous year. Members of Birds Australia who are residents of the area of coverage are automatically members of the group. A quarterly newsletter is sent to members. Activities provided for members include meetings, a variety of field trips, bird surveys, and conservation projects.

Birds Australia Western Australia (BAWA) is the Western Australian regional group of Birds Australia. BAWA was formed in 1943 and incorporated in 2001. Members of Birds Australia resident in Western Australia are automatically members of BAWA. BAWA maintains an office, Peregrine House, at Floreat, Perth. It also publishes a quarterly newsletter, WA Bird Notes. Activities provided for members include monthly meetings, a variety of excursions ranging from half-day outings to extensive campouts, bird surveys and conservation projects.

=== Special Interest Groups ===
BirdLife Australia has four volunteer run Special Interest Groups: the Australasian Seabird Group, the BirdLife Australia Raptor Group, the BirdLife Photography Group and the Australasian Wader Studies Group.

The Australasian Wader Studies Group (AWSG), established in 1981, is a special interest group of BirdLife Australia. It publishes a journal, The Stilt, usually twice a year, with occasional extra issues. Its mission statement is "to ensure the future of waders (shorebirds) and their habitats in Australia through research and conservation programs and to encourage and assist similar programmes in the rest of the East Asian–Australasian Flyway".

The AWSG organises the nearly annual series of North-West Australia Wader Expeditions, which use experienced international cannon netting teams to catch and study the very large numbers of migratory waders that visit the beaches of Roebuck Bay near Broome, Eighty Mile Beach and Port Hedland in north-west Western Australia.

==== AWSG Objectives ====
- To monitor wader populations through a programme of counting and banding in order to collect data on changes on a local, national and international basis.
- To study the migrations of waders through a program of counting, banding, colour-flagging and collection of biometric data.
- To instigate and encourage other scientific studies of waders such as feeding and breeding studies.
- To communicate the results of these studies to a wide audience through the Stilt, the Tattler, other journals, the internet, the media, conferences and lectures.
- To formulate and promote policies for the conservation of waders and their habitat, and to make available information to local and national governmental conservation bodies and other organisations to encourage and assist them in pursuing this objective.
- To encourage and promote the involvement of a large band of amateurs, as well as professionals, to achieve these objectives.

== Awards ==
The organisation awards a number of regular prizes.

The Stuart Leslie Bird Research Award and the Professor Alan Keast Award are bestowed annually to postgraduate students of ornithology, with an emphasis on conservation applications. The Indigenous Grant for Bird Research and Conservation acknowledges the contribution of Indigenous Australians by facilitating their further engagement in research and conservation.

=== Honorary Life Members ===
Honorary Life Membership recognises exceptional, long-term contributions to the organisation and its mission of bird conservation. Membership is limited to 20 people and is considered the highest recognition available to members for service to BirdLife Australia. Current members include: Kate Armstrong, John Barkla, Suzanne Mather, Iain Paterson, Dr Patricia Bingham, Geoff Deason, Howard Plowright, John Rankin, Gerard Early, Sheena Gillman, Alison Russell-French OAM, Brian Snape AM, Judith Harrington, Duncan Mackenzie OAM and Patricia White.

=== Fellows ===
Fellow of BirdLife Australia honours professionals and amateurs who have made extraordinary contributions to the scientific understanding and protection of birdlife. Membership is limited to 20 people and recognises distinguished services to ornithology, conservation, and research. Current members include: Dr Barry Baker, Dr Mike Bamford, Professor Kate Buchanan, Dr Allan Burbidge, Emeritus Professor Mike Clarke, Sid Cowling, Dr Peter Dann, Professor Hugh Ford, Professor Stephen Garnett, Dr Philip Moors AO, Dr Mike Newman, Assoc. Prof. Penny Olsen AM and Jim Radford.

=== J. N. Hobbs Memorial Medal ===
The J. N. Hobbs Memorial Medal may be awarded annually for "outstanding contributions to ornithology as an amateur scientist". It commemorates John Hobbs (1923–1990) and was first awarded in 1995.

List of recipients

- 1995 – Selwyn George (Bill) Lane
- 1996 – Durno Murray
- 1997 – Stephen Marchant
- 1998 – Alan Leishman
- 1999 – John Courtney
- 2000 – Clive Minton
- 2001 – Pauline Reilly
- 2002 – no award
- 2003 – Brian Coates
- 2004 – Graeme Chapman
- 2005 – Graham Pizzey
- 2006 – no award
- 2007 – no award
- 2008 – Kevin Alan Wood
- 2009 – Michael J. Carter
- 2010 – Andrew Ley
- 2011 – no award
- 2012 – Mike Newman
- 2013 – no award
- 2014 – Lloyd Nielsen
- 2015 – Lynn Pedler
- 2016 – A.B. (Tony) Rose
- 2017 - Ken Gosbell
- 2018 - Andrew Barham Black OAM
- 2019 - Dick (RM) Cooper
- 2020 - Alan Stuart PhD
- 2021 - Ian Arthur William McAllan
- 2022 - Jon Coleman
- 2023 - Rosalind Jessop
- 2024 - Brian Venables
- 2025 - Ann Lindsey

=== D. L. Serventy Medal ===
The D.L. Serventy Medal may be awarded annually for outstanding published work on birds in the Australasian region. It commemorates Dr. Dominic Serventy (1904–1988) and was first awarded in 1991.

List of recipients

- 1991 - Ian Rowley
- 1992 - John Warham
- 1993 - Hugh Ford
- 1994 - Harry Recher
- 1995 - Allen Keast
- 1996 - Cliff Frith and Dawn Frith
- 1997 - Penny Olsen
- 1998 - Richard Zann
- 1999 - Jiro Kikkawa
- 2000 - (no award)
- 2001 - John Woinarski
- 2002 - (no award)
- 2003 - Trevor Worthy and Richard N. Holdaway
- 2004 - Andrew Cockburn
- 2005 - Lesley Brooker and Michael Brooker
- 2006 - Denis A. Saunders
- 2007 - Michael Clarke
- 2008 - Stephen Garnett and Gabriel Crowley
- 2009 - Carla P. Catterall
- 2010 - David Lindenmayer
- 2011 - David Paton
- 2012 - Richard Kingsford
- 2013 - Ron Wooller
- 2014 - Richard Loyn
- 2015 - Stephen Debus
- 2016 - Sonia Kleindorfer
- 2017 - Sarah Legge
- 2018 - Leo George Joseph
- 2019 - Naomi Langmore
- 2020 - Ralph Mac Nally
- 2021 - Andrew F. Bennett
- 2022 - Eric Woehler
- 2023 - Robert Heinsohn
- 2024 - Richard Fuller

== Publications ==
Selection of publications:

- Australian Birdlife Newsletter
- Emu - Austral Ornithology scientific journal
- Handbook of Australian, New Zealand and Antarctic Birds (HANZAB, 7 volumes), ISBN 9780195550368

== See also ==
- Australian Bird Calls
- Australian Field Ornithology
- Australasian Raptor Association
- Egg Collecting and Bird Life of Australia
- Australasian Ornithological Conference
- Birds of Australia
