= Leishman =

Leishman is a surname. Notable people with the surname include:

- Alan Leishman, Australian garden administrator and amateur ornithologist
- Brian Leishman, Scottish politician
- Jim Leishman (born 1953), Scottish politician and former professional footballer
- John George Alexander Leishman (1857–1924), American businessman and diplomat
- Ken Leishman (1931–1979), also known as the Flying Bandit or the Gentleman Bandit, Canadian criminal responsible for multiple robberies between 1957 and 1966
- Larry Leishman (1947–2013), Scottish-born Canadian guitarist
- Marc Leishman (born 1983), Australian golfer
- Mark Leishman (born 1956), New Zealand broadcaster
- Melanie Leishman (born 1989), Canadian actress
- Phillip Leishman (1951–2013), New Zealand broadcaster
- Tommy Leishman (1937–2021), Scottish professional footballer
- William Boog Leishman (1865–1926), Scottish pathologist and British Army medical officer best known for discovering Leishmaniasis and preparing Leishman stain
