= Recher =

Recher is a surname. Notable people with the surname include:

- Charles Recher (c. 1950–2017), American installation artist and filmmaker
- Dave Recher (born 1942), American football player
- Fabian Recher (born 1999), Swiss para-cyclist
- Harry Frederick Recher, Australian ornithologist
