= Australian Bird Count =

Project of the Royal Australasian Ornithologists Union (RAOU)

The Australian Bird Count (ABC) was a project of the Royal Australasian Ornithologists Union (RAOU). Following the first and successful Atlas of Australian Birds project, which led to the publication of a book on the distribution of Australian birds in 1984, it was suggested by Ken Rogers that the RAOU should next look at bird migration and other movements in Australia. Methodology for a suitable project involving volunteers was worked out through experimental fieldwork and a workshop on ‘Monitoring the Populations and Movements of Australian Birds’.

A project manager, [Stephen Ambrose], was appointed and project fieldwork ran from January 1989 to August 1995. Some 950 volunteer observers carried out 79,000 surveys, for fixed 20-minute periods in 1700 three-hectare locations over Australia.

Project management started at the Australian Museum in Sydney and was later moved to the RAOU National Office in Melbourne. Financial support came at first from the Australian Nature Conservation Agency and subsequently from BP Australia which pledged A$260,000 to the project over five years.

While much of the data has yet to be analysed, significant seasonal movements of several species of birds, (demonstrated through geographical shifts in seasonal abundance) have been quantified. A report on some of the findings of the project was published as a supplement to the RAOU's magazine Wingspan in 1999.

== See also ==
- Aussie Backyard Bird Count
- BioBlitz ("24-hour inventory")
- Breeding Bird Survey
- Christmas Bird Count (CBC) (in the Western Hemisphere)
- Systematic Census of Australian Plants
- Tucson Bird Count (TBC) (in Arizona in the US)
