= Penny Olsen =

Australian ornithologist and author

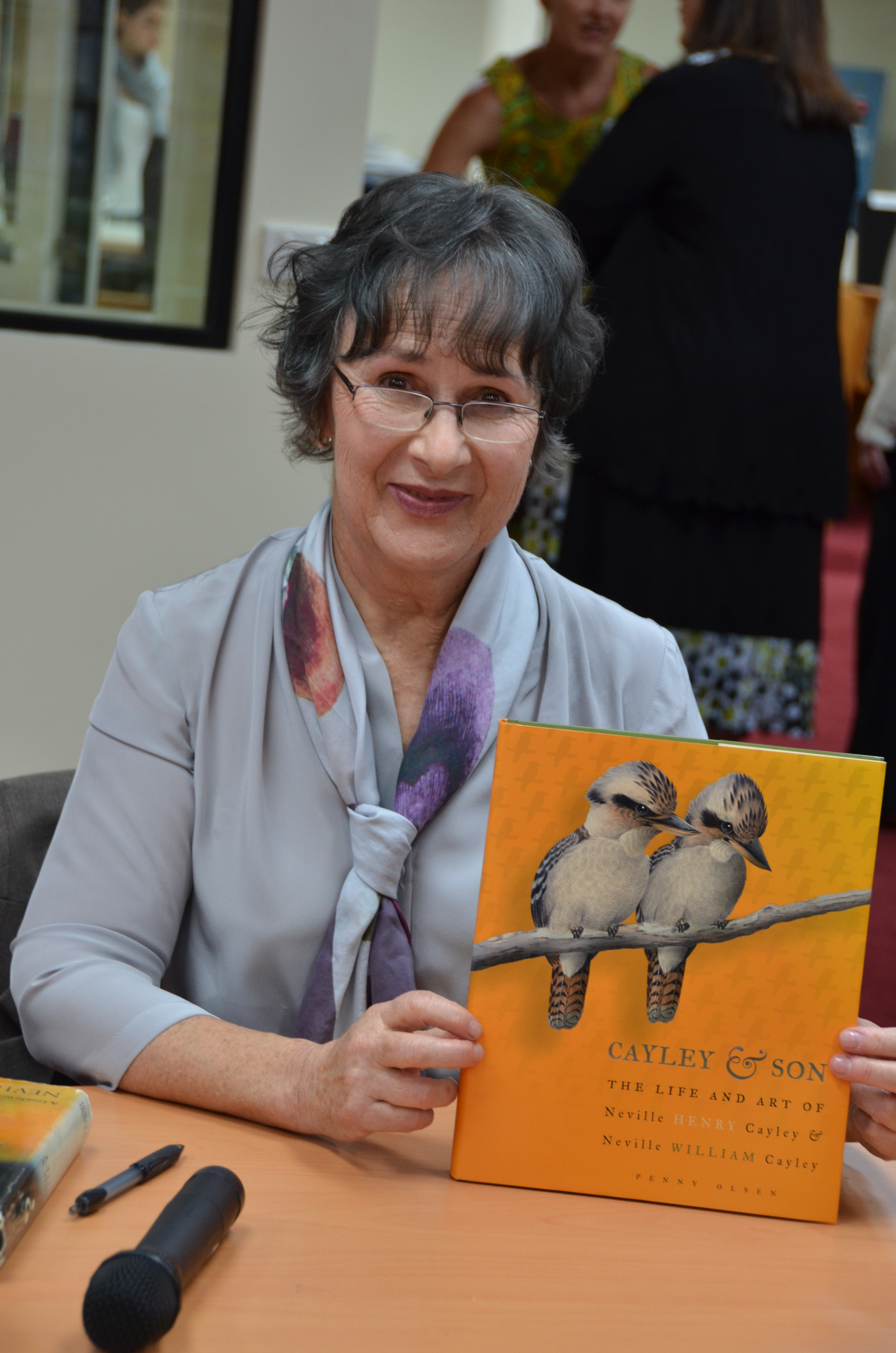
- Penny Olsen in 2013
- Born: 1949 (age 76–77)
- Scientific career
- Workplaces: Australian National University

Penelope Diane Olsen AM (born 1949) is an Australian ornithologist and author.

== Career ==
Olsen worked with CSIRO as an experimental officer and an Honorary Research Associate, as well as being an ARC Postdoctoral Fellow at the Australian National University.

She has published extensively on raptors, and was involved in the conservation work on Norfolk Island for the Norfolk Island Boobook. She was President of the Australasian Raptor Association 1984–1989.

In 1997 she was awarded the Royal Australasian Ornithologists Union's D.L. Serventy Medal for excellence in published work on birds in the Australasian region.

Olsen published several award winning books on science, and was editor of Wingspan, an ornithology magazine published by Birds Australia. She was awarded a Member of the Order of Australia (AM) in 2011 for "service to the conservation sciences as an author and researcher, and through the study and documentation of Australian bird species and their history."

== Bibliography ==
=== Books ===
- Olsen, Penny, ed. (1993). Australian raptor studies. Australasian Raptor Association Conference (Canberra, 1989). Moonee Ponds, Vic.: Australasian Raptor Association, Royal Australasian Ornithologists Union.
- — (1995). Australian birds of prey : the biology and ecology of raptors. Sydney: UNSW Press.
- — (2001). Feather and brush : two centuries of Australian bird art. Melbourne: CSIRO Publishing.
- — (2005). Wedge-tailed eagle. Australian Natural History Series. Melbourne: CSIRO Publishing.
- Olsen, Penny (2007). Glimpses of paradise : the quest for the Beautiful Parakeet. Canberra: National Library of Australia.
- Olsen, Penny. (2010). Upside Down World: Early European Impressions of Australia's Curious Animals, National Library of Australia: Canberra.
- Olsen, Penny. (adapted). (2010). The Best Nest, National Library of Australia: Canberra. ISBN 978-0-642-27704-6 (pbk)
- Olsen, Penny. (2012). Our Nest is Best!, National Library of Australia: Canberra. ISBN 978-0-642-27737-4 (hbk)
- Olsen, Penny. (2013). Have You Seen My Egg?, National Library of Australia: Canberra. ISBN 978-0-642-27788-6 (pbk)
- — (2014). An eye for nature : the life and art of William T. Cooper. Canberra: NLA Publishing.
- — (2015). Louisa Atkinson's nature notes.

=== Articles ===
- Olsen, Penny (March 2009). "The independent ornithologist". The National Library Magazine. 1 (1). National Library of Australia: 18–20. Archived from the original on 12 February 2014. (Note: François Le Vaillant.)
- — (December 2010). "Nature seems determined to have a bit of a play". The National Library Magazine. 2 (4). National Library of Australia: 2–7. Archived from the original on 26 May 2015.
- Braby, Michael & Penny Olsen (December 2011). "A flutter of butterflies". The National Library Magazine. 3 (4). National Library of Australia: 8–10. Archived from the original on 26 May 2015.
- Olsen, Penny (June 2013). "Appealing to the ladies". The National Library Magazine. 5 (2): 12–15. Archived from the original on 26 May 2015. (Note: Ferdinand von Mueller.)
- — (March 2015). "Of moths and King-Parrots : on the trail of a colonial natural history artist". The National Library of Australia Magazine. 7 (1): 24–27. Archived from the original on 22 June 2015.
- — (June 2015). "Sidney William Jackson : collector and tree-climber" (PDF). The National Library of Australia Magazine. 7 (2): 12–15.
- — (December 2015). "Farewell William Thomas Cooper, 1934–2015". The National Library of Australia Magazine. 7 (4): 24–27.

———————

== Awards ==
- 1996 - Whitley Award, Royal Zoological Society of New South Wales
- 1997 - D. L. Serventy Medal, Birds Australia
- 2011 - Member of the Order of Australia (AM)
- 2019 - Fellow, BirdLife Australia
