= Boobook =

Boobook may refer to:

- Boobook, a common name for many species of owl in the genus Ninox
- Boobook, journal of the Australasian Raptor Association
- Boobook Society, an association of academics founded by John Latham and Frederic Eggleston
