= Stilt (disambiguation) =

Stilts may refer to:

- Stilts, leg-attached poles serving to increase one's height
- Stilts (architecture), poles, posts or pillars used to allow a structure or building to stand at a distance above the ground.
- Stilt, a wading bird of the genus Himantopus or Cladorhynchus in the family Recurvirostridae
- Stilt (journal), the ornithological journal of the Australasian Wader Studies Group
- "Stilts" (Malcolm in the Middle), the 20th episode of the 6th season of Malcolm in the Middle
- Stilts of Stilt house or pilotis
- Stilt (ceramics) small supports used when firing glazed ceramics to separate them
- Dakota "Stilts" Albritton, American baseball player for the Savannah Bananas
