= The State of Australia's Birds =

Australian magazine

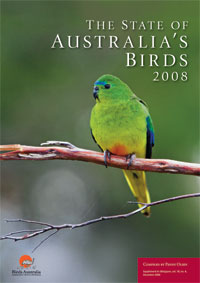
- SOAB 2008 Cover
- Editor/compiler: Various
- Former editors: Penny Olsen, Mike Weston, Ross Cunningham, Andrew Silcocks, Chris Tzaros, David Paton, James O'Connor, Julie Kirkwood
- Staff writers: James O'Connor, John Peter, Julie Kirkwood, Samantha Vine, Andrew Silcocks, Glenn Ehmke, Dean Ingwersen, Chris Tzaros
- Categories: Birds, Ornithology
- Frequency: Annual
- Circulation: 8000-10000
- Publisher: Birds Australia
- First issue: 2003
- Company: Royal Australasian Ornithologists Union
- Country: Australia
- Based in: Melbourne
- Language: English
- Website: www.birdsaustralia.com.au
- ISSN: 1036-7810

The State of Australia's Birds (SOAB) is a report series that tracks trends in Australia's bird populations.

== History ==
=== 2003–2010 ===
From 2003 to 2010, this was delivered as an annual report produced by the Royal Australasian Ornithologists Union (now known as BirdLife Australia) in the form of an illustrated colour magazine supplement.

The reports were published as supplements to Wingspan magazine. The 2003 and 2008 editions of SOAB were five-yearly overviews, while the other editions were themed on various aspects of Australian avifauna (for example, SOAB 2010 was themed on Birds and Islands).

=== 2015 onwards ===
The 2015 (SOAB) report launched the first Australian Bird Indices for terrestrial birds and introduces Australia's Red List Index (RLI), a means of tracking trends in the status of Australia's most threatened bird groups.

BirdLife Australia planned to release a comprehensive SOAB report in 2020, that will include indices for all of Australia's bioregions, highlight trends for a wide range of terrestrial species, and provide an evaluation of the monitoring gaps. The 2020 report also aims to incorporate information from the National Environmental Science Program Threatened Species Index project, the first iteration of which was a Threatened Bird Index, showing declines across multiple threatened bird taxa.

== Overview ==
The SOAB reports collate and analyse information on trends in the conservation status of bird populations in Australia. Some of the material presented in SOAB is extracted from BirdLife Australia's monitoring projects, notably the Atlas of Australian Birds citizen science project.

All issues are available for free download.

== List of issues ==
1. The State of Australia's Birds 2003
2. The State of Australia's Birds 2004: Water, wetlands and birds
3. The State of Australia's Birds 2005: Woodlands and Birds
4. The State of Australia's Birds 2006: Invasive Species
5. The State of Australia's Birds 2007: Birds in a Changing Climate
6. The State of Australia's Birds 2008: A Five Year Review
7. The State of Australia's Birds 2009: Restoring Woodland Habitats for Birds
8. The State of Australia's Birds 2010: Islands and Birds
9. The State of Australia's Birds 2015: Headline Trends for Terrestrial Birds
