= Lesley Brooker =

Australian ornithologist

- Occupation: CSIRO
- Known for: Ornithology

Lesley Brooker is an Australian ornithologist based in Western Australia following retirement from a career with the CSIRO's Division of Wildlife Research. There she worked, as a database manager and computer modeller, on developing methodologies for the re-design and restoration of agricultural lands for bird conservation. Since then, she has collaborated with her husband Michael Brooker in studies on cuckoo evolution, population ecology of fairy-wrens and spatial dynamics of birds in fragmented landscapes.

== Awards ==
In 2004 she was awarded the Royal Australasian Ornithologists Union's D.L. Serventy Medal which recognises excellence in published work on birds in the Australasian region.

== Career ==
Brooker has contributed to ornithological research in Australia, in various states across Australia, including Western Australia, and Queensland, as well as researching and publishing on Explorers, as well as biodiversity, for over thirty years. Her work involved research on Wedge-Tailed Eagles, Blue-breasted Fairy wrens and ecosystem connectivity. Booker was also a trip leader for the Western Australian Branch of Birdlife Australia and contributed to the Birds in the Great Western Woodlands, a joint project between BirdLife Australia and The Nature Conservancy

Brooker has also contributed to research on paternity of bird families, in Molecular Ecology.

She has published on animal dispersals, and habitat quality, on corridor use and connectivity. Brooker served on the Emu advisory committee.

== Selected works ==
- Brooker, Lesley (2002), Enhancing biodiversity values in the Latham Landcare district, CSIRO Sustainable Ecosystems
- Brooker, Lesley (2006), Explorers routes revisted: Expedition eastward from Northam by the Dempster brothers, Clarkson, Harper and Correll, July–August 1861, Hesperian Press, ISBN 978-0-85905-390-7
- Brooker, Lesley (2012), Explorers routes revisited: Moore expeditions 1836; Drummond expeditions 1841–1842, Hesperian Press, ISBN 978-0-85905-516-1
- Brooker, Lesley (2012), Explorers routes revisited: Roe expedition 1836, Hesperian Press, ISBN 978-0-85905-504-8
- Brooker, Lesley (2015), Explorers routes revisited: Giles 1875 expedition, Hesperian Press, ISBN 978-0-85905-612-0
