= Richard Holdaway (biologist) =

New Zealand ornithologist

Richard Noel Holdaway is a New Zealand ornithologist. With a doctorate in avian palaeobiology and systematics and a BSc in neurophysiology and ornithology, he has studied birds for three decades primarily in New Zealand. In 2003 he received (together with Trevor Worthy) the 2003 D. L. Serventy Medal Holdaway is director (and owner) of Palaecol Research Ltd in Christchurch, New Zealand. He was recognized for his findings (together with Chris Jacomb) on the extinction of the New Zealand terrestrial megafauna by the University of Otago. His work has also appeared in the New Zealand Journal of Zoology, Nature Communications, the US National Library of Medicine, National Institutes of Health and Royal Society Publishing among others.
