= William Frith =

William Frith may refer to:

- William Powell Frith (1819–1909), English artist
- William Silver Frith (1850–1924), English sculptor
- William Frith (politician) (1883–1960), Australian politician
- William Frith (English cricketer) (1871–1956), English cricketer
- William Frith (New Zealand cricketer) (1856–1949), New Zealand cricketer
- Billy Frith (1912–1996), English football player and manager

== See also ==
- Frith (disambiguation)
