= Michael Clarke (ornithologist) =

Australian ornithologist

Michael Clarke is an Australian ornithologist. He is an Emeritus Professor at La Trobe University in Melbourne, Victoria, where he has worked since 1992. He is especially known for his research into the evolution of cooperative breeding in honeyeaters, particularly the genus Manorina and for his work on the response of fauna and flora to wildfire. In 2007, he was the recipient of the D. L. Serventy Medal, awarded by the Royal Australasian Ornithologists Union for outstanding published work on birds in the Australasian region. In 2023, he became a fellow of Birdlife Australia.

== Select Bibliography ==
- Clarke, Michael F. (2008). "Catering for the needs of fauna in fire management: science or just wishful thinking?". Wildlife Research. 35 (5): 385–394. doi:10.1071/WR07137.
- Clarke, Michael F.; Avitabile, Sarah C.; Brown, Lauren; Callister, Kate E.; Haslem, Angie; Holland, Greg J.; Kelly, Luke T.; Kenny, Sally A.; Nimmo, Dale G.; Spence-Bailey, Lisa M.; Taylor, Rick S.; Watson, Simon J.; Bennett, Andrew F. (2010). "Ageing mallee eucalypt vegetation after fire: insights for successional trajectories in semi-arid mallee ecosystems". Australian Journal of Botany. 58 (5): 363–372. doi:10.1071/BT10051. ISSN 0067-1924.
- Clarke, Michael (3 February 2020). "Pardon me for getting "religious" about climate change". ABC Religion & Ethics.
