= List of BioBlitzes in New Zealand =

This is a list of BioBlitzes that have been held in New Zealand. The date is the first day of the BioBlitz if held over several days. This list only includes those that were major public events. BioBlitz was established in New Zealand by Manaaki Whenua - Landcare Research initially based on seed funding from The Royal Society of NZ's "Science & Technology Promotion Fund 2003/2004". BioBlitz events have always been a collaborative activity of professional and amateur taxonomic experts from multiple organisations and the public. Auckland BioBlitz events were coordinated by Manaaki Whenua, later from 2015 moving to events coordinated by Auckland Museum. The first events were 24 hours continuously, e.g. from 3 pm Friday overnight to 3 pm Saturday. Subsequently, this changed to 24 hours spread across mostly daylight hours over 2 consecutive days.

| Date | Location | Species Recorded | Ecosystem | Reference |
|---|---|---|---|---|
| 30 Apr 2004 | Auckland, Dingle Dell and Meadowbank School, St Heliers (with base camp at Vellenoweth Green, St Heliers) | 1556 | Urban Park and Primary School | |
| 12 Mar 2005 | Auckland, Auckland Domain | 1779 | Urban Park | |
| 8 Apr 2005 | Christchurch, Christchurch Botanic Gardens and Hagley Park | 1197 | Urban Park | |
| 24 Mar 2006 | Auckland, Opanuku Stream, Henderson (with base camp at Corban Estate Arts Centre) | 1262 | Urban Park | |
| 4 Apr 2008 | Auckland, Smith's Bush, Northcote | 946 | Urban Park | |
| 17 Apr 2010 | Auckland, Auckland Domain | 1775 | Urban Park | |
| 2 Mar 2012 | Westland, Denniston Plateau, vic Westport | | Conservation Reserve | |
| 30 Mar 2012 | Auckland, Auckland Regional Botanic Gardens and Totara Park | | Urban Park | |
| 28 Feb 2013 | Auckland, Pūkorokoro / Miranda | | Coastal | |
| 6 Mar 2015 | Bay of Plenty, Uretara Catchment, Katikati | | Catchment | |
| 27 Mar 2015 | Auckland, Pourewa Reserve / Kepa Bush | 1003 | Urban Park | |
| 29 Jul 2015 | Auckland, Kurt Brehmer Walkway, Te Whau River | | Urban Park | |
| 24 Mar 2017 | Auckland, Opunaku Stream, Henderson | | Urban Park | |
| 7 Apr 2017 | Canterbury, Lincoln, Liffey Stream | | Urban Park | |
| 27 Oct 2017 | Auckland, Whatipu | | Coastal | |
| 16 Feb 2018 | Waikato, Lake Rotopiko, vic. Te Awamutu, Waikato | | Wetland | |
| 25 Mar 2018 | Northland, Kapowairua | | Coastal | |
