= Breeding bird survey =

A breeding bird survey monitors the status and trends of bird populations. Data from the survey are an important source for the range maps found in field guides. The North American Breeding Bird Survey is a joint project of the United States Geological Survey (USGS) and the Canadian Wildlife Service. The UK Breeding Bird Survey is administered by the British Trust for Ornithology, the Joint Nature Conservation Committee, and the Royal Society for the Protection of Birds.

The results of the BBS are valuable in evaluating the increasing and decreasing range of bird population which can be a key point to bird conservation. The BBS was designed to provide a continent-wide perspective of population change.

== History ==
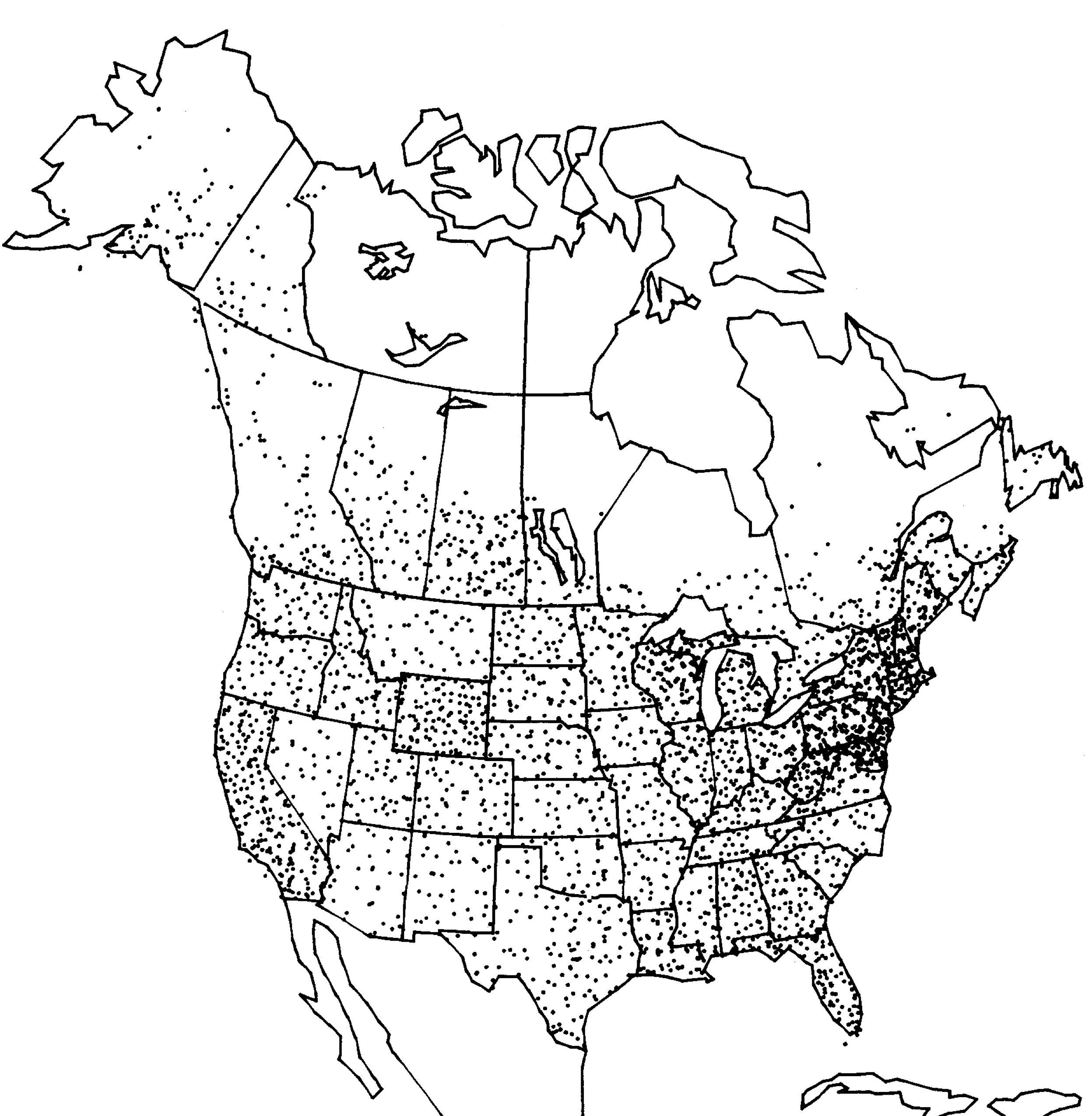
BBS routes in the U.S. and Canada, as of 1990

The North American Breeding Bird Survey was launched in 1966 after the concept of a continental monitoring program for all breeding birds had been developed by Chandler Robbins and his associates from the Migratory Bird Population Station. The program was developed in Laurel, Maryland. In the first year of its existence there were nearly 600 surveys conducted east of the Mississippi River. One year later, in 1967, the survey spread to the Great Plains states and by 1968 almost 2000 routes had been established across southern Canada and 48 American states. As more birders were introduced to this program, the number of active BBS routes continued to increase. In the 1980s, the Breeding Bird Survey included Yukon, Northwest Territories of Canada and Alaska. Additionally, the number of routes in established states has increased. Currently, there are approximately 3700 active BBS routes in the United States and Canada, of which approximately 2900 are surveyed on an annual basis. The density of the routes varies greatly across the continent and the largest number of routes can be found in New England and Mid-Atlantic states. Many bird watchers participate in these surveys as they find the experience rewarding. Future plans for the BBS include expanding coverage in central and western North America, and adding routes in northern Mexico.

The surveys conducted by BBS take place during the peak of the nesting season; usually June, but also May in regions with warmer temperatures. A typical BBS route is 24.5 miles long with a stop every 0.5 miles, adding up to 50 stops per route. Routes are randomly located in order to sample habitats that are representative of the entire region.

BBS data is quite difficult to analyze given that the survey does not produce a complete counting of the breeding bird populations but more like a relative abundance index. Even so, these surveys have proved to be of great value in studying bird population trends.

BBS data can also be used to produce continental-scale relative abundance maps. When analyzed at larger scales, the relative abundance maps can offer a clear indication of the status and distribution of bird species that are observed by the BBS. However, the most effective use of these surveys is the opportunity to analyze population trends, though information on the factors that cause these changes cannot be determined.

The BTO/JNCC/RSPB Breeding Bird Survey (BBS) is a national project aimed at keeping track of changes in the breeding populations of widespread bird species in the UK. The program started in 1992, and has been successfully used by Governments and different non-Governmental organizations for bird conservation purposes since 1994. The RSPB BBS coordinates over 3200 active routes, with more than 3000 birders involved in monitoring the population trends of more than 100 bird species.

== See also ==
- Australian Bird Count (ABC)
- BioBlitz ("24-hour inventory")
- Pilling's Pond
- Breeding in the wild
- Christmas Bird Count (CBC) (in the Western Hemisphere)
- Seabird Colony Register (SCR)
- The EBCC Atlas of European Breeding Birds
- Tucson Bird Count (TBC) (in Arizona in the US)
- the World Series of Birding in New Jersey (a 24-hour state inventory teams race)
