= Hugh Forde =

Hugh Forde may refer to:

- Hugh Forde (boxer) (born 1964), English boxer of the 1980s and 1990s
- Hugh Forde (footballer) (born 1936), Northern Irish footballer

== See also ==
- Hugh Ford (disambiguation)
