= Oliver Michael Griffiths Newman =

Oliver Michael Griffiths Newman (born 1941) is an Australian metallurgist, administrator and amateur ornithologist who has worked for many years with Pasminco EZ Ltd in Tasmania and Newcastle, New South Wales. In Tasmania he was involved with studies on waders, especially the breeding biology of pied oystercatchers. He became a member of the Royal Australasian Ornithologists Union (RAOU) in 1968. He was regional organizer for the RAOU's Atlas of Australian Birds project 1977–1981. He served on the RAOU Council 1982–1988, and again from 1999, including chairing the Research Committee. He was elected a Fellow of the RAOU in 2003.

== See also ==
- List of ornithologists
