= Michael Brooker =

Australian ornithologist

Michael Brooker is an Australian ornithologist based in Western Australia following retirement from a career with the CSIRO's Division of Wildlife Research. There he worked on wedge-tailed eagles, fauna surveys, the environmental impact of wildfire and the conservation value of remnant patches of native vegetation. Since then he has collaborated with his wife Lesley Brooker in studies on cuckoo evolution, population ecology of fairy-wrens and spatial dynamics of birds in fragmented landscapes. In 2004 he was awarded, jointly with his wife Lesley, the Royal Australasian Ornithologists Union's D.L. Serventy Medal which recognizes excellence in published work on birds in the Australasian region.
