= Atlas of Victorian Birds =

- Author: W.B. Emison, C.M. Beardsell, F.I. Norman, R.H. Loyn, Simon Bennett.
- Cover artist: Jeff Davies
- Language: English
- Subject: Ornithology
- Genre: Biological atlas
- Publisher: Dept of Conservation, Forest and Lands, Victoria; and Royal Australasian Ornithologists Union
- Publication date: 1987
- Publication place: Australia
- Media type: Paperback
- Pages: 272
- ISBN: 0-7241-8387-6
- OCLC: 27556991

The Atlas of Victorian Birds is a bird atlas, published in 1987, covering the distribution of birds in the Australian state of Victoria. It is based largely on 615,000 field records of birds in Victoria from the Atlas of Australian Birds database, gathered by volunteers in the course of the Royal Australasian Ornithologists Union’s atlas project from 1977 to 1981, as well as an additional 65,000 records gathered by officers of the National Parks and Wildlife Service of Victoria from 1973 to 1986.

== Layout ==
The book is a quarto-sized, 272 page paperback, 295 mm in height by 210 mm wide. The first 28 pages contain a list of contents and an introductory section explaining the scope and methodology of the atlas, including sections on Victoria’s environment and physiographic regions. The following 244 pages are largely devoted to the accounts of about 480 species, mostly with maps showing both general and breeding distribution, a graph of the monthly recording index, a table showing breeding by month, and a brief text summary of each species’ biology and ecology in the state.
