= Frith (disambiguation) =

Frith is an obsolete English word meaning peace or refuge.

Frith may also refer to:

- Frith (surname)
- Frith Street, London
- Frith van der Merwe (born 1964), South African athlete
- The Frith, an Iron Age hillfort near Silchester, Hampshire, England
- a town in Montserrat
- Frith, the Sun-god in the legends of the rabbits of Watership Down
