= Geological Conservation Review =

Database of UK geological and geomorphological heritage

The Geological Conservation Review (GCR) is produced by the UK's Joint Nature Conservation Committee. It is designed to identify those sites of national and international importance needed to show all the key scientific elements of the geological and geomorphological features of Britain. These sites display sediments, rocks, minerals, fossils, and features of the landscape that make a special contribution to an understanding and appreciation of Earth science and the geological history of Britain, which stretches back more than three billion years. The intention of the project, which was devised in 1974 by George Black and William Wimbledon working for the Governmental advisory agency, the Nature Conservancy Council (NCC), was activated in 1977. It aimed to provide the scientific rationale and information base for the conservation of geological SSSIs (Sites of Special Scientific Interest, protected under British law (latterly the Wildlife and Countryside Act 1981, as amended 1995). The NCC and country conservation agencies were established in 1990 when JNCC became established (Environmental Protection Act 1990) and took over responsibility for managing the GCR site assessment process, and publishing accounts of accepted sites.

By 2000, over 3000 localities had been identified as qualifying for GCR standard (SSSI standard). NCC and later JNCC, have published detailed site descriptions of the GCR localities. For part of the GCR Series of books, commercial publishers were involved, principally Chapman & Hall. As of 2010, 36 of the planned 45 volumes had been published, with volumes 15 to 36 published by JNCC directly, and available for sale through the Natural History Book Service, Totnes.
