= BioBlitz =

Biological surveying event

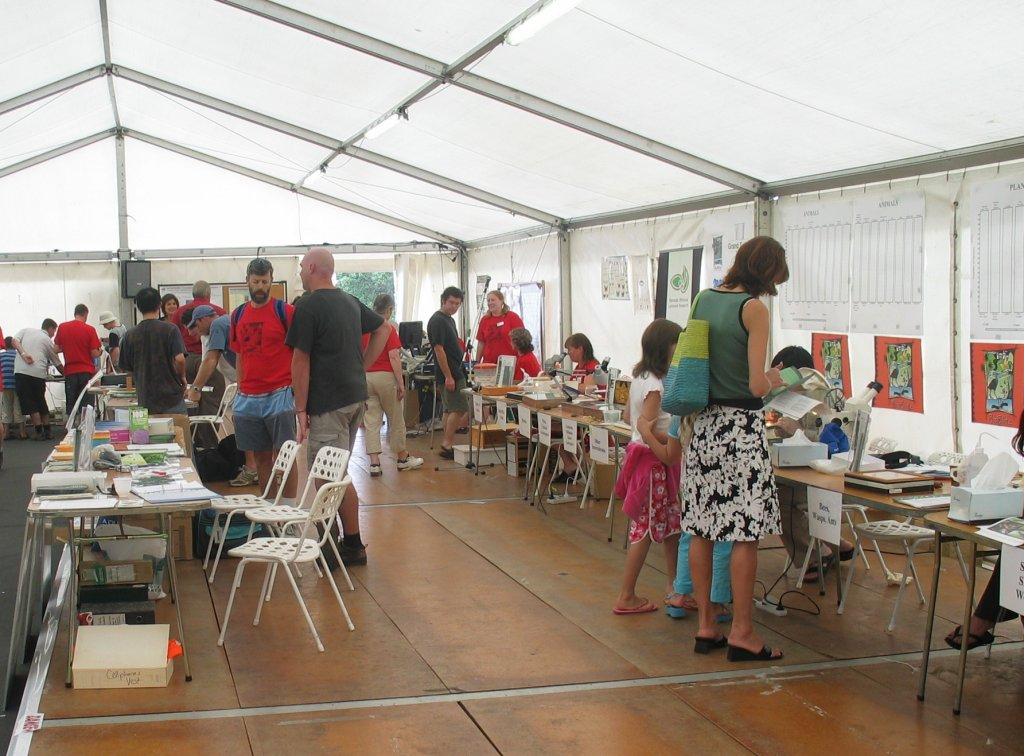
Base camp at a BioBlitz in Auckland, New Zealand

A BioBlitz, also written without capitals as bioblitz, is an intense period of biological surveying in an attempt to record all the living species within a designated area. Groups of scientists, naturalists, and volunteers conduct an intensive field study over a continuous time period (e.g., usually 24 hours). There is a public component to many BioBlitzes, with the goal of getting the public interested in biodiversity. To encourage more public participation, these BioBlitzes are often held in urban parks or nature reserves close to cities. Research into the best practices for a successful BioBlitz has found that collaboration with local natural history museums can improve public participation. As well, BioBlitzes have been shown to be a successful tool in teaching post-secondary students about biodiversity.

== Features ==
A BioBlitz has different opportunities and benefits than a traditional, scientific field study. Some of these potential benefits include:

- Enjoyment – Instead of a highly structured and measured field survey, this sort of event has the atmosphere of a festival. The short time frame makes the search more exciting.
- Local – The concept of biodiversity tends to be associated with coral reefs or tropical rainforests. A BioBlitz offers the chance for people to visit a nearby setting and see that local parks have biodiversity and are important to conserve.
- Science – These one-day events gather basic taxonomic information on some groups of species.
- Meet the Scientists – A BioBlitz encourages people to meet working scientists and ask them questions.
- Identifying rare and unique species/groups – When volunteers and scientists work together, they are able to identify uncommon or special habitats for protection and management and, in some cases, rare species may be uncovered.
- Documenting species occurrence – BioBlitzes do not provide a complete species inventory for a site, but they provide a species list which makes a basis for a more complete inventory and will often show what area or what taxon would benefit from a further study.
- Increases interest in science – BioBlitzes helps to build interest from the general public in science and environmental studies by enabling direct communication and inclusive activities.

== History ==
The term "BioBlitz" was first coined by U.S. National Park Service naturalist Susan Rudy while assisting with the first BioBlitz. The first BioBlitz was held at Kenilworth Aquatic Gardens, Washington, D.C. in 1996. Approximately 1000 species were identified at this first event. This first accounting of biodiversity was organized by Sam Droege (USGS) and Dan Roddy (NPS) with the assistance of other government scientists. The public and especially the news media were invited. Since the success of the first bioblitz, many organizations around the world have repeated this concept.

Since then, most BioBlitz contain a public component so that adults, kids, teens and anyone interested can join experts and scientists in the field. Participating in these hands-on field studies is a fun and exciting way for people to learn about biodiversity and better understand how to protect it.

In 1998, Harvard biologist E.O. Wilson and Massachusetts wildlife expert Peter Alden developed a program to catalog the organisms around Walden Pond. This led to a statewide program known as Biodiversity Days. This concept is very similar to a BioBlitz and occasionally the two terms are used interchangeably.

A variation on the BioBlitz, the Blogger Blitz began in 2007. Rather than gather volunteers and scientists at one location, participant blogs pledged to conduct individual surveys of biodiversity. These results were then compiled and mapped. The purpose of this blitz is not to survey down to species level across all taxonomic groups, but rather to raise awareness about biodiversity and provide a general snapshot of diversity.

From 2007 through 2016 National Geographic Society and the US National Park Service partnered to put on a Bioblitz in a different National Park each year culminating in a Bioblitz across the National Park Service in 2016 as part of the National Park Service Centennial Celebration. The iNaturalist platform was used as the recording tool for the 2014, 2015, and 2016 Centennial Bioblitzes in this series.

Highlights of the 2016 nationwide BioBlitz include:

- The National Parks BioBlitz—Washington, D.C. was the cornerstone of the national event. Nearly 300 scientists and experts led more than 2,600 students and thousands of members of the general public in all 13 of the National Capital Region's parks. As of the closing ceremony on 21 May, nearly 900 species were recorded from this area alone.
- The Biodiversity Festival at Constitution Gardens on the National Mall served as a window to events across the country, with regular live feeds featuring species discoveries on jumbo screens located on the National Mall.
- E. O. Wilson, "father of biodiversity", was a significant part of the pre-BioBlitz events, including the Special Speaker Series at the American Association for the Advancement of Science and the 2016 National Parks BioBlitz Scientist Dinner at National Geographic Headquarters on Thursday, 19 May.
- The BioBlitz Dance was a common activity throughout the festival weekend. Participants danced with John Griffith, founder of the dance, on the main stage several times at Constitution Gardens, and on the jumbotron from other park units across the nation.
- National parks and participating partners shared their BioBlitz activities via social media, using the hashtags #BioBlitz2016 and #FindYourPark. During the weekend's event, #BioBlitz2016 ranked in the top 10 on Twitter!
- At Cabrillo National Monument, Green Abalone (Haliotis fulgens) was documented. For the past thirty years, abalone have faced substantial conservation concerns due to overharvesting and disease. Their presence in the Cabrillo Rocky Intertidal Zone can be described as ephemeral at best.
- Knife River National Park conducted an ArcheoBlitz. A centuries-old bison tooth was found at Big Hidatsa Village, which was occupied from about 1740 to 1850. DNA extracted from this tooth can provide data on bison populations before their near-extinction at the end of the 19th century, a useful comparison for managers of modern herds.
- At Great Smoky Mountain National Park, experts teamed up with about 100 5th graders. Together they set out to explore pollinators and succeeded in discovering nearly 200 species. While it is too early to tell if they found any new species, they have added significant information to the park's database.
- Craters of the Moon National Monument and Preserve conducted a lichen survey and added several new species to their park list. One of those identified is Xanthoria elegans. This species of lichen survived an 18-month exposure to solar UV radiation, cosmic rays, vacuum and varying temperatures in an experiment performed by the ESA outside of the ISS.
- Channel Islands National Park broadcast a dive with oceanographer and National Geographic Explorer, Dr. Sylvia Earle, with support from the National Park Trust. The feed was featured online and on the jumbotrons on the National Mall and enabled the public to follow the exploration of one of the richest marine ecosystems in the world, the giant kelp forest.
- The National Parks BioBlitz used the iNaturalist app to deliver real-time information on species finds. Verified data will be included in National Park Service databases and international databases tracking biodiversity on the planet. This application can be used by parks and citizen scientists well into the future.
- Beginning with the 2010 NPS/NGS BioBlitz at Biscayne National Park, NPS initiated a corps of Biodiversity Youth Ambassadors. Each year through 2016, a student ambassador is selected by the host park to participate in the BioBlitz and assist in raising biodiversity awareness to their peers and in their home communities. In addition to the new NCR Biodiversity Youth Ambassador, Ms. Katherine Hagan, Ms. Mikaila Ulmer, 11, was selected to be the National Park Service Biodiversity Youth Ambassador representing the President's Pollinator Conservation Initiative for the National Park Service.

== BioBlitzes by country ==
=== Australia ===
- The Woodland Watch Project (part of the World Wide Fund for Nature) (WWF) has organised BioBlitz's in the wheatbelt area of Western Australia in 2002, 2003, 2004, 2006, 2008, 2009 and 2010.
- Two 'SpiderBlitz's' (variants of the BioBlitz concept) were organised in 2007 and 2008 in the wheatbelt by WWF to focus attention on threatened trapdoor spiders, and their unique habitats.
- Wheatbelt Natural Resource Management Wheatbelt NRM ran a BioBlitz around the wheatbelt town of Korrelocking in 2012.
- The Discovery Circle program (UniSA) ran two BioBlitzes at a park in Salisbury and wetlands at Marion, South Australia.
- The Atlas of Life in the Coastal Wilderness www.alcw.org.au has run three successful bioblitzes – in Bermagui 2012, Pambula 2014 and Mimosa Rocks National Park 2014. The Atlas of Life works in association with the Atlas of Living Australia (the national biodiversity database)
- takayna BioBlitz The Bob Brown Foundation runs an annual takayna BioBlitz in Tasmania, Australia. The takayna BioBlitz is a festival of science in nature, held in one of the world's last truly wild places. This event brings together scientists, experts, naturalists and members of the public for a weekend of environmental scientific discovery. See: bobbrown.org.au
- Tarkine BioBlitz, 19–22 November 2015, was the first BioBlitz in Tasmania. More than 100 people surveyed moorland, rainforest, rivers and coastline in the remote Tarkine region in support of the Bob Brown Foundation's campaign for a Tarkine National Park to protect the natural values of the region.
- Melbourne City Council conducted a BioBlitz in 2014 and 2016, engaging citizens in nature conservation in cities .

=== Canada ===
Active Bioblitz

- The Robert Bateman Get to Know BioBlitz started in 2010 to celebrate the international year of biodiversity. In a partnership with Parks Canada there were many sites all across Canada which celebrated bioblitzes on the international day of biodiversity (22 May).
- British Columbia
  - There has been an annual BioBlitz in Whistler, BC since 2007. The 2013 BioBlitz reported 497 species.
  - Metro Vancouver has hosted their annual BioBlitz at Burnaby Lake Regional Park since 2010. This bioblitz has much public participation with many activities including pond-dipping, nature walks and meeting live animals up close. The species count currently stands at 488, including a Western Screech Owl, Red-legged Frog, Brassy Minnows and Common Fern which, despite its name, had never been found in the area before.
- Ontario:
  - The Royal Ontario Museum and several other organizations have sponsored BioBlitz in the Toronto area since 2012, with the 2015 event scheduled for the Don River watershed. The 2014 Humber BioBlitz had over 500 participants and counted 1,560 species, including 2 spiders that were new to Canada.
  - The Rouge National Urban Park hosted a Bioblitz event on 24 and 25 June 2017. The previous Bioblitz at the park was held in 2013 where over 1700 species of flora and fauna were identified.
- New Brunswick:
  - The New Brunswick Museum has held an annual bioblitz since 2009 in Protected Natural Areas (PNA) around the province. Scientists spend two weeks each year in the field, alternating June in one year with August in the next to catch seasonally available biodiversity. The bioblitz was held in Jacquet River Gorge PNA 2009–2010, Caldonia Gorge PNA in 2011–2012, Grand Lake PNA in 2013–2014, Nepisiguit PNA in 2015–2016, and Spednic Lake PNA in 2017–2018. More information is here. The 2013-2014 bioblitzes were the subject of a documentary

Inactive and historic BioBlitz

- The Canadian Biodiversity Institute held numerous BioBlitzes between 1997 and 2001.
- Victoria's Beacon Hill has had two BioBlitzes, in April 2007 and October 2007. They successfully gave thanks for the biodiversity of the region. Beacon Hill has since been a site for Arborblitzs, which focus on identifying all the trees within the park.
- Saint Mary's University (Halifax) held BioBlitz in Nova Scotia between 2008 and 2010 with the report on the 2010 BioBlitz available here.
- The Warren Lake BioBlitz was scheduled for 11–13 August 2011. Warren Lake is on the east side of Cape Breton Highlands National Park. There is a hiking trail which circumnavigates the lake and it will be considered the border of the BioBlitz, i.e., there will be quite an extensive aquatic focus.
- Stanley Park in Vancouver held BioBlitz between 2011 and 2013.
- Harrison Hot Springs had a BioBlitz in July 2011 to highlight the biodiversity of species in the Fraser Valley.

=== Hong Kong ===
- In Traditional Chinese this has been referred to as: 生態速查 (Ecological quick check).
- First HK's BioBlitz was organized by Tai Tam Tuk Foundation from 24 to 25 Oct 2015. 50 experts leading 300 secondary students recorded more than 680 species in 30 hours, covering marine, terrestrial and intertidal habitats, in Tai Tam site of special scientific interest (SSSI). This event comes as part of the ‘Biodiversity Festival 2015’, an Agriculture, Fisheries and Conservation Department (AFCD) lead project that encompasses many events, exhibitions and seminars, and is a major section of Hong Kong's Biodiversity Strategy and Action Plan (BSAP). Highlights included 2 species of moth that are extremely rare and native to Hong Kong, the first official record of coral in Tai Tam Bay and the first official record of juvenile horseshoe crabs on Hong Kong island. Data are made available through an online platform iSpot.
- BioBlitz@CityU is a competition in the small wooded park on university campus organized by City University of Hong Kong on 4 March 2016.
- On 21–22 Oct 2017, Lung Fu Shan Environmental Education Centre organized their first BioBlitz. This center was jointly established by the Environmental Protection Department of HK Government and The University of Hong Kong in 2008. 100 participants and volunteers found 151 species in Lung Fu Shan with the guidance of 11 experts within 24 hours. In 2018 this was expanded to separate bioblitz surveys into four animal groups: Birds; Butterflies, (other) Insects, and Amphibians and Reptiles. And in 2019 another bioblitz is planned.
- Tai Tam Tuk Foundation organized their second BioBlitz on 3–4 Nov 2017. They translated the iNaturalist app and slideshow into Chinese with the help of Hong Kong Explorers Initiative and the technical support of Scott Loarie and Alex Shepard from iNaturalist.org for better data collection among local participants. Also, they organized the pilot self-guided activity "DIY BioBlitz" with the help of Environmental Life Science Society, HKU and the teacher training in this event. Data are made available: https://www.inaturalist.org/projects/hk-bioblitz-2017 This event is subvented by Agriculture, Fisheries and Conservation Department of HK Government.
- In January 2019 the Hong Kong BioBlitz @ Hong Kong Park was carried out in Kong Kong Park. Utilizing iNaturalist and experts from the Natural History Museum, London, and Tai Tam Tuk Eco Education Centre.
- With popularity of City Nature Challenge in Hong Kong since its first participation in 2018, bioblitzes have increasingly been combined with this and other iNaturalist based challenges such as the Hong Kong Inter-School City Nature Challenge.

=== Hungary ===
BioBlitz Events in Hungary are organized by the Hungarian Biodiversity Research Society http://www.biodiverzitasnap.hu/ since 2006, starting with the eco-village Gyürüfű and its surroundings in Baranya County. Since then the Society organizes BioBlitz Events (called also Biodiversity Days) every year, sometimes even several events a year, during which 60-80 experts and researchers contribute to a profound momentary inventory of a chosen area in Hungary, and from time to time in cross-border areas in joint-projects with neighbour countries. The Hungarian Biodiversity Research Society invites local inhabitants and the interested public to join their events, and focusses in its outreach to young local and regional pupils and their teachers just like students from Hungary and abroad. The BioBlitz Events are taking place in partnership with the local National Park Directories, Municipalities and Civil Organisations. A rather fresh approach is the involvement of high school students during their obligatory community/voluntary work into research and field work in the topics of biodiversity and nature protection based upon long term co-operation contracts with schools and educational centres. The main goals pursued by the Hungarian Biodiversity Research Society are to promote the correct understanding of biodiversity in its true context, based upon data collection, monitoring, research and expertise, passing on knowledge from generation to generation and outreach to the broader public. It also aims to strengthen national and international networks. The results of the BioBlitz Events are published in print and on-line media and serve mainly as fundamentals for maintenance-instructions for protected areas and for appropriate natural-resource management, but also for educational purposes.

=== India ===
On 20 May 2025, the first BioBlitz event took place in Odisha at Nandankanan Wildlife Sanctuary, Bhubaneswar. More than 400 species of various taxa have been documented during the 24 hours of rigorous survey. A total of 50 participants of 30 institutions/organizations have participated in the event.

=== Ireland ===
- An Ireland's BioBlitz Event has been held annually since 2010 – established by the National Biodiversity Data Centre http://www.biodiversityireland.ie/ to celebrate International Year of Biodiversity. A unique feature of this event is that it has a number of parks through the island competing against each other to see which site records the most species over a 24hr period. The event is usually held on the third weekend in May each year.
- In 2010, the first year it was held, Connemara National Park won the competition having recording 542 species. In 2011, Killareny National Park won the event having recorded an astonishing tally of 1088 species. Crawfordsburn Country Park won in 2012 having recorded 984 species. All of the data are made available through an online mapping system, Biodiversity Maps http://maps.biodiversityireland.ie/# and hard copy species lists are produced http://bioblitz.biodiversityireland.ie/bioblitz-species-lists-now-available/
- The event is co-ordinated by the National Biodiversity Data Centre who maintain a special website http://bioblitz.biodiversityireland.ie/ each year so that progress with the event can be tracked on-line.
- To cater for the success of BioBlitz in Ireland, support is provided for a special 'Local BioBlitz Challenge' for local sites. Also, on 14–15 June 2013 Limerick City hosts the first Urban BioBlitz in Ireland.
- On 1 May 2014, the first Intervarsity BioBlitz was held with support from the National Biodiversity Data Centre. University College Cork, National University of Ireland Galway, Trinity, Dublin City University and Dundalk IT all competed to count Biodiversity on campus, with NUIG being the inaugural winner.

=== Israel ===
- On 24 April 2014, the first BioBlitz in Israel took place in Yeruham lake park. The event was supported by Ben Gurion University of the Negev. 531 different species were found. A second Bioblitz is scheduled to take place on 26 March 2015.

=== Malaysia ===
- Since 2011 the Malaysian Nature Society has held an annual birdwatching bioblitz named "MY Garden Birdwatch".

=== México ===
- Since 2019 the Rancho Komchén de los Pájaros has held an annual bioblitz. Check out the iNaturalist results

=== New Zealand ===
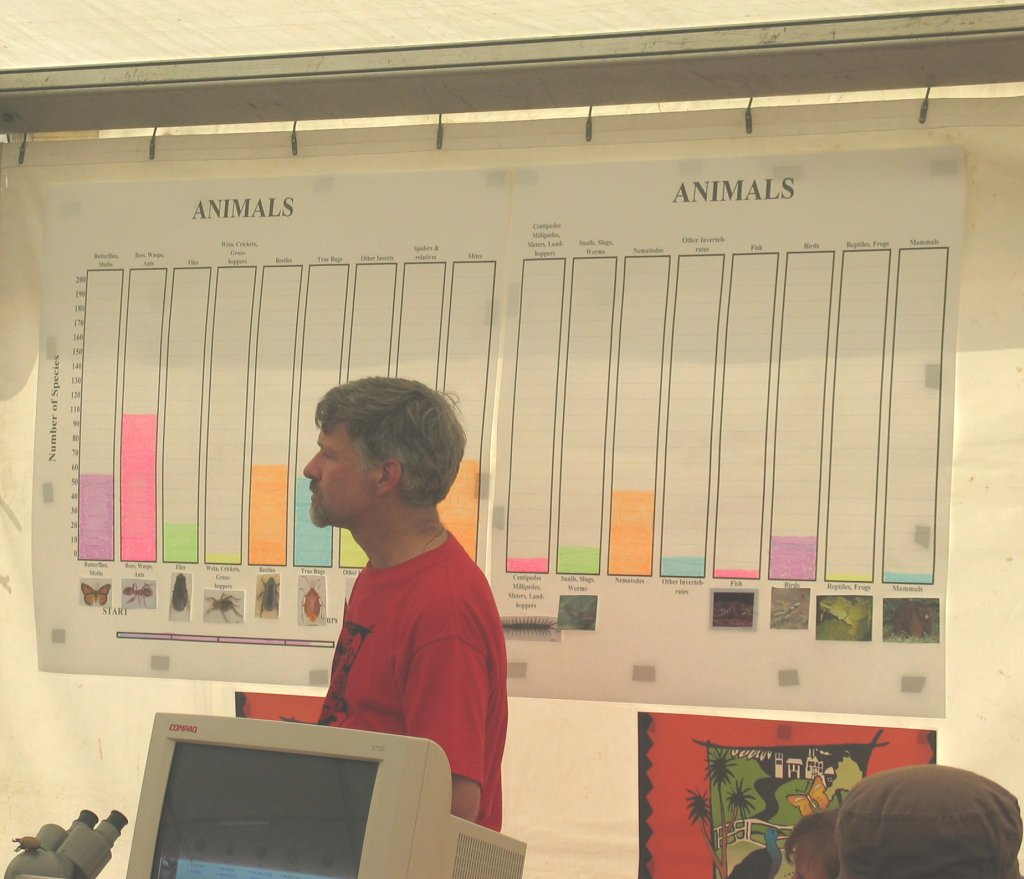
Peter Buchanan, the organiser of the 2004–2008 Auckland BioBlitzes

- Landcare Research, in conjunction with colleagues in other institutes and agencies, held BioBlitzes in Auckland in 2004, 2005, 2006, and 2008; and in Christchurch in 2005. A BioBlitz was planned for early April 2009 in Christchurch. Other New Zealand BioBlitzes have been held in Hamilton and in Wellington.
- The first marine BioBlitz occurred on the Wellington South Coast over a month, since a marine BioBlitz is trickier weatherwise than a terrestrial one.
- In March 2012 Forest and Bird organised a BioBlitz on the Denniston Plateau on the West Coast of the South Island. It is the site of the proposed Escarpment Mine Project.
- See a List of BioBlitzes in New Zealand.

=== Pakistan ===
- The first BioBlitz in Pakistan was organized at Hazarganji Chiltan National Park on 15 April 2023, by The First Steps School.

=== Poland ===
- The first BioBlitz in Poland was organized in Sopot in May 2008 by the Polish Scientific Committee on Oceanic Research of the Polish Academy of Sciences.

=== Portugal ===
- Faro was the first city in Portugal to have a BioBlitz, in October 2009.

=== Singapore ===
- The Singapore National Parks (NParks) Community in Nature (CIN) program have been running BioBlitz in various parks and gardens across Singapore to coincide with the International Day for Biological Diversity.

=== Slovenia ===
- Slovene's first BioBlitz took place on 19/20 May 2017, in Draga (in central Slovenia). The event was conducted during the project "Invazivke nikoli ne počivajo: Ozaveščanje o in preprečevanje negativnega vpliva invazivnih vrst na evropsko ogrožene vrste" and supported by the Slovene Ministry of the Environment and Spatial Planning. The event was held in cooperation with Societas herpetologica slovenica, the Botanical Society of Slovenia, the Centre for Cartography of Fauna and Flora, and the Slovene Dragonfly Society. During the event, 124 experts participated and 1,588 different species were found.
- BioBlitz Slovenia 2018 was held in Rače (in northeastern Slovenia) on 15/16 June. Altogether, 71 experts from 21 different organisations participated, and at the end of the 24-hour event 934 species or higher taxon were identified. BioBlitz Slovenia 2018 was organised by four NGOs: Societas herpetologica slovenica, the Slovene Dragonfly Society, the Botanical Society of Slovenia, and the Centre for Cartography of Fauna and Flora.
- A third BioBlitz Slovenia took place on 17/18 May 2019, in the Lož Karst Field. As a part of the project "Še smo tu – domorodne vrste še nismo izrinjene", it was supported by the Slovene Ministry of the Environment and Spatial Planning. Eighty experts participated and 899 different species were found. BioBlitz Slovenia 2019 was organised by three NGOs: Societas herpetologica slovenica, the Slovene Dragonfly Society, and the Centre for Cartography of Fauna and Flora.

The results of the events are published in print and on-line media and journals, also together with the list of species. BioBlitz Slovenia became a traditional annual event and has its own webpage.

=== Spain ===
- In Formentera (Balearic Islands), during the Posidonia Festival 2008, there was a bioblitz.
- Barcelona (Catalonia) hosts a BioBlitz yearly since 2010, organized by Barcelona City Council, University of Barcelona and Natural History Museum of Barcelona, in collaboration with several naturalist and scientific societies. First BioBlitzBcn was held in June 2010 at Laberint d'Horta and Parc de la Ciutadella. Second in October 2011 at Jardí Botànic de Barcelona. Third in May 2012 at Jardí Botànic Històric.
- The university of Almeria organizes the AmBioBlitz in April yearly since 2018, with the collaboration of CECOUAL (Centre of Scientific Collections of the University of Almería) and Observation.org
- The Pablo de Olavide University, from Seville, will host in April 2021 its first BioBlitz in collaboration with Observation.org and Biological Station of Doñana-CSIC

=== Sweden ===
- Sweden's first BioBlitz was organized in Röttle (Gränna) on 4 and 5 August 2012.
- On 7 and 8 September 2012 a BioBlitz was organized in Fliseryd near the river Emån. A total of 345 species were reported in this former industrial site on islands in the river.
- Sweden's fourth BioBlitz will be organized in Högsby on 5 and 6 June 2014.

=== Taiwan ===
- Taipei 228 Peace Park 2008 BioBlitz on 20 December, sponsored by Taiwan Forestry Bureau and National Taiwan Museum, found more than 180 plants, 11 birds and 1 mammal.

=== Trinidad & Tobago ===
- Tucker Valley Bioblitz 2012 was the first bioblitz in Trinidad and possibly the Caribbean. It was organised by Mike G. Rutherford, curator of the University of the West Indies Zoology Museum (UWIZM) with help from the Trinidad and Tobago Field Naturalists' Club (TTFNC) and was sponsored by First Citizens Bank. The 24-hour event found 654 species – 211 plants and 443 animals.
- Arima Valley Bioblitz 2013 was based at the Asa Wright Nature Centre. The event found 139 vertebrates, 247 invertebrates, 30 fungi, 7 diatoms and 317 plants making a total of 740 species.
- Nariva Swamp Bioblitz 2014 was based at the Forestry Division Field Station near Bush Bush Forest Reserve, the teams found 742 species.
- Charlotteville Bioblitz 2015 was the first event to take place in Tobago. Based at the Environmental Research Institute Charlotteville (ERIC) there was a large marine component and all together 1,044 species were recorded.
- Port of Spain Bioblitz 2016 took the event to the nation's capital and included a Nature Fair with over 20 local NGOs, government organisations and charity groups putting on a biodiversity and environmental display. 762 species were found in and around the city.
- Icacos Bioblitz 2017 was the final event organised by Rutherford and took the bioblitz to the far south-west of Trinidad and recorded 769 species.
- Toco Bioblitz 2018 was organised by a committee made up of TTFNC members and staff from the University of the West Indies Department of Life Sciences from the St. Augustine campus. The north-east corner of Trinidad yielded 906 species records.

=== Türkiye ===
The first BioBlitz event in Kocaeli Province was held in Ormanya on 17 September 2021, with the support of Kocaeli Metropolitan Municipality. 113 different species were found at the event.

=== United Kingdom ===
Natural History Consortium host the National BioBlitz Network hosting free resources for running a BioBlitz event and the national BioBlitz Calendar. (www.bnhc.org.uk)

Examples of regions and organisations which have held BioBlitz events include:

- First UK Marine BioBlitz undertaken by the Marine Biological Association and the Natural History Museum together with other partners. Wembury, South Devon 2009
- Bristol – Organised by Bristol Natural History Consortium
- Northumberland – Organised by Northumberland Biodiversity Network
- New Forest National Park – Organised by New Forest National Park Authority
- Swansea – Organised by Swansea City Council
- Cairngorms – Organised by Cairngorms Biodiversity
- Dundee – Organised by Dundee City Council
- Leicester – Organised by Leicester City and County Council
- Isle of Wight – Organised by Isle of Wight Council
- London – Organised by OPAL
- Derby – Organised by Derby City Council
- Brighton – Organised by Sussex Wildlife Trust
- Bath – Organised by Bristol Natural History Consortium
- Mothecombe, Devon, – Marine and coastal BioBlitz – Organised by OPAL and the Marine Biological Association
- Jersey – Organised by the Durrell Wildlife Conservation Trust
- Fife – Organised by Fife Coast and Countryside Trust and "Celebrating Fife 2010"
- Cambridge – Organised by Cambridge University
- Lincolnshire – Organised by Lincolnshire Wildlife Trust
- Nottingham – Organised by Nottinghamshire Biodiversity Action Group
- Flintshire – Organised by Flintshire County Council
- North Ayrshire – Organised by North Ayrshire Council
- Lancashire – Organised by Lancashire Wildlife Trust
- Kent – Organised by Kent Wildlife Trust
- Corfe Mullen – Organised by Corfe Mullen Nature Watch
- Cornwall – Organised by ERCCIS
- North Devon – Organised by Coastwise North Devon.
- Sandford – Organised by Ambios
- Mount Edgcumb – Marine and coastal bioblitz organised by the Marine Biological Association

=== United States ===
- Alaska: The Chugach National Forest and Alaska Department of Fish & Game-Diversity Program organized the first BioBlitz in Southcentral Alaska on 23 and 24 July 2011, to coincide with the International Year of Forests.
- Arizona: More than 5,500 people, including 2,000 students and 150 scientists, attended the 2011 Saguaro BioBlitz, (21–22 October) and discovered 859 species during the 24 hour inventory period. Included in that total were more than 400 species, mostly invertebrate animals and non-vascular plants, which were previously unknown in the park. The accompanying Biodiversity Festival had an integrated art program that included pieces featuring local species, created by local students, seniors, and artists.
- California: The Santa Monica Mountains NPS/National Geographic Society BioBlitz (30–31 May 2008) was accomplished through collaboration with the Santa Monica Mountains Conservancy, California State Parks, and Los Angeles Recreation and Parks Department. Six thousand participants discovered more than 1,700 species during the 24 hour inventory period.
  - California: The San Diego Zoo Institute for Conservation Research hosted a BioBlitz in the San Dieguito River Park on the North Shore of Lake Hodges in Escondido 25–26 April.
  - California: The San Diego Natural History Museum began hosting a yearly BioBlitz starting in 2008. The 2008 BioBlitz was held in Balboa Park and in 2009 the event was held at Mission Trails Regional Park on 1–2 May.
  - California: The Santa Barbara Botanic Garden organized a BioBlitz of its natural spaces in May 2007.
  - California: Golden Gate National Recreation Area: On 28–29 March 2014, participants in the BioBlitz at Golden Gate Park sites, including Pt. Reyes National Seashore, Muir Woods National Monument, the Presidio of San Francisco, Mori Point, and Rancho Corral de Tierra observed and recorded biodiversity in habitats ranging from the redwood canopy to windswept beaches. Highlights included the first ever canopy survey of redwoods at Muir Woods, the first-ever, park sighting of a climbing salamander in Muir Woods; sightings of great horned, spotted, barred and saw-whet owls; and a mountain lion at Corral de Tierra.
- Colorado: The National Wildlife Federation has been providing a toolset based on the eNature.com species data in the Denver/Boulder metropolitan area since 2004. Results are online.
  - Colorado: On 24–25 August 2012, more than 150 scientists joined forces with 5,000 people of all ages and backgrounds to seek out the living creatures in Rocky Mountain National Park. Inventories took place in various ecological life zones, including ponderosa pine forests, the subalpine region, the tundra, and mountain meadows. Among the overall total of 490 species discovered, 138 were previously unknown to be in the park. A companion festival at the Estes Park Fairgrounds advanced and celebrated public awareness of biodiversity.
- Connecticut:
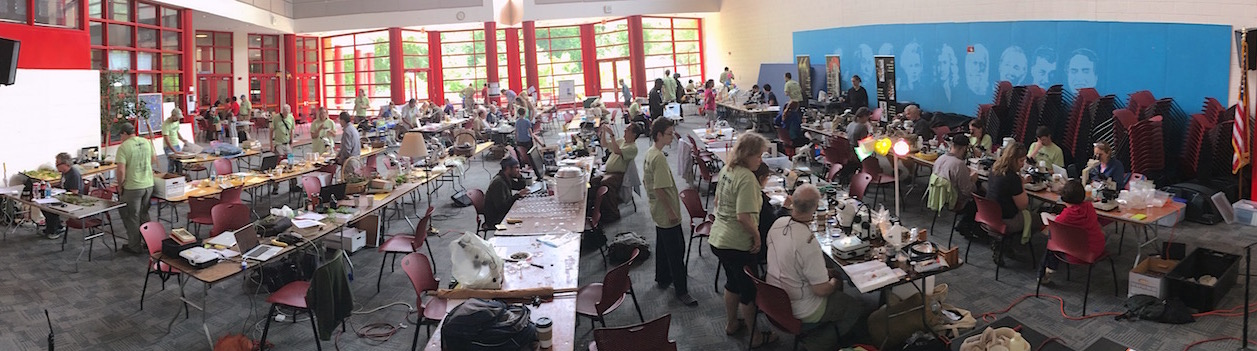
  2016 Connecticut BioBlitz scientists at work
  The Center for Conservation and Biodiversity and Connecticut State Museum of Natural History have held nine BioBlitz events since 1999. The current record for a single Connecticut BioBlitz was set 3–4 June 2016 in a 5-mile radius around the Two Rivers Magnet School in East Hartford, where 2,765 species were recorded in the 24-hour period. Many of the organisms sighted in the 2016 BioBlitz were documented in an online iNaturalist project. The previous record was set in 2001 at Tarrywile Park in Danbury, where 2,519 species were recorded in the 24-hour period.
- District of Columbia: A BioBlitz at the Kenilworth Park and Aquatic Gardens in Washington, D.C. in 1996 found approximately 1000 species.
  - Washington, D.C. 2007: The National Geographic Society held a BioBlitz in Rock Creek Park on 18–19 May. The event was later on a segment of the TV series Wild Chronicles which airs on PBS. Participants included J. Michael Fay, Sylvia Earle, and Boyd Matson. The first National Park Service/National Geographic Society BioBlitz took place on 18–19 May 2007. A wide breadth of taxonomic groups was examined, including amphibians and reptiles, invertebrates, birds, fish, fungi, mammals, plants, insects, and more. The total number of species found was 661 over a 24-hour period.
- Florida: In Manatee County, the local government's Department of Natural Resources (formerly Conservation Lands Management) has sponsored annual BioBlitz events, every spring since 2007. The surveys rotate between the county's different parks and preserves. This event, however, involves only a 12-hour survey instead of the standard 24-hour.
  - Florida: On 30 April – 1 May 2010, 2,500 citizen scientists worked with their professional counterparts to explore life in one of the nation's largest marine national parks, Biscayne National Park. More than 800 species were found, including a number of species rare to the park, such as the mangrove cuckoo, and silver hairstreak butterfly. Also, 11 species of lichen and 22 species of ants were found that had not previously been documented in the park.
- Hawaii: At Punahou School, a biannual BioBlitz is organized by the students. The event examines certain parts of the campus, and has been held there since the summer of 2008. The BioBlitz there happens once in winter, and once in summer.
  - Hawai'i: at Hawai'i Volcanoes National Park in 2015, working under the theme of I ka nānā no a ’ike ("By observing, one Learns"), traditional Hawaiian cultural practitioners, "alakai’i," were integrated into the survey teams, providing a holistic approach to the research and exploration activities. More than 170 leading scientists and alakai’i, teamed with thousands of public participants of all ages to explore one of the most fascinating biological landscapes in the world. Together they documented species that thrive in ecosystems from sea level to the summit of Kīlauea Volcano. Exciting finds included 22 new species added to the park's species list, and sightings of 73 threatened species, including the nēnē and Kamehameha butterfly. The number of fungi species on the park's list more than doubled, with 17 new fungi documented at the close of the event.
- Illinois: The Field Museum of Natural History and other organizations held a BioBlitz in Chicago in 2002. There are several bioblitzes in parts of the forest preserves of Cook and Lake County.
- Indiana: Indiana Dunes National Park – On 16 May 2009, more than 150 scientists, assisted by 2,000 grade school students and other members of the public, explored the sand dunes, lake shore, forests, wetlands, prairie, and streams of the recreation area. The excitement persevered through driving rain and high winds and resulted in the discovery of more than 1,200 species.
- Louisiana: The NPS/National Geographic Society BioBlitz at Jean Lafitte National Historical Park and Preserve (17–18 May 2013), brought together leading scientists and naturalists from around the country and local citizens of all ages. Inventories included herpetofaunal counts, aquatic and terrestrial invertebrate inventories, avifauna observations, and native and non-native plant surveys. Participants also used technology, such as tree cameras and smartphones, to record and understand the diverse ecosystems of this unique national park. At the time of the event's closing ceremony, 458 species had been identified, including a rare Louisiana milk snake, 288 plants, and 122 invertebrate species.
- Maine: The Maine Entomological Society and other organizations have been holding Entomological BioBlitzes at Acadia National Park every summer since 2003. Results of the 2003-2011 blitzes were summarized by Chandler et al., 2012, showing that 1,605 species representing 348 families of insects were taken and identified over the 8-year period. Many were new to the Park fauna, and a significant number were also new to the known state fauna.
- Maryland/DC/Virginia, 2006: The Nature Conservancy sponsored a Potomac Gorge BioBlitz where more than 130 field biologists and experienced naturalists volunteered their expertise in an effort to see how many species they could find. During a 30-hour survey period from Saturday, 24 June, through Sunday, 25 June their surveys revealed more than 1,000 species.
  - Maryland: Jug Bay BioBlitz was sponsored by the Maryland-National Capital Park and Planning Commission's (M-NCPPC) Patuxent River Park staff and rangers, 30–31 May 2009.
- Massachusetts
  - 2006 collaboration between the Boston Museum of Science and the Cape Cod Museum of Natural History. The first bioblitz in a series sponsored by the E.O. Wilson Biodiversity Foundation. The first bioblitz to utilize CyberTracker and NatureMapping technologies for data collection.
  - On 25–26 June 2010, a BioBlitz was held in Falmouth, Massachusetts, using town conservation land and adjacent land owned by the 300 Committee (T3C), Falmouth's land trust. Surveys for 15 taxa were planned. About 120 volunteers participated. Preliminary estimate of 930 species found but this number is likely to increase as data are finalized. Full results to be published later in 2010 on the T3C website.
  - On 29 September 2010, the TDWG Techno/BioBlitz was held alongside the Annual Biodiversity Information Standards Conference in Woods Hole.
  - On 8 July 2019, the Great Walden BioBlitz was held at Walden Pond, Massachusetts, surveying a five-mile radius around Walden Woods. Organized by Peter Alden in honor of E.O. Wilson's 90th birthday and the 30th Massachusetts bioblitz, public participants were encouraged to explore Walden Woods and Minute Man NHP using the iNaturalist phone app to help document species.
- Minnesota: A group of organizations including the Bell Museum of Natural History has sponsored BioBlitzes in natural areas in or near the Twin Cities yearly in June since 2004.
- Missouri: Sponsored by the Academy of Science of St. Louis, partners from the public, academic and corporate sectors collaborate on the Academy of Science-St. Louis BioBlitz at urban parks, such as Forest Park in St Louis . Held at least once a year since 2006, the academy's BioBlitz has hosted future BioBlitz leaders from throughout the country and is a signature event of one of the oldest Academies of Science in the USA. www.academyofsciencestl.org
- New Hampshire:
  - Odiorne Point State Park: The Seacoast Science Center has been hosting an annual BioBlitz! in September since 2003. The park's diversity of coastal habitats provides BioBlitzers the opportunity to find marine, freshwater and terrestrial species. The Center compiles and maintains each year's data.
  - Squam Lakes. 2008. The Squam Lakes Natural Science Center in collaboration with Squam Lakes Association and Squam Lakes Conservation Society in cooperation with the Holderness Conservation Commission, the US Forest Service Hubbard Brook Experimental Forest, UNH Cooperative Extension, Plymouth State University, NH Fish and Game Department, and Ecosystem Management Consultants.
- New Jersey State
  - Highlands, NJ
    - Gateway National Recreation Area, Sandy Hook Unit, 2011. On 16–17 Sept., science students, along with park staff and over 150 volunteers, located nearly 450 species, mostly birds, terrestrial plants and invertebrates.
    - Gateway National Recreation Area, Sandy Hook Unit, 2015. On 18–19 September, the American Littoral Society, in partnership with the National Park Service, hosted the second Sandy Hook BioBlitz. Over 150 scientists, naturalists, and volunteers raced against the clock to identify as many species as possible. This BioBlitz found 75 birds, 12 fungi/lichen, 21 fish, 2 reptiles/amphibians, 44 marine invertebrates, 2 insects, 13 mammals, 15 aquatic plants, and 87 terrestrial plants.
- New York State
  - New York City
    - Central Park, 2003. This BioBlitz found more than 800 species, including 393 species of plants, 78 of moths, 14 fungi, 10 spiders, 9 dragonflies, 2 tardigrades, 102 other invertebrates, 7 mammals, 3 turtles, 46 birds and 2 frog species. s.
    - Central Park, 2006. In collaboration with the E.O. Wilson Biodiversity Foundation, the Explorers Club, the American Museum of Natural History and the Boston Museum of Science. This is the first bioblitz in history to incorporate the collection and analysis of microorganisms.
    - Central Park, 2013. On 27–28 August 2013 a BioBlitz at Central Park was held in partnership with Macaulay Honors College of CUNY. With help from the Central Park Conservancy over 350 Macaulay students worked with nearly 30 scientists and cataloged more than 460 species.
    - New York Botanical Garden in the Bronx, 2014, 6 and 7 September, in partnership with Macaulay Honors College of CUNY.
  - The Saw Mill River watershed in Westchester County, September 2009. Groundwork Hudson Valley, leading the Saw Mill River Coalition, conducted a Saw Mill River BioBlitz on 25–26 September with more than 50 scientists from a wide variety of fields. A concurrent conference on the health of the river was held at Pace University in Pleasantville that was open to the public and had activities geared for children. Funded by a grant from Westchester Community Foundation with additional support from US EPA and NYS/DEC Hudson River Estuary Program. Major co-sponsors joining the effort were Westchester County Parks, Recreation and Conservation; Teatown Lake Reservation; Pace University's Department of Biology and Health Sciences; Pace University's Academy for Applied Environmental Studies; Sigma Xi: The Scientific Research Society; Greenburgh Nature Center; and the Saw Mill River Audubon.
- North Carolina: The North Carolina Botanical Garden in collaboration with the Morehead Planetarium sponsor an annual bioblitz in September on garden-owned property.
- Ohio: The Geauga Park District has hosted an annual BioBlitz at different park district properties since 2003.
- Oklahoma: The Oklahoma Biological Survey hosted an annual BioBlitz at different locations around Oklahoma starting in 2001. Their 2010 BioBlitz will be held on 8–9 October at Kaw Lake in north-central Oklahoma with a base camp at Camp McFadden.
- Pennsylvania: Phipps Conservatory hosted a Bioblitz on 10 June 2018, in Pittsburgh.
- Rhode Island: Rhode Island Natural History Survey has conducted a BioBlitz at a different site in the state every year since 2000, including a "backyard bioblitz" held in 2020, during COVID. Rhode Island BioBlitz may be the longest running annual BioBlitz in the world. In the 23 events through 2022, the average participation is 163 and the average species count is 1022; the record participation of 302 people and the record species count of 1,308 species were both in the Jamestown Rhode Island BioBlitz of 2012.
- Vermont: The Vermont Institute of Natural Science held a BioBlitz in 2004 at Hartford.
- Washington: BioBlitzes conducted using NatureTracker software on PDAs for conservation planning./
- Wisconsin: The Milwaukee Public Museum (MPM) hosts an annual BioBlitz program that began in 2015. MPM events have occurred at Schlitz Audubon Nature Center in Milwaukee (2015), Grant Park in South Milwaukee (2016), Fox River Park in Waukesha (2017), Lake Farm County Park/Capitol Springs Recreation Area in Madison (2018), Riveredge Nature Center in Saukville (2019), and Whitnall Park in Franklin (2020). The non-profit Biodiversity Project held three Great Lakes BioBlitzes with support from the Wisconsin Coastal Management Program and NOAA in 2004. The sites were Riverside Park in Milwaukee; Baird Creek Parkway in Green Bay; and Wisconsin Point in Superior.

== See also ==
- Australian Bird Count (ABC)
- Bush Blitz an Australian Government variant of the concept co funded by BHP Billiton and with the participation of Earthwatch Australia
- Breeding Bird Survey
- Christmas Bird Count (CBC) (in the Western Hemisphere)
- City Nature Challenge
- Seabird Colony Register (SCR)
- The EBCC Atlas of European Breeding Birds
- Tucson Bird Count (TBC) (in Arizona, US)
