= William Bert Emison =

William Bert Emison (1939–1999) was born in Boise, Idaho, studied zoology at the University of Montana, worked in the Antarctic studying the diet of the Adelie penguin, and received an MSc degree through Johns Hopkins University in 1967. Subsequently, he worked in the Aleutian Islands and studied the whistling swan before moving to Australia in 1972.

In Australia, after a year with the Department of the Environment of New South Wales, Emison moved to the Department of Fisheries and Wildlife, Victoria. There he ran a wildlife survey unit providing data to the Land Conservation Council of Victoria. He developed the Atlas of Victorian Wildlife database. Ho coauthored the Atlas of Victorian Birds (1987). He was also involved in studies of the white-bellied sea-eagle, peregrine falcon, long-billed corella, sulphur-crested cockatoo, red-tailed black-cockatoo, malleefowl and black-eared miner.

Emison joined the Royal Australasian Ornithologists Union (RAOU) in 1974 and served it as a Councillor 1982–1986, as Secretary 1983–1986. On retirement from the Victorian Public Service in 1994, he took up a PhD scholarship at Deakin University, examining the biogeography and taxonomy of Antarctic amphipods, a study he did not complete before his death.
