= Carla P. Catterall =

Australian ecologist and ornithologist

- Education: University of Queensland
- Awards: D. L. Serventy Medal (2010)
- Scientific career
- Fields: Ecology, ornithology
- Workplaces: Griffith University
- Thesis: Behavioural strategies of a silvereye population, (Zosterops lateralis chlorocephala Campbell and White), in relation to food resources, on a coral cay island (1979)

Carla Perdita Catterall (born 1951) is an Australian ecologist and ornithologist. As of 2021 she is Emeritus Professor at Griffith University.

== Career ==
Born in 1951, Catterall graduated from the University of Queensland with a PhD in 1979. Her thesis, titled "Behavioural strategies of a silvereye population, (Zosterops lateralis chlorocephala Campbell and White), in relation to food resources, on a coral cay island", was published by the Royal Australian Ornithologists Union in 1982.

In 2010 Catterall won the D. L. Serventy Medal in recognition of her "outstanding contributions to publication in the science of ornithology in the Australasian region". At the time of her award she was an associate professor at Griffith University and had "served on 13 advisory bodies and written 33 consultancy reports for local, state and commonwealth governments, community groups and private industry".

Catterall was president of the Ecological Society of Australia in the year of its 50th anniversary and was interviewed to celebrate that milestone. She is a former member of the editorial board of Emu: Australian Ornithology.

Her ornithological research has included studies of aggression between species such as Manorina melanocephala (noisy miners) as well as of birds spreading the seeds of fruits. She has also written about deforestation and the importance of biodiversity.

Catterall was appointed to the Australia Government's Threatened Species Scientific Committee in December 2023.
