= Australian Birdlife =

- Editor: Sean Dooley
- Categories: Birds, Ornithology
- Frequency: Quarterly
- Circulation: 10,000
- Publisher: BirdLife Australia
- First issue: March 2012
- Company: BirdLife Australia
- Country: Australia
- Based in: Melbourne
- Language: English
- Website: www.birdlife.org.au/australian-birdlife
- ISSN: 2200-0127

Australian Birdlife is the quarterly membership magazine of BirdLife Australia, the Australian partner of BirdLife International. It was first issued in 2012, replacing and succeeding both Wingspan, published by Birds Australia, and the Bird Observer, published by Bird Observation and Conservation Australia (BOCA), when the two organisations merged.

Australian Birdlife is a glossy colour magazine that contains articles on wild birds, birding, and bird conservation in Australasia and adjacent regions.
