= Sonia Kleindorfer =

Bird ecologist and researcher

Sonia Kleindorfer is a bird ecology expert with a focus on organismal complexity and the impact animals have on evolutionary dynamics in birds and parasites. She heads Grünau's Core Facility Konrad Lorenz Research Station for Behaviour and Cognition and is Scientific Director of the Flinders Research Centre for Climate Adaptation and Animal Behaviour.

== Education ==
Kleindorfer holds a bachelor's degree in Biological Basis of Behavior from the University of Pennsylvania, a PhD in Zoology from the University of Vienna, and a postdoc in Medicine from the University of Washington School of Medicine.

== Career ==
Kleindorfer heads Grünau's Core Facility Konrad Lorenz Research Station for Behaviour and Cognition. She is Scientific Director of the Flinders Research Centre for Climate Adaptation and Animal Behaviour.

From 2017, Kleindorfer was treasurer of the Royal Society of South Australia, after which she was promoted to Vice President.

== Awards ==
In 2016, Kleindorfer received the D. L. Serventy Medal from BirdLife Australia.
