= Dawn Whyatt Frith =

English and Australian ornithologist, zoologist and author

Dawn W. Frith is an English born Australian citizen and ornithologist. She is now a self-employed zoological researcher, consultant, natural history author, and publisher.

Dawn obtained her PhD, in littoral zone marine biology on a study of the biology of animals living on the littoral sponges with special reference to Halichondria panicea (Pallas), at London University and lectured in zoology before meeting Clifford Brodie Frith on Aldabra Atoll, Indian Ocean where she was a visiting scientist studying insects and he a staff scientist studying birds. Their full-time partnership began in April 1973. They married at Bangkok Central Police Station, in October 1975. In December 1977, they moved to tropical north Queensland, Australia, to start decades of field studies of bowerbirds and birds-of-paradise and other rainforest-dwelling bird species in tropical eastern Australia and in the Papua New Guinea highlands. Together they have published some 150 substantial scientific papers in international peer-reviewed zoological journals. Their studies are largely self-funded by proceeds from their own publishing partnership.

Dawn has written and illustrated many semi-scientific and popular articles in magazines worldwide, has acted as scientific and/or technical adviser and/or associate producer to various feature and television film makers. She has much experience of giving personal presentations at both popular and scientific levels, and also carries out ecological and avifaunal surveys for various environmental agencies in tropical north Queensland, Australia.

== Zoologist ==
Dawn started her professional career as a zoology lecturer in England (1968–1973) before taking a year's absence from her position as a visiting scientist at the Royal Society of London Research Station Aldabra Atoll, Western Indian Ocean. Her research was focused on monitoring populations of terrestrial and freshwater invertebrates on Aldabra. All collected material was deposited at the British Museum (Natural History), London. In 1974, she became a senior marine biologist/advisor at Phuket Marine Biological Centre, Phuket Island, Thailand, being employed by the Danish Ministry of Foreign Affairs (DANIDA), Copenhagen, Denmark.

Since 1977, Dawn, with Clifford B. Frith, has studied various aspects of tropical rainforest avifauna in Australia, New Guinea and elsewhere for over three decades. Her studies have resulted in many scientific publications (84 to date) on the behaviour, nesting biology, mating systems, and systematics of bowerbirds, birds-of-paradise, and other rainforest-dwelling bird species. Her systematic scientific studies have resulted in a major "definitive" ornithological text book - The Bowerbirds: Ptilonorhynchidae. She has performed part-time lecturing in Australia: at Monash University, Victoria and James Cook University, Townsville, Queensland.

== Awards ==
In 1992, Dawn was awarded the Certificate of Honour by the Phuket Marine Biological Center "in recognition of support of the PMBC's endeavours in conducting research on marine science and conservation of marine environment and resources in Thailand".

In 1996, she was awarded the D. L. Serventy Medal for Ornithology, jointly with her husband Clifford B. Frith, by the Royal Australasian Ornithologists Union - for original contributions to Australasian ornithology of international significance. They were also jointly awarded the 2006 Cassowary Award by the Australian Wet Tropics Authority – for the Arts Category "for an outstanding contribution to aesthetic appreciation of the Wet Tropics of Queensland World Heritage Area". In 2008 they were awarded the prestigious Whitley Book Award in the Field Natural History section for their book Bowerbirds: Nature. Art & History. In 2011 they were awarded the prestigious Whitley Book Award for in the Popular Zoology section for their book Birds of Paradise: Nature, Art & History.

On June 14, 2021 Dawn was awarded the Medal of the Order of Australia (OAM) for contributions "to conservation and the environment".

== Publishing ==
In July 1984 Dawn and Clifford established their small publishing house (initially and briefly called Tropical Australia Graphics and then Frith & Frith books) producing eleven high quality full colour natural history books: including the second edition of the large hardback book Daintree- Where the Rainforest Meets the Reef by Rupert Russell in 1994; and the second edition of the large hardback Cape York Peninsula: a Natural History by Clifford Frith and Dawn Frith. They also self-published the two large hardback books: Bowerbirds: Nature, Art & History (2008) and Birds of Paradise: Nature, Art & History (2010) written, designed and illustrated by themselves.

== Bibliography of books and major book chapters ==
- Frith, C.B. & Frith, D.W. 1983*. Australian Tropical Rainforest Life. Speciality Education Supplies, Townsville, 72 pp. softback. Second edition 1986 (reprinted 1987) Frith & Frith.
- Frith, C.B. & Frith, D.W. 1985*. Australian Tropical Birds. Tropical Australia Graphics, Paluma. 72 pp. softback. Reprinted 1986, 1989.
- Frith, D. & Frith, C. 1985. A Walk in the Rainforest. Tropical Australia Graphics, Paluma. 52 pp. softback. Reprinted 1987.
- Frith, C.B. & Frith, D.W. 1987*. Australian Tropical Reptiles and Frogs. Tropical Australia Graphics, Paluma. 72 pp. softback. Reprinted.
- Frith, C.B. & Frith, D.W. 1987. Australian Tropical Reef Life. Tropical Australia Graphics. Paluma. 72 pp. softback. Reprinted.
- Frith, D.W. & Frith, C.B. 1991*. Australia's Cape York Peninsula. Frith & Frith Books. 72 pp. softback.
- Frith, C.B. & Frith, D.W. 1992*. Australia's Wet Tropics Rainforest Life. Frith & Frith books, Malanda. 72 pp. softback. Reprinted.
- Frith, D. & Frith, C. 1993. "A Guide to Rainforest Ecology of Karawari Lodge & the Sepik and Ambua Lodge & Tari Gap", Papua New Guinea. Pata Foundation, California and Trans Niugini Tours, Papua New Guinea (joint funding). 58 pp. softback report.
- Frith, D.W. & Frith, C.B. 1995*. Cape York Peninsula:a Natural History. Reed, Sydney. 256 pp., > 500 colour photos, hardback. Reprinted 2006 with amendments by Frith & Frith, Malanda. ISBN 0-7301-0469-9
- Frith, C.B. & Frith, D.W. 2006. Editors to and the authors of the chapters "Paradisaeidae" (33 pp.) and "Ptilonorhynchidae" (127 pp.) in P.J. Higgins, J.M. Peter, and S.J. Cowling (eds.) Handbook of Australian, New Zealand & Antarctic Birds Volume 7, Part A, Boatbills to Larks. Oxford University press, Melbourne.
- Frith, C.B. & Frith, D.W. 2004. The Bowerbirds: Ptilonorhynchidae. Oxford University Press, Oxford. 508 pp. hardback. ISBN 0-19-854844-3
- Frith, C.B. & Frith, D.W. 2008.* Bowerbirds: Nature, Art & History. 305 pp, 270 colour 50 monochrome illustrations. hardback. Frith & Frith, Malanda. ISBN 978-1-876473-63-1
- Frith, C.B. & Frith, D.W. 2009. chapters "The Bowerbirds" and "The Birds of Paradise", In The Handbook to the Birds of the World. Volume 12. Lynx Edicions, Barcelona. 2008.
- Frith, C.B. & Frith, D.W. 2010.* Birds of Paradise: Nature, Art & History, 370 pp, 350 colour & 120 monochrome illustrations. Frith & Frith, Malanda. hardback. 2010. ISBN 978-0-646-53298-1

(* those works also illustrated by Clifford B. Frith's photography)
