= The Stilt =

- Discipline: Zoology
- Language: English

Publication details
- History: 1981–present
- Publisher: BirdLife Australia

Standard abbreviations
- ISO 4: Stilt

Indexing
- ISSN: 0726-1888

Links
- Journal homepage; Online archive

Stilt is the journal of the Australasian Wader Studies Group (AWSG), a special interest group of BirdLife Australia (formerly the Royal Australasian Ornithologists Union). It was first issued in 1981.

The journal publishes research on waders in the East Asian-Australasian Flyway. It is published biannually, in April and October.

== See also ==
- List of ornithology journals
