= Alan Leishman =

Alan Leishman is a now retired Australian garden administrator and amateur ornithologist. He previously worked for the Royal Botanic Gardens, Sydney. He is a bird-bander and has had a long association with the Australian Bird Study Association, serving as foundation editor of its journal Corella 1977–1983, and production editor 1984–1989. In 1998 he was awarded the RAOU's John Hobbs Medal for outstanding contributions to Australian ornithology as an amateur.

== See also ==
- List of ornithologists
