= Clifford Brodie Frith =

Australian ornithologist and photographer

Clifford Brodie Frith OAM (born 1949) is an Australian ornithologist and wildlife photographer. He and his wife Dawn Whyatt Frith have studied and published on Australian birds for many years, and publish books as Frith & Frith.

== Early life and education ==
Clifford Brodie Frith was born in 1949.

In 2002 Frith obtained his PhD at Griffith University, Queensland, for his 1200-page thesis "Evolutionary studies of bowerbirds and birds of paradise: affinities and divergence".

== Ornithologist ==
Frith commenced his ornithological career at the Natural History Museum, London, where he worked from 1967 to 1970. Most of 1968 was spent in tropical Australia on the Fifth Harold Hall Australian Expedition to the Kimberley and Arnhem Land areas. He was resident ornithological staff scientist on Aldabra Atoll in the Indian Ocean for the Royal Society of London from 1972 to 1973. He then lived on Phuket Island in southern Thailand until moving the Australia to live.

Since 1977, Frith, with his wife Dawn W. Frith, has studied various aspects of tropical rainforest avifauna in Australia, New Guinea, and elsewhere for over three decades. His studies have resulted in many scientific publications on the behaviour, nesting biology, mating systems, and systematics of bowerbirds, birds of paradise, and other rainforest-dwelling bird species. He has produced two major ornithological text books: The Birds of Paradise: Paradisaeidae (1998), and The Bowerbirds: Ptilonorhynchidae (2004).

== Publisher ==
In July 1984 Clifford and Dawn Frith established their small publishing house (initially and briefly called Tropical Australia Graphics and then Frith&Frith Books).

The couple publishes wildlife photography books under the publisher name "Frith & Frith".

== Awards ==
Clifford Frith

- 2014: Whitley Award in the field of historical zoology, for his book The Woodhen
- 2021: Medal of the Order of Australia for "service to conservation and the environment", in the 2021 Queen's Birthday Honours

Clifford and Dawn Frith (as joint winners)

- 1996: D. L. Serventy Medal from the Royal Australasian Ornithologists Union, for original contributions to Australasian ornithology of international significance
- 2006: Cassowary Award, by the Australian Wet Tropics Authority, in the Arts Category "for an outstanding contribution to aesthetic appreciation of the Wet Tropics of Queensland World Heritage Area"
- 2008: Whitley Award in the Field Natural History section, for Bowerbirds: Nature, Art & History
- 2011: Whitley Award in the field of popular zoology, for Birds of Paradise: Nature, Art & History

== Bibliography of books and major chapters ==
- Frith, C.B. & Frith, D.W. 1983*. Australian Tropical Rainforest Life. Speciality Education Supplies, Townsville, 72 pp.
- Frith, C.B. & Frith, D.W. 1985*. Australian Tropical Birds. Tropical Australia Graphics, Paluma. 72 pp.
- Frith, D. & Frith, C. 1985. A Walk in the Rainforest. Tropical Australia Graphics, Paluma. 52 pp.
- Frith, C.B. 1986. Garden Birds - Attracting Birds to Australian and New Zealand Gardens. Doubleday, Sydney. 160 pp.
- Frith, C.B. & Frith, D.W. 1987*. Australian Tropical Reptiles and Frogs. Tropical Australia Graphics, Paluma. 72 pp.
- Frith, C.B. & Frith, D.W. 1987. Australian Tropical Reef Life. Tropical Australia Graphics, Paluma. 72 pp. softback.
- Frith, D.W. & Frith, C.B. 1991*. Australia's Cape York Peninsula. Frith&Frith, Malanda. 72 pp.
- Frith, C.B. & Frith, D.W. 1992*. Australia's Wet Tropics Rainforest Life. Frith&Frith 72 pp.
- Frith, D. & Frith, C. 1993. A Guide to Rainforest Ecology of Karawari Lodge & the Sepik and Ambua Lodge & Tari Gap, Papua New Guinea. Pata Foundation, California and Trans Niugini Tours, Papua New Guinea (joint funding). 58 pp.
- Frith, D.W. & Frith, C.B. 1995*. Cape York Peninsula - a Natural History. Reed, Sydney. 256 pp.
- Frith, C.B. & Beehler, B.M. 1998. The Birds of Paradise: Paradisaeidae. Oxford University Press, Oxford. 630 pp.
- Frith, C.B. & Frith, D.W. 2006. Editors to and major authors of Chapters Paradisaeidae (33 pp.) and Ptilonorhynchidae (127 pp.) in P. J. Higgins, J.M. Peter, and S.J. Cowling (eds.) Handbook of Australian, New Zealand & Antarctic Birds Volume 7, Part A, Boatbills to Larks. Oxford University press, Melbourne.
- Frith, C.B. & Frith, D.W. 2004. The Bowerbirds: Ptilonorhynchidae. Oxford University Press, Oxford. 508 pp.
- Frith, C.B., with Erritzoe, J. et al. 2007. The Ornithologist’s Dictionary. Lynx Edicions, Barcelona. 290 pp.
- Frith, C.B. & Frith, D.W. 2008.* Bowerbirds: Nature, Art & History. 305 pp.
- Frith, C.B. & Frith, D.W. 2009. Chapters The Bowerbirds and The Birds of Paradise in The Handbook to the Birds of the World. Volume 12. Lynx Edicions, Barcelona. 2008.
- Frith, C. B. and Frith, D. W. 2009.* Family Ptilonorhynchidae (Bowerbirds) in del Hoyo, J., Elliot, A. and Christie, D. A. (eds.) Handbook of the Birds of the World. Volume 14: Bush-shrikes to Old World Sparrows. Lynx Edicions, Barcelona.
- Frith, C. B. and Frith, D. W. 2009.* Family Paradisaeidae (Birds of Paradise) in del Hoyo, J., Elliot, A. and Christie, D. A. (eds.) Handbook of the Birds of the World. Volume 14: Bush-shrikes to Old World Sparrows. Lynx Edicions, Barcelona.
- Frith, C.B. & Frith, D.W. 2010.* Birds of Paradise: Nature, Art & History, 370 pp.
- Frith, C.B. 2013.* The Woodhen: A Flightless Island Bird Defying Extinction, 225 pp. CSIRO Publishing, Melbourne.
- Frith, C.B. 2016 (reprinted 2020).* Charles Darwin's Life With Birds: His Complete Ornithology , 499 pp. Oxford University Press, New York.
- Frith, C.B. & Frith, D.W. 2023. "A Wild Romance: 50 Years Studying and Photographing Wildlife Around the World", 400 pp. Frith & Frith, Malanda.

(* = those works also illustrated by Clifford's photography)
