= Joint Nature Conservation Committee =

Public advisory body in the United Kingdom

The Joint Nature Conservation Committee (JNCC) is the public body that advises the Government of the United Kingdom and devolved administrations on UK-wide and international nature conservation.

Originally established under the Environmental Protection Act 1990, JNCC was reconstituted by the Natural Environment and Rural Communities Act 2006.

JNCC is led by the Joint Committee, which brings together members from the nature conservation bodies for England, Scotland, Wales and Northern Ireland and independent members appointed by the Secretary of State for the Environment, Food and Rural Affairs under an independent chair.

Support is provided to the committee by a company set up and controlled by the Committee solely for that purpose. The company employs around 130 people. They bring together scientific and technical expertise, extensive knowledge of policy at global, European and national levels and skills in working with other organisations. Staff are based in offices in Peterborough and Aberdeen.

The Joint Committee leads JNCC and has overall responsibility for its work. The Accountability Framework Document, Management Statement and Financial Memorandum provide the legal, administrative and financial framework within which the Joint Committee operates.

The membership of the committee is defined in schedule 4 of the Natural Environment and Rural Communities Act 2006. Current members are as below.

The committee meets four times in March, June, September and November. Members discuss strategic nature conservation and organizational issues as well as making high-level advice, strategy, funding and planning decisions.

The committee is committed to the principle of open government and has been holding open meetings since 2001. Members of the public are welcome to attend meetings as observers except when confidential issues are being discussed. Agendas and committee papers are made available one week ahead of meetings and draft minutes six weeks later. Inter-sessional papers, provided between committee meetings, are also available. Meetings are run in accordance with a set of standing orders.

== Chairs and current members ==
- Peter Bridgewater (2007–2014)
- Chris Gilligan (2014–2020)
- Charles Banner (2023–2024)
- Cath Denholm (interim, 2024–2025)
- Tom Meager (interim, 2025)
- David Cooper (2025–present)

== See also ==
- Geological Conservation Review
- Seabird Colony Register
