= Harry Frederick Recher =

Australian ornithologist

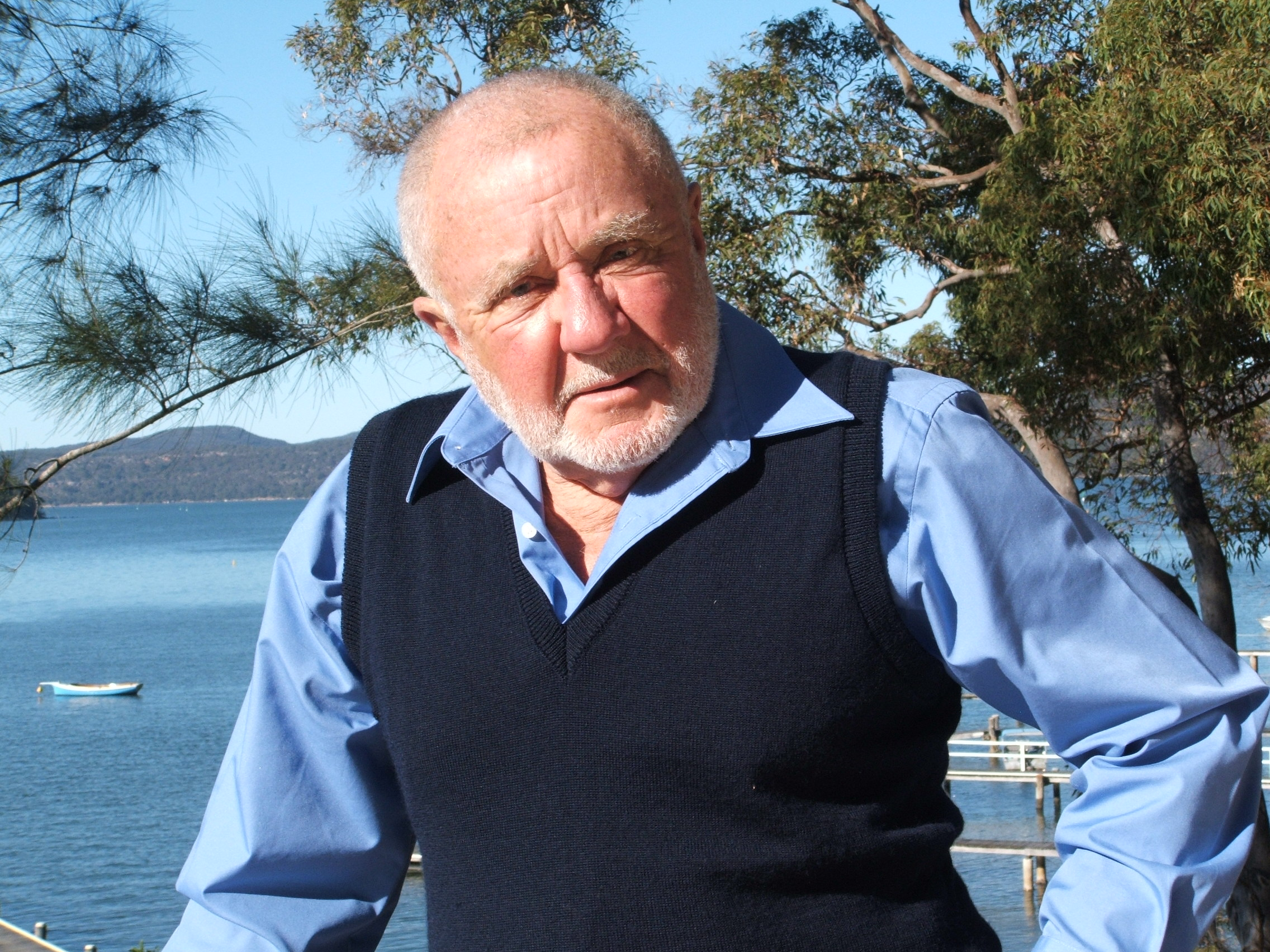
- Harry Frederick Recher, 2014
- Born: 27 March 1938 (age 88); New York City, New York, USA
- Education: Syracuse University(B.Sc), Stanford University (PhD)
- Awards: Order Of Australia (AM), D. L. Serventy Medal, Fellow of the Royal Zoological Society (NSW)
- Scientific career
- Fields: Ornithology, conservation, ecology
- Workplaces: University of Pennsylvania, Princeton University, University of Sydney, Australian Museum, University of New England (Australia), Edith Cowan University

Emeritus Professor Harry Frederick Recher RZS (NSW) AM (born 27 March 1938, New York City) is an Australian ecologist, ornithologist and advocate for conservation.

Recher grew up in the United States of America. He studied at the State University of New York College of Forestry and received his B.S. in 1959 from Syracuse University. At Stanford University, ecologist Paul Ehrlich supervised his PhD on migratory shorebirds that was awarded in 1964. Ehrlich became a lifelong friend and mentor to Recher; also sharing his commitment to a strong sense of social responsibility of science. Recher held an NIH postdoctoral fellowship at the University of Pennsylvania and Princeton University. In his early career, Recher worked with leading American ecologists Eugene Odum and Robert McArthur.

He moved to Australia in 1967. From 1968 he worked for 20 years at the Australian Museum as a Principal Research Scientist, focusing on conservation issues and the biology of forest and woodland birds. In 1988 he moved to the University of New England. He was also a member of the National Parks and Wildlife Service (NPWS) Scientific Advisory Committee.

Recher was co-editor and author of three books, A natural legacy: ecology in Australia ( 1979), Birds of eucalypt forests and woodland: ecology, conservation, management. (1985) and Woodlands of Australia, all of which were awarded the Whitley Medal by the Royal Zoological Society of New South Wales. As an early Australian ecology textbook, A Natural Legacy with co-editors Irina Dunn and Dan Lunney with David Milledge's hand-drawings illustrating the principles of community ecology and succession, Recher influenced a generation in an era of resurgent environmentalism.

Recher is heralded for his long-term field studies, especially of bird communities. In the 1980s, Recher and his colleagues applied these studies to identify the conservation requirements for native birds and animals in their specific habitats. In 2003 the statutory management plan, NPWS Nadgee Nature Reserve Plan of Management acknowledged the value of his work:

Other significant long term studies which are still ongoing include long term monitoring of heathland bird communities by Harry Recher, and long term study of the impact of fire, drought and flood on forest-dependent mammals by NPWS [...].

In 1990, Recher stood as a NSW candidate for the Australian Senate as an environmental independent with Irina Dunn, who was formerly a member of the House of Representatives for the Nuclear Disarmament Party. After the election, Recher continued publishing about communications between ecologists, the media and politicians, and everyone. He remained a passionate advocate for conservation and for scientists communicating well about pressing issues of conservation and climate change.

In 1995 he was foundation editor of Pacific Conservation Biology and continued to serve as an associate editor.

In 1996 he became the Foundation Professor in Environmental Management at Edith Cowan University in Perth, Western Australia. As an intellectual leader in the field, Recher remained deeply committed to the contribution of science to policy for conservation and public understanding of ecology.

In 1994 he was awarded the Royal Australasian Ornithologists Union's D.L. Serventy Medal for outstanding published work on birds in the Australasian region. As well as numerous published scientific papers, he has authored and edited several books.

== General references ==
- Robin, Libby. (2001). The Flight of the Emu: a hundred years of Australian ornithology 1901-2001. Carlton, Vic. Melbourne University Press. ISBN 0-522-84987-3
