= Hugh Alastair Ford =

Australian ornithologist

Dr Hugh Alastair Ford (born 1946) is an Australian ornithologist.

In 1973 he moved to Australia, first to Adelaide and then, in 1977, to the University of New England at Armidale. He is known for studies on honeyeaters, the ecology of woodland birds, and the relationship between birds and plants.

He joined the Royal Australasian Ornithologists Union (RAOU) in 1975, and was editor of the RAOU journal Emu 1981–1985. In 1993 he was awarded the D.L. Serventy Medal for outstanding published work on birds in the Australasian region. As well as numerous published scientific papers, he has authored and edited several books. Among these are:

- Ford, Hugh A. (1989). Ecology of Birds. An Australian perspective. Australian Ecology Series. Surrey Beatty & Sons Pty Ltd: Sydney.
- Ford, Hugh A.; & Paton, D.C. (Eds). (1986). The Dynamic Partnership. Birds and plants in southern Australia. Handbooks of the Flora and Fauna of South Australia. Government Printer: Adelaide.
- Keast, Allen; Recher, H.F.; Ford, H.; & Saunders, D. (Eds). (1985). Birds of Eucalypt Forests and Woodlands: Ecology, Conservation, Management. Surrey Beatty & Sons Pty Ltd: Sydney.
