= John Frith =

John Frith may refer to:

- John Frith (assailant) (fl. 1760–1791), English petitioner and asylum inmate
- John Frith (cartoonist) (c. 1908–2000), Australian cartoonist, at The Herald in Melbourne in the 1950s and 1960s
- John Frith (martyr) (1503–1533), English Protestant martyr
- John Frith (rugby league) (born 1985), Australian rugby league player
- John Frith (trade unionist) (1837–1904), British trade union leader
