= Tucson Bird Count =

Citizen science project

The Tucson Bird Count (TBC) is a community-based program that monitors bird populations in and around the Tucson, Arizona, United States metropolitan area. With nearly 1000 sites monitored annually, the Tucson Bird Count is among the largest urban biological monitoring programs in the world.

== Methods ==
Each spring, TBC participants collect data on bird abundance and distribution at hundreds of point count locations arrayed across the Tucson basin. The TBC is an example of citizen science, drawing on the combined efforts of hundreds of volunteers. So that data are of suitable quality for scientific analysis and decisionmaking, all TBC volunteers are skilled birdwatchers; many are also professional field guides or biologists. TBC methods are similar to those employed by the North American Breeding Bird Survey, although the TBC uses more closely spaced sites (one site per 1-km^{2} square) over a smaller total area (approximately 1000 km^{2}). The TBC's spatially systematic monitoring is complemented by a TBC park monitoring program that surveys parks, watercourses, or other areas of particular interest multiple times throughout the year.

== Uses of data ==
Uses of Tucson Bird Count data include monitoring the status of the Tucson-area bird community over time, finding the areas and land-use practices that are succeeding at sustaining native birds, and investigating the ecology of birds in human-dominated landscapes. Tucson Bird Count results have led to scientific publications, informed Tucson-area planning, and contributed a variety of projects, from locating populations of imperiled species to estimating risk to humans from West Nile Virus. The TBC and several associated research projects are examples of reconciliation ecology, in that they investigate how native species can be sustained in and around the places people live, work, and play. Researchers have also used TBC data to explore the extent to which urban humans are separated from nature (Turner et al. 2004)

Recently, the city of Ottawa, Canada, has initiated an urban bird survey that is largely modeled on the Tucson Bird Count. The Ottawa Breeding Bird Count will conduct its inaugural season in 2007. By collaborating among cities, urban surveys like the Tucson Bird Count and the Ottawa Breeding Bird Count, will help researchers discover ways to create habitat for biodiversity in the places where people live and work.

== Basic results ==
The Tucson Bird Count began in spring 2001. As of summer 2005, the TBC had recorded 192,000 individual birds belonging to 212 distinct species. About 115 of these species are known or suspected to breed in the Tucson area; the remainder are migrants (either to higher latitudes, or to higher elevations in nearby mountain ranges such as the Catalinas) or vagrants.

Because the data are entered directly by participants into the Tucson Bird Count web site, results are publicly available on-line with little delay after observations are made. Among the project's more basic, yet striking results are distribution maps for species in the Tucson area. Many species show strong patterns with respect to development intensity, presence of various habitats, or other factors. For example, the non-native rock pigeon, common in urban areas worldwide, is generally restricted to Tucson's urban core. In contrast, Gambel's quail, a characteristic species of Sonoran Desert upland habitats, shows the inverse pattern, common near Tucson's periphery yet absent from most of the more heavily developed central portion of the city.

== See also ==
- Australian Bird Count (ABC)
- BioBlitz ("24-hour inventory")
- Breeding Bird Survey
- Christmas Bird Count (CBC) (in the Western Hemisphere)
