= Atlas of Australian Birds =

Cover of New Atlas of Australian Birds book

The Atlas of Australian Birds is a major ongoing database project initiated and managed by BirdLife Australia (formerly the Royal Australasian Ornithologists Union) to map the distribution of Australia's bird species. BirdLife Australia is a not-for-profit bird research and conservation organisation.

There have been other bird atlases produced for various countries and islands around the world, but the Australian project was the first to cover an entire continent. Volunteers collected data on Australian birds in order to establish a database and publish a book, The Atlas of Australian Birds (1984), summarising the findings. A second period of fieldwork nearly 20 years later resulted in the publication of a second book, The New Atlas of Australian Birds, in 2002. However, the Atlas is an ongoing project.

== 1984 book ==
The idea of an Australian bird atlas based on data collected by volunteer observers (atlassers) was first mooted in 1972. Because of the daunting scale of the task, however, to test feasibility, a pilot atlas was carried out on the southern coast of New South Wales from March 1973 to September 1974 with 168 volunteers covering an area of 13,600 square kilometres. In August 1974, the 16th International Ornithological Congress was held in Canberra, providing an opportunity for discussions with other ornithologists involved in atlas schemes outside Australia, leading to a decision to proceed.

It was recognised that although the fieldwork would be carried out by volunteers, some funding for project management was required. In February 1976 the RAOU received a grant from the Australian Government enabling the appointment of a full-time staff member whose first task was to search existing ornithological literature for records suitable for a complementary Historical Atlas. Further discussions in 1976 produced decisions about how the main atlas project would be structured and organised.

Methodology was kept simple: atlassers used maps to determine or locate a one degree grid square and then recorded all species of birds seen within it. Date, location and species data were recorded on survey sheets and later entered by hand on a computer database. Fieldwork began on 1 January 1977 and ended five years later on 31 December 1981. Data were received from every single one-degree block of the Australian continent, Tasmania and adjacent islands, with 3000 atlassers completing 90,000 survey sheets producing 2.7 million records (sightings) of 716 bird species. During the course of the Atlas fieldwork period, the Chair of the RAOU's Atlas Committee was Pauline Reilly and the project manager Margaret Blakers. In 1984 a book was published of the results.

In 1987 a spin-off book, the Atlas of Victorian Birds, was published jointly by the RAOU and the Victorian Department of Conservation, Forests and Lands, covering only the state of Victoria but at a higher (10-minute) resolution and with more detail on reporting rates and seasonal variations.

== 2002 book ==
Some 20 years after the commencement of fieldwork for the first Atlas, in 1997, Birds Australia began negotiations with Environment Australia towards obtaining funding for a new atlas project. In 1998, a grant from the Natural Heritage Trust's Bushcare and Wetlands programs was approved.

Fieldwork began in August 1998 and has continued since, though after about four years there was a funding cut-off as well as a deadline for book publication purposes late in 2002. Methodology was based on that of the first Atlas but improved by the use of GPS receivers and scannable survey sheets. During the four-year period over 7,000 atlassers completed 279,000 surveys, producing 4.7 million records of 772 bird species. Coverage was greater than the first Atlas since, as well as the Australian continent and major islands, the second Atlas included records from Australia's territorial waters and the external territories of Christmas Island, Cocos (Keeling) Islands and Norfolk Island. As with the first Atlas, the results have been published as a book, "The New Atlas of Australian Birds"

== Ongoing developments ==
The Atlas is now in its ongoing phase and is now accepting electronic survey forms via the Birdata website. Analysis of Atlas data is published by BirdLife Australia in the State of Australia's Birds report series.

== The database ==
Between the end of the five-year data collection of the first Atlas, and the beginning of fieldwork for the second Atlas, very little atlassing took place at a national level. However, since the end of the cut-off period for the inclusion of data in the second Atlas book, atlassing has continued. The database contains not only the complete dataset on which the two hard-copy atlases were published, but much additional material gathered since. Because of this, Birds Australia claims that the Atlas database is "one of the most important environmental databases in the world".

The stated aims of the Atlas of Australian Birds project were to:

- Collect and analyse data on the distribution and relative abundance of Australia's bird species.
- Compare the distribution and abundance of bird species to the previous Atlas.
- Collect information on rare and threatened bird species.
- Involve the community in the conservation and monitoring of Birds.

The success of the project prompted the launch of a number of similar projects, one notable example being The Banksia Atlas, a distribution atlas of Banksia species that greatly increased knowledge of Banksia species distributions and habitat, and even resulted in the discovery of two new species.
