= Australasian Raptor Association =

The Australasian Raptor Association (ARA) was founded in 1978 as a special interest group of the Royal Australasian Ornithologists Union, also known as Birds Australia. It is now a special interest group of BirdLife Australia. It promotes the study and conservation of the diurnal and nocturnal raptors, sometimes called birds of prey, of Australasia and South-east Asia. It publishes a journal, Boobook, twice a year.
