= Wingspan (magazine) =

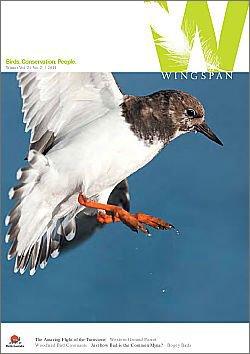
- Cover of the June 2011 issue
- Editor: Sean Dooley
- Categories: Birds, ornithology
- Frequency: Quarterly
- Circulation: 8000
- Publisher: Birds Australia
- First issue: 1991
- Final issue: 2011
- Company: Royal Australasian Ornithologists Union
- Country: Australia
- Based in: Melbourne
- Language: English
- Website: birdlife.org.au/publications
- ISSN: 1036-7810

Wingspan was the quarterly membership magazine of the Royal Australasian Ornithologists Union (RAOU). It was first issued in 1991, replacing the RAOU Newsletter. When Birds Australia and Bird Observation and Conservation Australia merged in 2012 to form BirdLife Australia, Wingspan's run ended, and was replaced with Australian Birdlife magazine.

Wingspan was a glossy colour magazine that contained articles on wild birds and birding in Australasia and adjacent regions. Regular content included articles on bird identification, biology and conservation, as well as reviews, letters and coverage of the RAOU's projects and membership activities. It was partly supported by advertising, most of which is related to birding, such as for binoculars and telescopes, holiday accommodation, and bird touring. It was distributed to RAOU members. It was repeatedly recognised in the Whitley Awards, as "Best Periodical" in 2007, 2008 and 2011, "Outstanding Periodical" in 2006, "Best Specialist Periodical" in 2000 and 2003, and as "Best Zoological Periodical" in 2001.

Birds Australia also produced a number of other publications as supplements to Wingspan magazine. These were circulated to Birds Australia members along with the magazine, and included the annual State of Australia's Birds reports, as well as occasional specialised publications, such as Birds on Farms (2000), Shorebird Conservation in Australia (2002) and Fire and Birds (2005).

== Australian Birdlife ==
Australian Birdlife has been the membership magazine of BirdLife Australia since March 2012, replacing Birds Australia's Wingspan magazine and BOCA's Bird Observer after the two organisations merged in 2012.

The magazine is issued quarterly, and contains articles about Australia's native birds, their conservation and the people who work to save them. Regular content includes features on bird identification, species profiles, biology and conservation, as well as reviews, gardening and photography columns, and coverage of BirdLife Australia projects and membership activities. It is distributed to BirdLife Australia members as part of their annual subscription and is partly supported through birding-related advertising for accommodation, binoculars and bird tours.

== See also ==
- List of ornithology journals
