= Christmas Bird Count =

Census of birds in the Western Hemisphere

The Christmas Bird Count (CBC) is a census of birds in the Western Hemisphere, performed annually in the early Northern-hemisphere winter by volunteer birdwatchers and administered by the National Audubon Society. The purpose is to provide population data for use in science, especially conservation biology, though many people participate for recreation. The CBC is the longest-running citizen science survey in the world.

== History ==
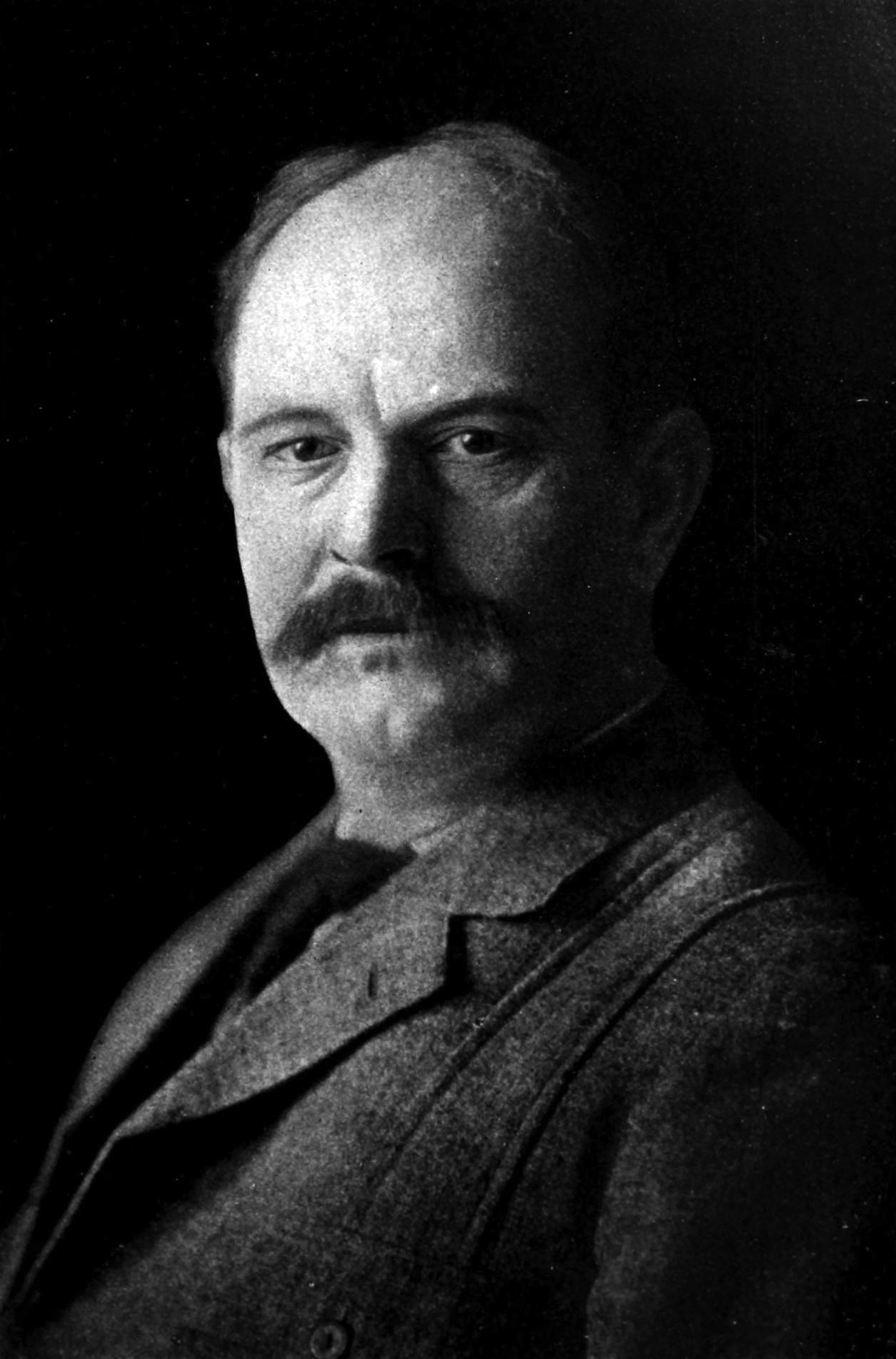
Frank Chapman, who first proposed the Christmas Bird Count.

In the 19th century, many North Americans participated in the tradition of Christmas "side hunts", in which they competed at how many birds they could kill. In December 1900, the U.S. ornithologist Frank Chapman, founder of Bird-Lore (which became Audubon magazine), proposed counting birds on Christmas instead of killing them.

On Christmas Day of that year, 27 observers took part in the first count in 25 places in the United States and Canada. The participants counted 18,500 birds in 90 species. Since then the counts have been held every winter, usually with increasing numbers of observers. The 101st count, in the winter of 2000–2001, involved 52,471 people in 1,823 places in 17 countries (but mostly in the U.S. and Canada). During the 113th count (winter 2012–2013), 71,531 people participated in 2,369 locations. The National Audubon Society partners with Bird Studies Canada, the Gulf Coast Bird Observatory of Texas (responsible for CBCs in Mexico), and the Red Nacional de Observadores de Aves (RNOA, National Network of Bird Observers) and the Instituto Alexander von Humboldt of Colombia.

The greatest number of bird species ever reported by a CBC circle in the world is 531, observed on December 21, 2013, in the Cosanga-Narupa count (previously known as the Yanayacu count) on the eastern slope of the Andes in Ecuador. The greatest number of bird species ever reported by any U.S. location in a single count is 250, observed on December 19, 2005, in the Matagorda County-Mad Island Marsh count circle around Matagorda and Palacios, Texas.

== Methods ==
Each individual count is performed in a "count circle" with a diameter of 15 miles (24 kilometres). At least ten volunteers, including a compiler to manage things, count in each circle. They break up into small parties and follow assigned routes, which change little from year to year, counting every bird they see. In most count circles, some people also watch feeders instead of following routes.

Counts can be held on any day from December 14 to January 5 inclusive.

The results, providing data on winter ranges of birds, are complementary to those of the Breeding Bird Surveys.

== See also ==
- Australian Bird Count
- BioBlitz – "24-hour inventory"
- Breeding Bird Survey
- Great Backyard Bird Count
- Tucson Bird Count
- Citizen science
