= Seabird Colony Register =

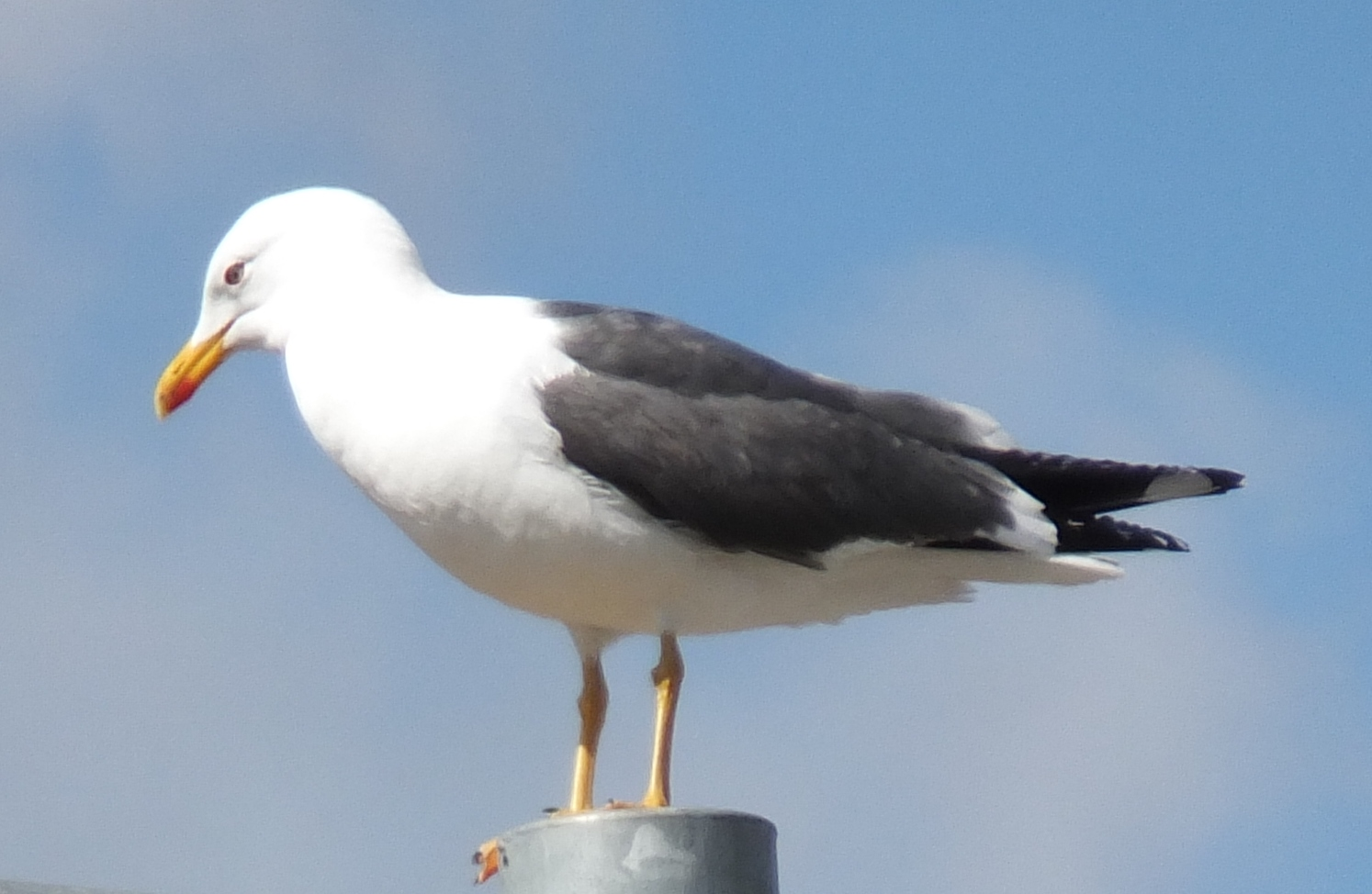
Lesser black-backed gull (Larus fuscus) in Glasgow – one of the species included in the Seabird Colony Register

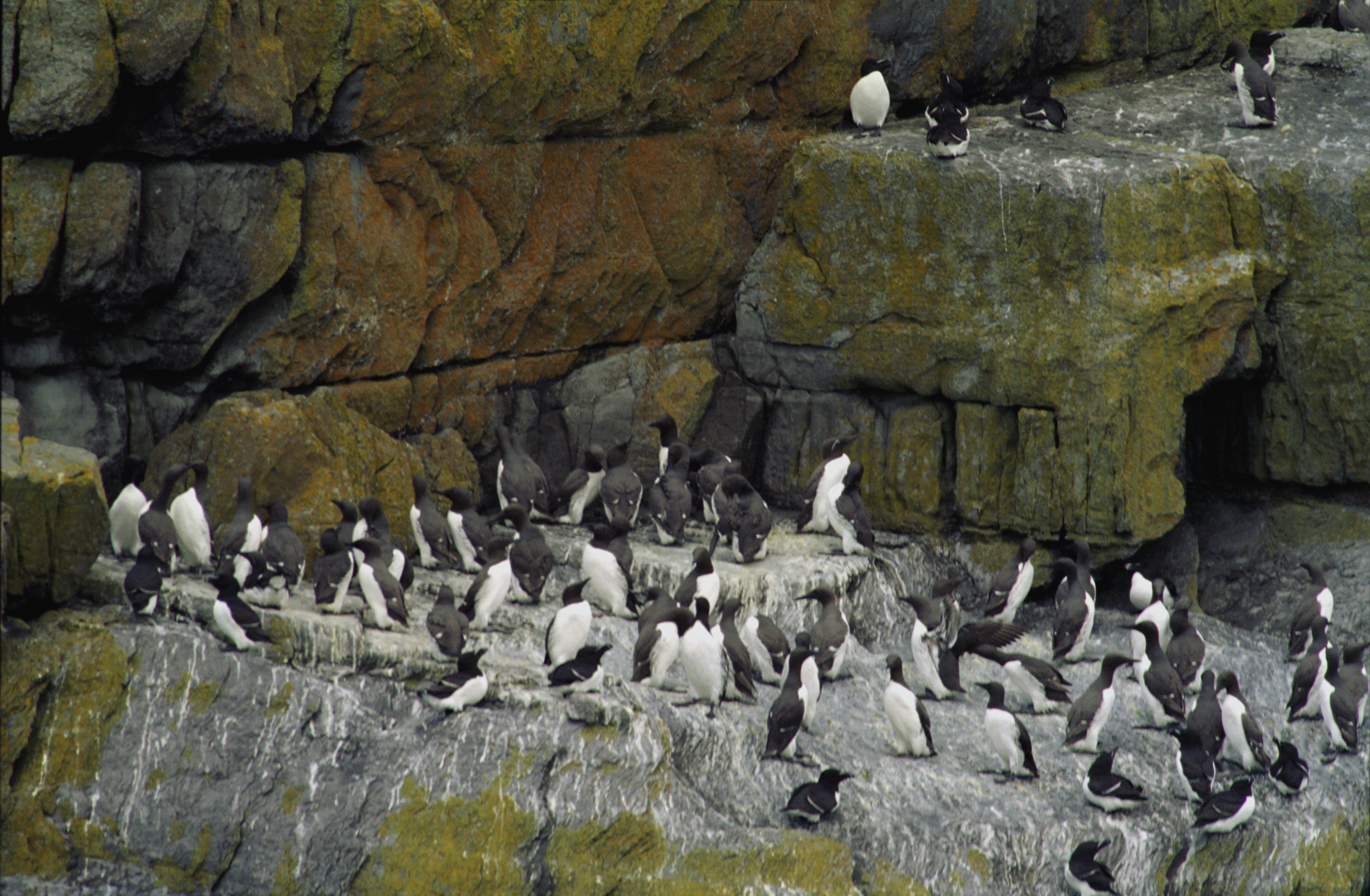
Razorbill (Alca torda) and common murre (Uria aalge) colony. Both species are included in the SCR.

The Seabird Colony Register (SCR) is a database, managed by the British Joint Nature Conservation Committee, which contains counts of breeding seabirds at British seabird colonies made between 1969 and 1998, which is used for analysing past changes in breeding seabird numbers and changes in their colony size in Britain and Ireland.

Data included in the SCR include results of two complete seabird censuses of Britain and Ireland: Operation Seafarer (1969/70) and the Seabird Colony Register Census (1985–1987), as well as ad hoc counts and counts from other surveys. Data are held for all 25 species of seabird breeding throughout Britain and Ireland.

The SCR has been partially superseded by the Seabird 2000 database.
