= Charles Foster Batchelder =

American ornithologist and naturalist

- Born: July 20, 1856; Cambridge, Massachusetts
- Died: November 7, 1954 (aged 98); Peterborough, New Hampshire
- Education: Harvard University
- Known for: Founding member of the American Ornithologists' Union and the Nuttall Ornithological Club.
- Scientific career
- Fields: Ornithology, natural history
- Workplaces: Harvard
- Author abbrev. (zoology): Batchelder

Charles Foster Batchelder (July 20, 1856 – November 7, 1954) was an American ornithologist and naturalist. He was an early member and President of the American Ornithologists' Union, and of the Nuttall Ornithological Club. He also edited The Auk, and before it, the Bulletin of the Nuttall Ornithological Club.

== Biography ==
Batchelder was born to Francis Lowell Batchelder and Susan Cabot Foster-Batchelder, and grew up next to Harvard University in Cambridge, Massachusetts. As a youngster, he developed a friendship with a number of future figures in ornithology, such as William Brewster, Henry Wetherbee Henshaw, Henry Augustus Purdie, Charles Johnson Maynard and William Earl Dodge Scott. Batchelder hardly knew his father, who had died when he was 18 months old. His sister also died at about the time he entered Harvard, having completed his studies at the local public high school.

In university, he came in contact with several leading thinkers, and had a particular admiration for Nathaniel S. Shaler and Henry L. Eustis. He graduated in 1882 with a degree in engineering science. During that time, the group of nature-inclined youth led by Brewster met at the latter's home, and these meetings would eventually evolve into the Nuttall Ornithological Club (officially in 1873), of which Batchelder became a member in 1877. Two years later he was elected vice-president before later becoming treasurer, a position he would keep for half a century.

After his graduation, he traveled and collected extensively in the Southwestern United States. He pursued a brief career in his original vocation upon his return in 1884, which only served to shake his frail health, a situation that was not helped by his subsequent travel to Europe, which lasted until 1887. His health would only be restored a few months before his return. Stuck in his oversea quarters, he worked on developing better labels and checklists.

He married Laura Poor Stone in February 1895. Of their four sons, only two survived to adulthood: Laurence and Charles Foster Jr. The family moved twice before settling at Peterborough, New Hampshire, on a farm with dilapidated lands that Batchelder used to make horticultural experiments, commenting: "there is no danger of my undertakings reaching such complete fruition that I shall be left with idle hands at the end." In the latter part of his life, the couple was renowned for their hospitality. Batchelder himself had a great capacity to analyze his fellow humans, and knew how to ask questions without antagonizing his interlocutor. He was also known for his dry wit and a habit of thinking aloud and abruptly changing subjects. In one instance he commented of another ornithologist, aged 85: "I think he is beginning to get old. I was very much tempted to give him a piece of my mind, but, under the circumstances, I think perhaps the best thing to do is to let matters slide." Batchelder's age at the time was ninety-five.

Batchelder was a founding member of the American Ornithologists' Union (AUO). He was always very keen to dispel the originally widespread impression that the AOU had originated in the Nuttall Ornithological Club. In fact, the Nuttall members were not very happy with how the Club was "rather unwillingly compelled" to transfer control of its Bulletin, which was to become The Auk, to the AOU. Despite these tensions, Batchelder served as associate editor of the new publication from 1888 to 1893, and vice-president, then President (1900–1905) of the AOU.

As editor, he was envied for his ability to obtain any amount of money necessary to maintain the publication. Within the Nuttall Club, however, he kept in the background. After the death of Brewster, who had been President almost continuously since the Club's inception, the meetings naturally transferred to Batchelder's house, but he refused to be elected even as honorary President. He also originated and hosted the annual New Year party, at least until 1949, when his increasing deafness and loss of eyesight made these too difficult. At the time, he was also handicapped following a hip fracture in 1943 that forced him to use crutches.

Although ornithology was his main interest, he also worked in botany and zoology, taking notes on, amongst other things, the activities of the hedgehogs living under his barn. He was a founding member of the New England Zoological Club in 1899, of which he published the proceedings, which Thomas Barbour characterized as "a modest but enduring monument". Although he had taken classes in the subject, he became a member of the New England Botanical Club (and thus began regular contact with established botanists) only in 1905. He would contribute much to the collection of herbarium specimens (over 5,000) from southern New Hampshire, but generally thought little of his achievements in the subject. He was elected a Fellow of the American Academy of Arts and Sciences in 1932.

Between 1934 and 1954, he was associated under one title or another with the Museum of Comparative Zoology at Harvard. He was a fellow of the American Association for the Advancement of Science. In his later life, he compiled a meticulous bibliography of C J. Maynard as a form of atonement for the harsh feelings he had developed against the man when Maynard had abandoned his functions as first editor of the Bulletin of the Nuttall Club, and became quite distressed upon learning that he had missed an item.

Wendell Taber concluded his obituary with an account of his last encounter with the man:

As I rose to leave one afternoon shortly before his death, his eyes grew suddenly large and clear with an undescribable [sic] mischievous sparkle. In a strong, ringing voice, utterly unlike his conversational intonations of the previous half hour, he called, "Glad to have known you."
