= Walter Van Fleet =

American physician and naturalist (1857–1922)

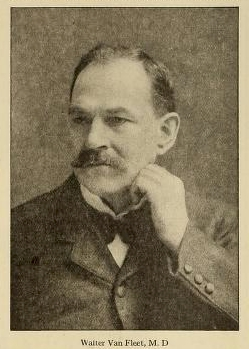
- circa. 1918
- Born: June 18, 1857; Hudson, New York, United States
- Died: January 26, 1922 (aged 64); Miami, Florida, United States
- Education: Hahnemann Medical College, Philadelphia

Walter Van Fleet (June 18, 1857 – January 26, 1922) was an American physician, horticulturalist, botanist, ornithologist and all around naturalist.

== Biography ==
Dr. Walter Van Fleet was born in Piermont, New York on June 18, 1857. When he was young, his family moved to Williamsport, Pennsylvania before settling in Watsontown, Pennsylvania.

He devoted much of his early life to the study and observation of nature. Eventually, he moved up to Boston, Massachusetts to study and collect specimen of natural history for Harvard University and for naturalists in the area. This included a collecting trip to South America for the Museum of Comparative Zoology. In 1876, the eighteen-year-old Van Fleet was published in the first issue of the Bulletin of the Nuttall Ornithological Club, the first scholastic ornithological journal in American history, then edited by Charles Johnson Maynard and Henry Augustus Purdie.

Just prior to 1880, Van Fleet returned to Pennsylvania, where he soon graduated from Hahnemann Medical College of Philadelphia (now the Drexel University College of Medicine). He maintained a medical practice for about ten years, before abandoning it for horticulture. He focused on the introducing, cultivating, and hybridizing of roses.

Twenty-nine rose cultivars were introduced by Van Fleet between 1889 and 1926. In 1921, ‘Mary Wallace’ (named after then Secretary of Agriculture Henry C. Wallace's daughter) was released. Seven years later, it was voted the number one rose in the American Rose Society's popularity poll. In addition, it won numerous medals and awards.

Van Fleet was eventually named the horticultural editor of the Rural New Yorker. From 1909 until 1922, he was the staff physiologist for the U.S. Department of Agriculture. He died in 1922 in Miami, Florida after an operation and is now buried at Watsontown Cemetery.

In 1924, the editor of the American Rose Annual, commented, "Nowhere else in the world is there going on such a systematic and orderly attempt to obtain a better rose variety for a specific purpose... He is probably the greatest plant-breeder America has yet known."

In 1929, the National Horticultural Magazine write about him, "The honor that is due those who have made the world a more beautiful place in which to live celtainly belongs to Dr. Walter Van Fleet. He was one of the greatest plant breeders this country has had and he gave especial attention to roses. From boyhood he was interested in natural history and plant growing and the products of his unremitting and painstaking energy, combined with unlimited patience, are known to garden lovers all over the country as well as in foreign lands."

Van Fleet's cultivars, 'May Queen', ‘Sarah Van Fleet’ and 'American Pillar' are still sold today and many modern cultivars include parentage from Dr. Van Fleet's work.
