= Charles B. Cory =

American ornithologist and golfer

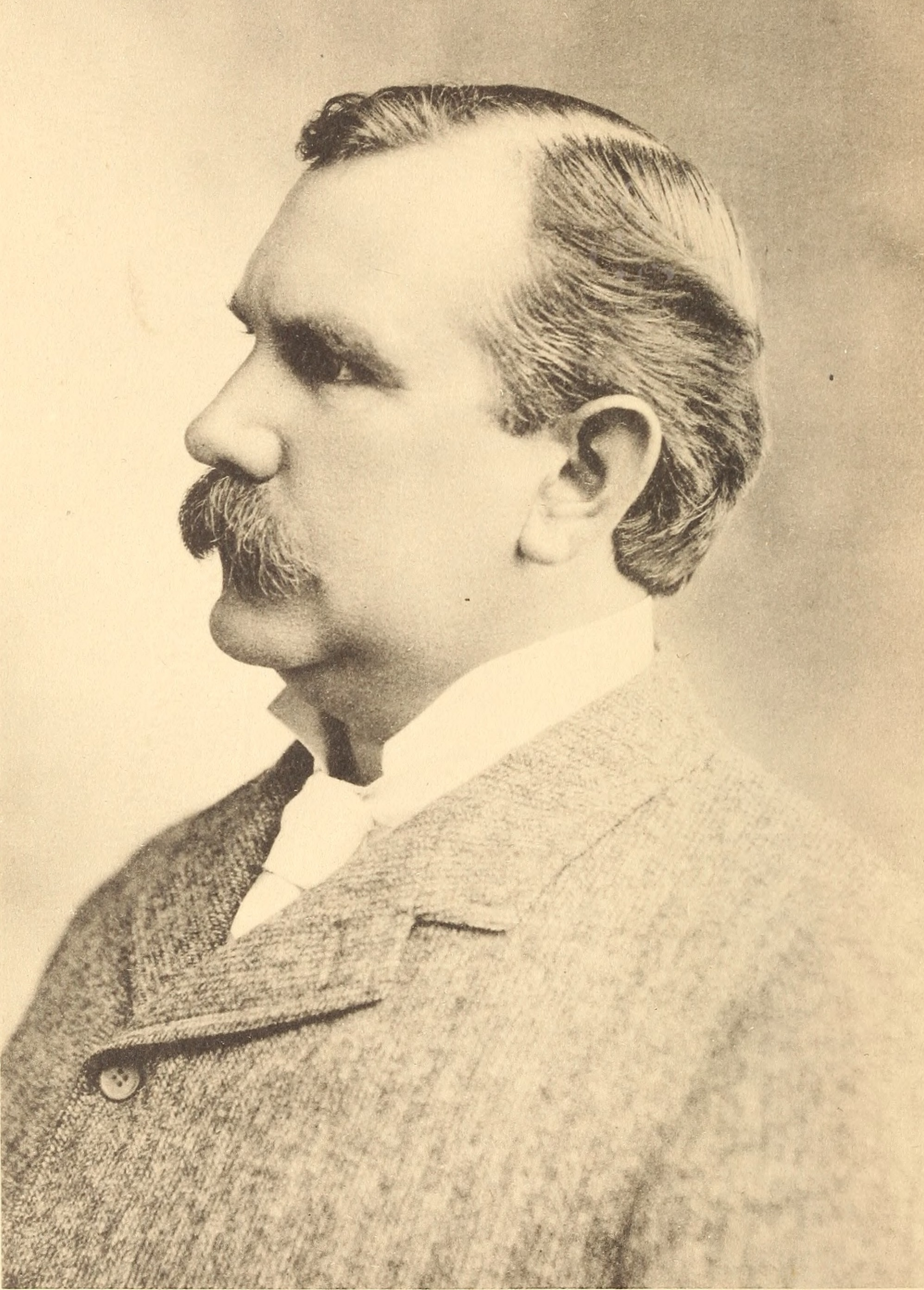
- Born: January 31, 1857; Boston, Massachusetts, US
- Died: July 31, 1921 (aged 64)
- Education: Boston University, Harvard University
- Known for: Large collection of birds
- Scientific career
- Fields: Ornithologist
- Institutions: The Field Museum, Chicago
- Author abbrev. (zoology): Cory

Charles Barney Cory (January 31, 1857 – July 31, 1921) was an American ornithologist, golfer, outdoorsman, and author.

== Early life ==
Cory was born in Boston, Massachusetts. His father had made a fortune from a large import business, ensuring that his son never had to work. At the age of sixteen Cory developed an interest in ornithology and began a skin collection. Due to his ability to travel anywhere he wished, this soon became the best collection of birds of the Caribbean and the Gulf of Mexico in existence.

In February 1876, the nineteen year old Cory was elected a member of Nuttall Ornithological Club, America's first ornithological organization. It was here that he met the leading ornithologists of Massachusetts at the time, such as William Brewster, Henry Henshaw, Ruthven Deane, Charles Johnson Maynard, with Joel Asaph Allen soon to join as well.

Starting in 1876, he briefly attended Harvard and the Boston University School of Law but soon left to continue his travelling. In 1877, he went collecting in Florida, followed by a trip to the Magdalen Islands in 1878, and another to the Bahamas the next year. In 1880, he collected in Europe, and then he returned to the West Indies in 1881.

== Career ==
In 1883, he was one of the forty-eight ornithologists invited to become founders of the American Ornithologists' Union and one of those who attended the founding convention in New York City. The next year he visited the Dakota Territory and Montana with his friend, Martin A. Ryerson, to collect specimen. The rest of the 1880s saw him in Cuba, Mexico, and Canada. In 1887, Cory was made the curator of birds at the Boston Society of Natural History.

In 1882, Cory purchased Great Island in West Yarmouth, Massachusetts as a summer retreat and game preserve, and set about the restoration of its Point Gammon Light as an ornithological observatory. While summering there on Cape Cod, Cory entertained dignitaries such as President Grover Cleveland, and frequently sponsored community sporting and cultural events.

From 1888 to 1892, he and friend Charles Richard Crane funded and played on the Hyannis town team in what is now the Cape Cod Baseball League. At Cory and Crane's expense, various well-known professional and amateur players were brought in to play alongside the Hyannis locals. In 1888, Cory outfitted his club in "suits which were of the best white flannel and red stockings," and secured the services of pitcher Dick Conway and catcher Mert Hackett, both formerly of the major league Boston Beaneaters. In 1889, Cory brought back Hackett, and also enlisted Barney Gilligan, who had played for the 1884 major league champion Providence Grays. After the 1891 season, Cory published an extended ode to his ballclub in the style of Ernest Thayer's Casey at the Bat.

When Cory's collection of 19,000 bird specimens became too large to keep in his house he donated them to The Field Museum in Chicago, and he was given the position of Curator of Ornithology. Cory's collection of 600 ornithological volumes were purchased by Edward E. Ayer in 1894, and in turn donated to the museum. Cory lost his entire fortune in 1906, and took a salaried position at the museum as Curator of Zoology, remaining there for the rest of his life. Cory made routine collecting trips in Florida and the West Indies. He sometimes financed trips for other naturalists.

Cory was a director in many corporations.

Cory wrote many books, including The Birds of Haiti and San Domingo (1885), The Birds of the West Indies (1889) and The Birds of Illinois and Wisconsin (1909). His last major work was the four-part Catalogue of Birds of the Americas, two of which were completed after his death by Carl Edward Hellmayr; Hellmayr later extended the series to 15 parts.

Cory was the first person to describe Cory's shearwater as a species. It had previously been described by Giovanni Antonio Scopoli in 1769, but he had believed it to be a race of another shearwater.

Cory participated in the 1904 Summer Olympics as a golfer. He competed in the individual event but did not finish.

== Works ==
- Birds of the Bahama islands; containing many birds new to the islands, and a number of undescribed winter plumages of North American species (Boston, 1880).
- Catalogue of West Indian birds, containing a list of all species known to occur in the Bahama Islands, the Greater Antilles, the Caymans, and the Lesser Antilles, excepting the islands of Tobago and Trinidad (Boston, 1892).
- The birds of eastern North America known to occur east of the nineteenth meridian (Field Columbian Museum, 1899).
- The birds of Illinois and Wisconsin (Chicago, 1909).
- Descriptions of new birds from South America and adjacent islands (Chicago, 1915).
- How to know the ducks, geese and swans of North America, all the species being grouped according to size and color (Little, Brown & Co., Boston, 1897).
- How to know the shore birds (Limicolæ) of North America (south of Greenland and Alaska) all the species being grouped according to size and color (Little, Brown & Co., Boston, 1897).
- Hunting and fishing in Florida, including a key to the water birds known to occur in the state (Estes & Lauriat, Boston, 1896, Nachdruck 1970).
- The mammals of Illinois and Wisconsin (Chicago, 1912).
- Montezuma’s castle, and other weird tales (1899).
- Notes on little known species of South American birds with descriptions of new subspecies (Chicago, 1917).
- Southern rambles (A. Williams & company, Boston, 1881).
- Descriptions of new birds from South America and adjacent Islands... (1915).
- Descriptions of twenty-eight new species and subspecies of neotropical birds...
- Notes on South American birds, with descriptions of new subspecies... (1915).
- Beautiful and curious birds of the world (1880).
- The birds of the Leeward Islands, Caribbean Sea (Chicago, 1909).
- The birds of the West Indies (Estes & Lauriat, Boston, 1889).
- Descriptions of apparently new South American birds (Chicago, 1916).
- Descriptions of twenty-eight new species and sub-species of neotropical birds (Chicago, 1913).
- Hypnotism and mesmerism (A. Mudge & Son, Boston, 1888).
- A list of the birds of the West Indies (Estes & Lauriat, Boston, 1885).
- A naturalist in the Magdalen Islands; giving a description of the islands and list of the birds taken there, with other ornithological notes (1878).
