= William Earl Dodge Scott =

American ornithologist and naturalist

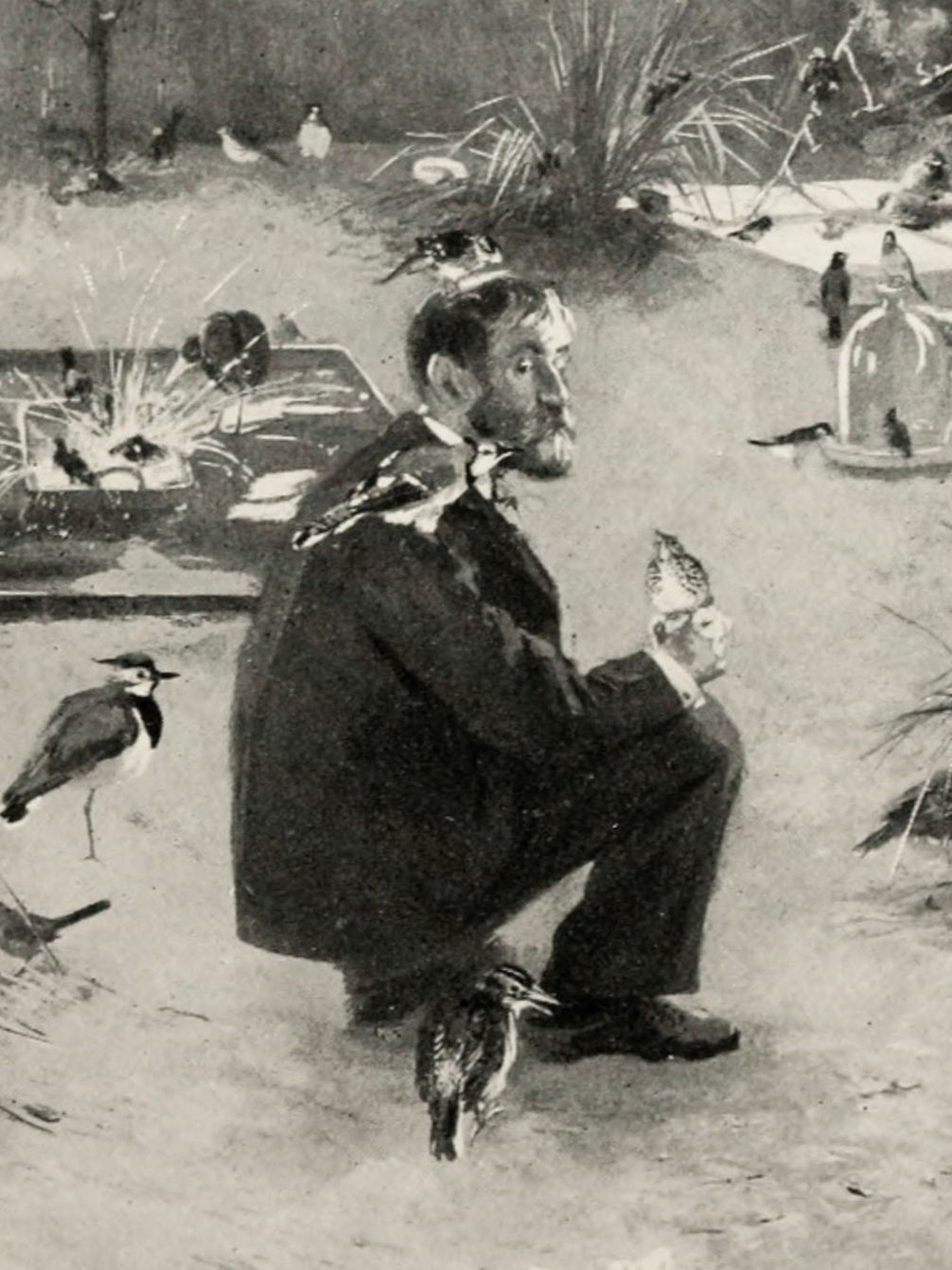
- Scott in his laboratory, by R. Bruce Horsfall
- Born: April 22, 1852; Brooklyn, New York
- Died: August 21, 1910 (aged 58); Saranac Lake, New York
- Education: Harvard University
- Scientific career
- Fields: Ornithology, natural history
- Workplaces: Princeton University

William Earl Dodge Scott (April 22, 1852 – August 21, 1910) was an American ornithologist and naturalist.

Scott was born to Moses Warren Scott and Juliet Ann Cornell. He was the grandson of notable surgeon Joseph Warren Scott. Scott, like his recent ancestors, attended university, first at Cornell University, before transferring to Harvard in Cambridge, Massachusetts to study natural history. While at Harvard, Scott befriended the young group of ornithologists, such as William Brewster, Henry Wetherbee Henshaw, Ruthven Deane, Daniel Chester French, Charles Johnson Maynard, and Henry Augustus Purdie, all of whom founded the first ornithological organization in the country, the Nuttall Ornithological Club. In 1873, he graduated from Harvard, and in 1874, he went to the Penikese Island to study natural history at the Anderson School, which was founded by the recently deceased Louis Agassiz.

After his schooling, Scott briefly headed West for a while, but ultimately returned to New York City and found work as a taxidermist until he was hired as acting curator of the museum of biology at Princeton University in 1875. In 1897, he became curator of the department of ornithology at Princeton. Throughout these years he made several collecting trips across the country and in Jamaica in search of bird specimen for the university.

He died suddenly in 1910 at his home in Saranac Lake, New York.

== Select publications ==
- Bird Studies (1897)
- The Story of a Bird Lover (1903)
- Birds of Patagonia (1903)
