= Charles Johnson Maynard =

American naturalist

- Born: May 6, 1845; Newton, Massachusetts, U.S.
- Died: October 15, 1929 (aged 84); Newton, Massachusetts, U.S.
- Known for: Founding member of the Nuttall Ornithological Club.
- Scientific career
- Fields: Ornithology, natural history, taxonomy, herpetology, taxidermy, conchology, malacology
- Author abbrev. (zoology): Maynard

Charles Johnson Maynard (May 6, 1845 – October 15, 1929) was an American naturalist and ornithologist born in Newton, Massachusetts. He was a collector, a taxidermist, and an expert on the vocal organs of birds. In addition to birds, he also studied mollusks, moss, gravestones and insects. He lived in the house at 459 Crafts Street in Newton, Massachusetts, built in 1897 and included in the National Register of Historic Places in 1996 as the Charles Maynard House. The Charles Johnson Maynard Award is given out by the Newton Conservators, Inc.

== Biography ==
Charles Johnson Maynard was born in Newton, Massachusetts, on May 6, 1845, to Samuel Maynard and Emeline Sanger. He left school at the age of 16 to help out on the family farm. His interests led him to taxidermy, and the collecting and dealing in specimens of natural history. He founded his own company in Boston, Massachusetts, called C. J. Maynard & Co. in 1865, which published books and sold naturalist supplies. Maynard eventually married Pauline Thurlow Greenwood

In 1870, at the age of 24, Maynard's Naturalist's Guide was published, becoming America's first publication on a reliable and detailed method of collecting and preserving zoological specimen. This first book was illustrated by the notable artist Edwin Lord Weeks and published by James R. Osgood & Co., formerly Ticknor and Fields. The book mentions other future leading figures in ornithology that he worked with such as William Brewster, Joel Asaph Allen, Henry Augustus Purdie and others.

Maynard was the first editor of the Nuttall Ornithological Club, the first such club in America, founded in 1873. However, he was forced to resign after he had avoided his duties in order to collect specimens during a trip. This roused the ire of his colleague Charles Foster Batchelder, who would later pay penance by compiling Maynard's extensive bibliography after Maynard's death. This event is believed to be the reason that he was excluded from the American Ornithologists' Union when it was first formed in 1883. This angered some, including Joseph Marshall Wade, the editor of the Ornithologist and Oologist, who defended Maynard as someone who studies while the other ornithologists were "toddling around in petticoats."

Maynard later managed Boston's Naturalists' Bureau, into which he merged C. J. Maynard & Co. He was president of the Newton Natural History Society, Vice President of the Nuttall Ornithologist Club of Cambridge, Massachusetts, in 1875.

Maynard died in Newton on October 15, 1929.

== Personal life ==
Charles Johnson Maynard was married twice.

In 1870, he married Pauline Thurlow Greenwood. She was the daughter of Thomas Smith Greenwood, the lighthouse keeper in Ipswich, Massachusetts, and the owner of Greenwood Farm. Her father was also a recipient of an award from the Massachusetts Humane Society. The two children of Charles and Pauline included Maude Pauline (1872-1965), who, along with George William Phypers, owned the Ohio Greenwood Farm His second marriage was to Elizabeth Cotter. They had a daughter, Pearl, who continued to live in the Charles Maynard House after her father's death.

== Eponyms and selected zoological discoveries ==
Birds:

- A subspecies of the eastern towhee, Pipilo erythrophthalmus alleni, was discovered and collected by Maynard in Florida, but cited by Elliott Coues, who named it for Joel Asaph Allen before Maynard had the chance to name it Pipilo leucopsis. (1871)
- The Ipswich sparrow, Passerculus sandwichensis princeps, which is a subspecies of the Savannah sparrow (1872)
- The recently extinct dusky seaside sparrow of Florida, Ammodramus maritimus nigrescens, (1872).
- Maynard's cuckoo, Coccyzus minor maynardi, a Caribbean subspecies of the mangrove cuckoo (1887)
- A Caribbean subspecies of the white-eyed vireo, Vireo griseus maynardi, (1887)
- A Caribbean subspecies of the hairy woodpecker, Picoides villosus maynardi, (1887)
- A Caribbean subspecies of the osprey, Pandion haliaetus ridgwayi, which he named for Robert Ridgway. (1887)
- A Bahamas subspecies of the common ground dove, Columbina passerina bahamensis, (1887)
- A subspecies of the grasshopper sparrow, Ammodramus savannarum australis, (1887)
- A Bahamas subspecies of the clapper rail, Rallus crepitans coryi, named for Charles B. Cory. (1887)
- A Jamaican subspecies of the common ground dove, Columbina passerina jamaicensis, (1888)
- A subspecies of the downy woodpecker, Picoides pubescens fumidus, (1889)
- A Florida subspecies of red-winged blackbird, Agelaius phoeniceus floridanus, (1895)
- A Bahamas subspecies of the American oystercatcher, Haematopus palliatus prattii, (1899)
- The Florida pine warbler, Setophaga pinus florida, a subspecies of the pine warbler, (1906)

Mammals:

- The Bahaman raccoon, Procyon lotor maynardi, (1898)

Butterflies:

- A Florida subspecies of the Strymon istapa (also known as the mallow scrub-hairstreak), Strymon istapa modesta, (1873)
- A Caribbean subspecies of the Gulf fritillary, Agraulis vanillae insularis, (1889)

Lizards:

- Pholidoscelis maynardi (1888)
- Anolis maynardii (1888)

Mollusks:

- Cerion nanus (1889)

== Selected publications ==
He published many books himself under his publishing company C. J. Maynard & Co. Additionally, he illustrated many of his own books. In 1951, the naturalist Charles Foster Batchelder published an extensive bibliography on the works of Maynard. Maynard's work on the mud turtle was cited in Charles Darwin's The Descent of Man in 1872, leading to a brief correspondence.

Books

- The Naturalist's Guide, w/ illustrations by E. L. Weeks. Boston: Fields, Osgood & Co. (1870)
- The Birds of Florida (issued in parts) w/ illustrations by Helen S. Farley. Salem: Naturalist's Agency. (1872)
- The Birds of Eastern North America, w/ illustrations by Maynard. Newton: C. J. Maynard & Co. (1881)
- Manual of Taxidermy Boston: S. E. Cassino & Co. (1883)
- The Butterflies of New England Boston: C. J. Maynard & Co., and Bradlee Whidden (1886, 1891)
- Eggs of North American Birds Boston: DeWolfe, Fiske & Co. (1890)
- A Manual of North American Butterflies Boston: DeWolfe, Fiske & Co. (1891)
- Handbook of the Sparrows, Finches Etc. of New England Newtonville: C. J. Maynard (1896)
- Nature Studies: Sponges West Newton: C. J. Maynard (1898)
- The Warblers of New England Newton: C. J. Maynard & Co. (1905)
- Methods in Moss Study Newton: C. J. Maynard & Co. (1905)
- Directory to the Birds of Eastern North America West Newton: C. J. Maynard (1907)
- A Field Ornithology of the Birds of Eastern North America West Newton: C. J. Maynard (1916)
- Vocal Organs of Talking Birds and Some Other Species West Newton: C. J. Maynard (1928)

Selected journal publications

- "The mottled owl in confinement" American Naturalist, April 1868
- "The dwarf thrush again" American Naturalist, Feb 1869
- "The Tennessee warbler" Newton Journal, July 31, 1869
- "The Capture of the Centronyx Bairdii at Ipswich" American Naturalist, Dec 1869
- "How the sculpted turtle deposits her eggs" American Naturalist, March 1870
- "A catalogue of the birds of Coos Co., N. H., and Oxford Co., Me." (w/ William Brewster), Proc. Boston Society of Natural History October 18, 1871.
- "Catalogue of the mammals of Florida" Bulletin of the Essex Institute, 1872
- "A new species of Passerculus from eastern Massachusetts" American Naturalist, Oct 1872
- "A new species of butterfly from Florida" American Naturalist, Mar 1873
- "The strange and rare birds of North America" American Sportsman, Mar 1873
- "Albinoism" American Sportsman, Dec 1873
- "Blue kite--everglade kite--so-for-fun-i-k-r" American Sportsman, Dec 1873
- "Supposed new species of pelican" American Sportsman, March 1874
- "A naturalist's trip to Florida" American Sportsman, April 1874
- "Orchard oriole" American Sportsman, June 1874
- "Black fish ashore on Nantucket" American Sportsman, Aug 1874
- "A naturalist on the national" American Sportsman, Aug 1874
- "More about the white pelican" American Sportsman, Aug 1874
- "A new species of finch from Florida" American Sportsman, Jan 1875
- "The Loggerhead Shrike in Mass." American Sportsman, Feb 1875
- "Bird murder--Sterna portlandica" Rod and Gun, April 1875
- "A naturalist's vacation" Rod and Gun Oct 1875
- "The common buzzard hawk of Europe in North America" Bulletin Nuttall Ornithological Club, April 1876
- "That peculiar bird" Sunday Times (Williamsport, Pa.), July 1, 1876
- "Variation in the breeding habits of certain birds", Rod and Gun Aug 1876
- "Nesting habits of the worm-eating warbler" Ornithologist and Oologist, May 1877
- "The birds of Massachusetts which are beneficial to the husbandman" The Scientific Farmer, Aug 1877
- "Albinism" Ornithologist and Oologist, Dec 1877
- "Modifications in the breeding habits of birds, caused by the persecutions of man" Familiar Science and Fanciers' Journal, Jan 1878
- "The sparrow war" The Scientific Farmer, Feb 1878
- "The anatomical structure of birds" The Scientific Farmer, Mar 1878
- "The marine leathery turtle" Familiar Science and Fanciers' Journal, April 1878
- "Name of bird" The Scientific Farmer, July 1878
- "The crow blackbird" The Scientific Farmer, Oct 1878
- "A chapter on the common garden toad, Bufo Americana" The Scientific Farmer, Nov 1878
- "The hairy woodpecker" The Scientific Farmer, Jan 1879
- "Woodpeckers" The Scientific Farmer, Feb 1879
- "The English sparrow" The Scientific Farmer, Mar 1879
- "The food of woodpeckers" The Scientific Farmer, April 1879
- "Wanderings of a naturalist" Town and Country, April 1879
- "The swallows" The Scientific Farmer, June 1879
- "The ruby-throated hummingbird Familiar Science and Fanciers' Journal, July 1879
- "Justice to the English sparrow" The Scientific Farmer, Aug 1879
- "The goatsuckers" The Scientific Farmer, Oct 1879
- "A third specimen of the swallow-tailed gull", Quarterly Journal of the Boston Zoological Society, 1882
- "Distribution of the ivory-billed woodpecker", Quarterly Journal of the Boston Zoological Society, 1882
- "Ornithological notes from the Magdalen Islands", Quarterly Journal of the Boston Zoological Society, 1882
- "Mammals of Florida", Quarterly Journal of the Boston Zoological Society, 1883
- "The hibernation of the jumping mouse", Quarterly Journal of the Boston Zoological Society, 1883
- "Notes on Colaptes auratas, containing some theories regarding variation in plumage", Quarterly Journal of the Boston Zoological Society, 1883
- "Occurrence of the Connecticut warbler in Massachusetts in spring", Quarterly Journal of the Boston Zoological Society, 1883
- "Cuban nighthawk in Florida", Quarterly Journal of the Boston Zoological Society, 1883
- "Notes on the difference between Cory's shearwater, Puffinus borealis, and the greater shearwater, Puffinus major, Quarterly Journal of the Boston Zoological Society, 1883
- "Occurrence of the white heron at Quincy, Mass.", Quarterly Journal of the Boston Zoological Society, 1883
- "Notes on the breeding habits of the American Flamingo, etc.", Naturalist in Florida, Sept. 1884
- "The curled-tailed lizard", Naturalist in Florida, Sept. 1884
- "Remarkable birds of Florida -- The white pelican", Naturalist in Florida, Sept. 1884
- "Remarkable birds of Florida -- Roseate spoonbill", Naturalist in Florida, Nov. 1884
- "Peculiar plumage of the Florida white-billed nuthatch", Naturalist in Florida, Nov. 1884
- "Brewster's Notes on the Birds of the Gulf of St. Lawrence", Naturalist in Florida, Nov. 1884
- "Abnormal plumage of the black-polled warbler", Naturalist in Florida, Nov. 1884
- "Instructions to naturalists. How to make bird skins.", Naturalist in Florida, Nov. 1884
- "Rattlesnakes", Naturalist in Florida, Nov. 1884
- "Catalogue of Bahama birds' skins, nests, and eggs", 1884
- "Remarkable Birds -- Bahama Woodpecker", Naturalist in Florida, Mar. 1885
- "Description of some new North American birds by Robert Ridgway", Naturalist in Florida, Mar. 1885
- "Notes on the Greater and Lesser Snow Geese by Robert Ridgway", Naturalist in Florida, Mar. 1885
- "Ridgway on the North American Crossbills of curvirostra type", Naturalist in Florida, Mar. 1885
- "Names of Florida animals, trees, etc., in Seminole", Naturalist in Florida, Mar. 1885
- "Chats about birds", Naturalist in Florida, Mar. 1885
- "Notes on the color of the bill in two species of terns in autumn", Naturalist in Florida, Mar. 1885
- "Remarkable Birds -- Black and white shore finch", Naturalist in Florida, May 1885
- "The whip-poor-will", Naturalist in Florida, May 1885
- "Breeding habits of the bridled tern", Young Ornithologist (Boston), May 1885
- "Instructions to naturalists. How to prepare specimen.", The Naturalist, Sep. 1885
- "The hairy woodpecker", The Naturalist, Sep. 1885
- "Six months in the Bahamas", The American Exchange and Mart and Household Journal, 1886
- "Descriptions of five new species of birds from the Bahamas", The American Exchange and Mart and Household Journal, Jan 1887
- "Notes on the white ant, found on the Bahamas", Psyche, Sept.-Oct. 1888
- "Notes on the anatomical structure of the crowned crane", Ornithologist and Oologist, Feb. 1889
- "Description of a supposed new species of gannet", Ornithologist and Oologist, Mar. 1889
- "Monograph of the genus Strophia", Contributions to Science, April 1889
- "Description of an apparently new species of warbler from Jamaica", Contributions to Science, April 1889
- "The defensive glands of a species of Phasma from Florida", Contributions to Science, April 1889
- "The sterno-trachealis as a vocal muscle", Contributions to Science, April 1889
- "Peculiar structure of the caecum of a leaf-eating lizard", Contributions to Science, April 1889
- "Notes on some Jamaica birds", Contributions to Science, April 1889
- "Reptiles and batrachians from the Caymans and the Bahamas by Samuel Garman", Contributions to Science, April 1889
- "An eel from the Marshall Islands by Samuel Garman", Contributions to Science, April 1889
- "Descriptions of a new sub-species of Poocaetes from Oregon by GS Miller, Jr.", Contributions to Science, April 1889
- "Description of supposed new birds from western North America and Mexico by William Brewster", Contributions to Science, April 1889.
- "Description of two supposed new sub-species of birds from Vancouver's Island", Ornithologist and Oologist, April 1889
- "Observation on Cory's gannet", Ornithologist and Oologist, April 1889
- "The southern yellow-winged, or grasshopper sparrow", Ornithologist and Oologist, April 1889
- "Singular effects produced by the bite of a short-tailed shrew", Contributions to Science, July 1889
- "The vocal organs of the American bittern", Contributions to Science, July 1889
- "Notes on the anatomical structure of the crowned crane" Contributions to Science, July 1889
- "On the probable evolution of the totipalmate birds, pelicans, gannets, etc.", Contributions to Science, July 1889
- "Description of a new species of butterfly from the West Indies", Contributions to Science, July 1889
- "Notes on the black snake, Bascanion constrictor", Contributions to Science, July 1889
- "Young muskrats", Contributions to Science, July 1889
- "Florida burrowing owl", Ornithologist and Oologist, Aug 1889
- "The tongue of woodpeckers", Bulletin Newton Natural History Society, Oct 1889
- "The arrow-headed warbler of Jamaica", Bulletin Newton Natural History Society, Oct 1889
- "Evolution of species" Bulletin Newton Natural Historical Society, Feb 1890
- "Correlative characters in animals Bulletin Newton Natural Historical Society, April 1890
- "Are the changes in the common names by the A. O. U. popular?", Ornithologist and Oologist, June 1890
