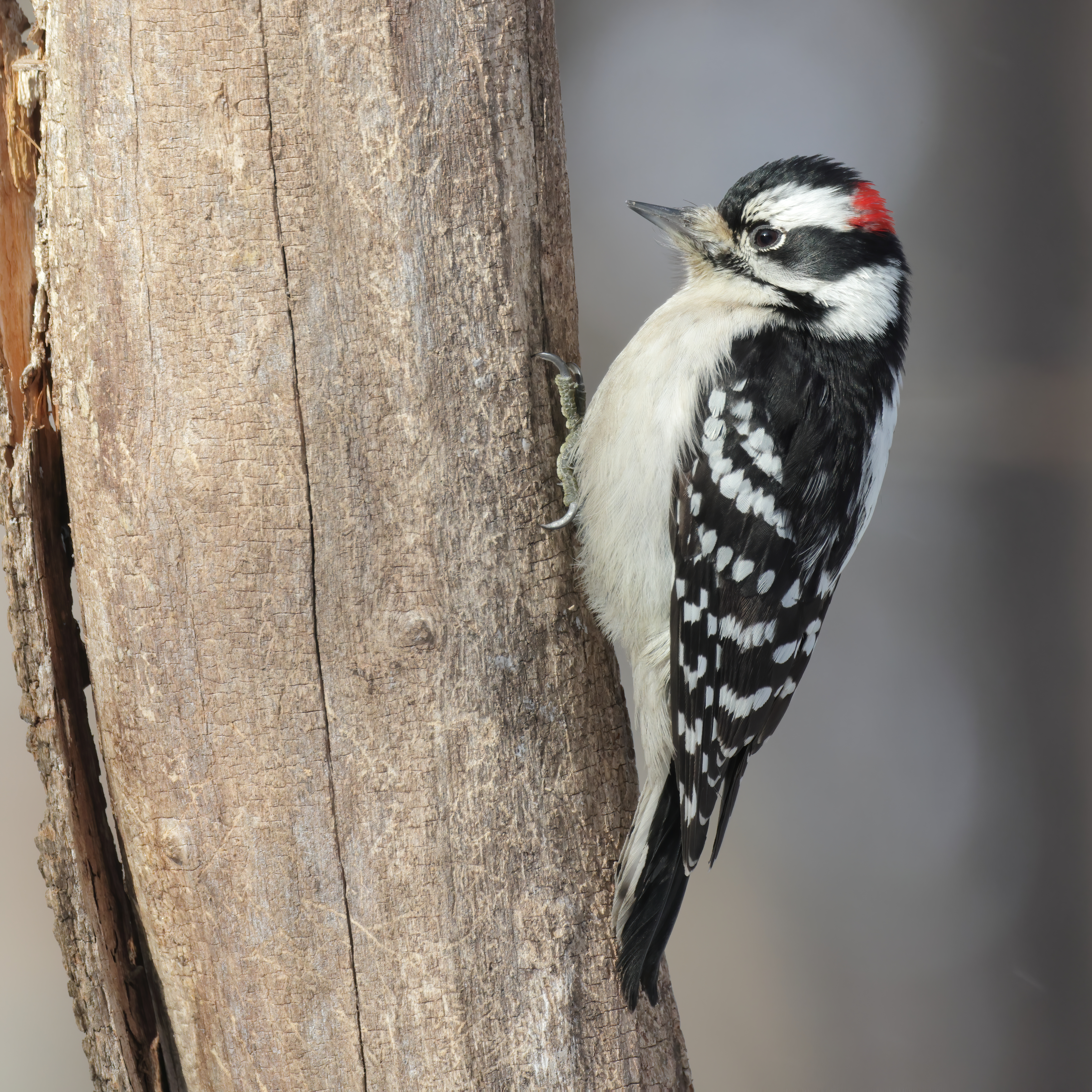
- Male
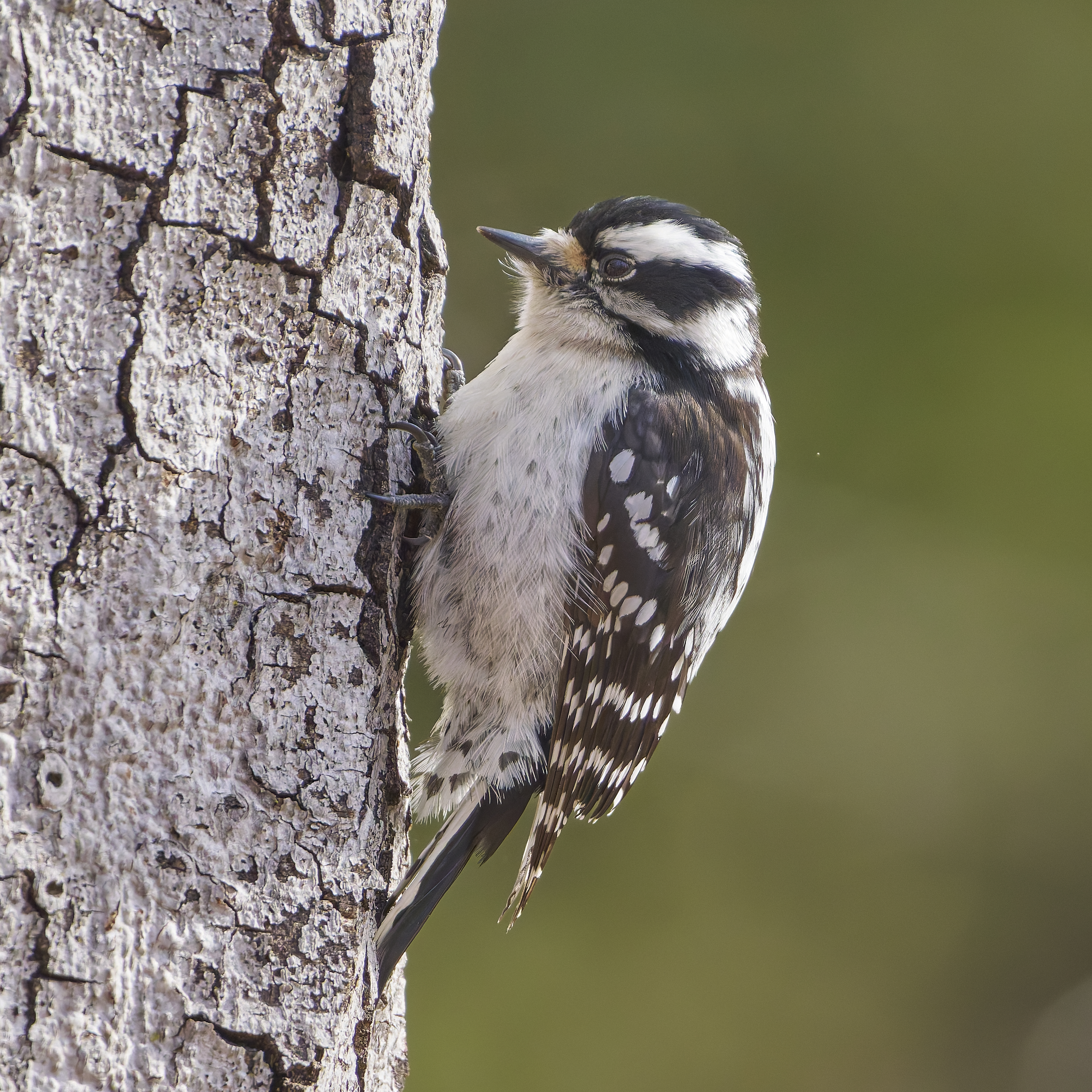
- Female

Conservation status
- Least Concern (IUCN 3.1)

Scientific classification
- Kingdom: Animalia
- Phylum: Chordata
- Class: Aves
- Order: Piciformes
- Family: Picidae
- Genus: Dryobates
- Species: D. pubescens

Binomial name
- Dryobates pubescens (Linnaeus, 1766)
- Approximate distribution map Year-round

Synonyms
- Picus pubescens Linnaeus, 1766; Picoides pubescens (Linnaeus, 1766)

= Downy woodpecker =

Species of woodpecker

The downy woodpecker (Dryobates pubescens) is a species of woodpecker, the smallest in North America. Its length ranges from 14 to 18 cm (5.5 to 7.1 in). Downy woodpeckers primarily live in forested areas throughout the United States and Canada, with the exception of deserts in the southwest and the northern tundra. The bird nests in tree cavities and feeds primarily on insects, although it supplements its diet with seeds and berries. The downy woodpecker is very similar in appearance to the hairy woodpecker, although they are not closely related.

== Taxonomy ==
The downy woodpecker was described and illustrated with a hand-coloured plate by English naturalist Mark Catesby in his The Natural History of Carolina, Florida and the Bahama Islands, which was published between 1729 and 1732. When in 1766, Swedish naturalist Carl Linnaeus updated his Systema Naturae for the 12th edition, he included the downy woodpecker, coined the binomial name Picus pubescens and cited Catesby's book. The specific epithet pubescens is the Latin for "pubescent" or "downy". Linnaeus specified the type locality as America septentrionali (North America), but the locality is now restricted to South Carolina.

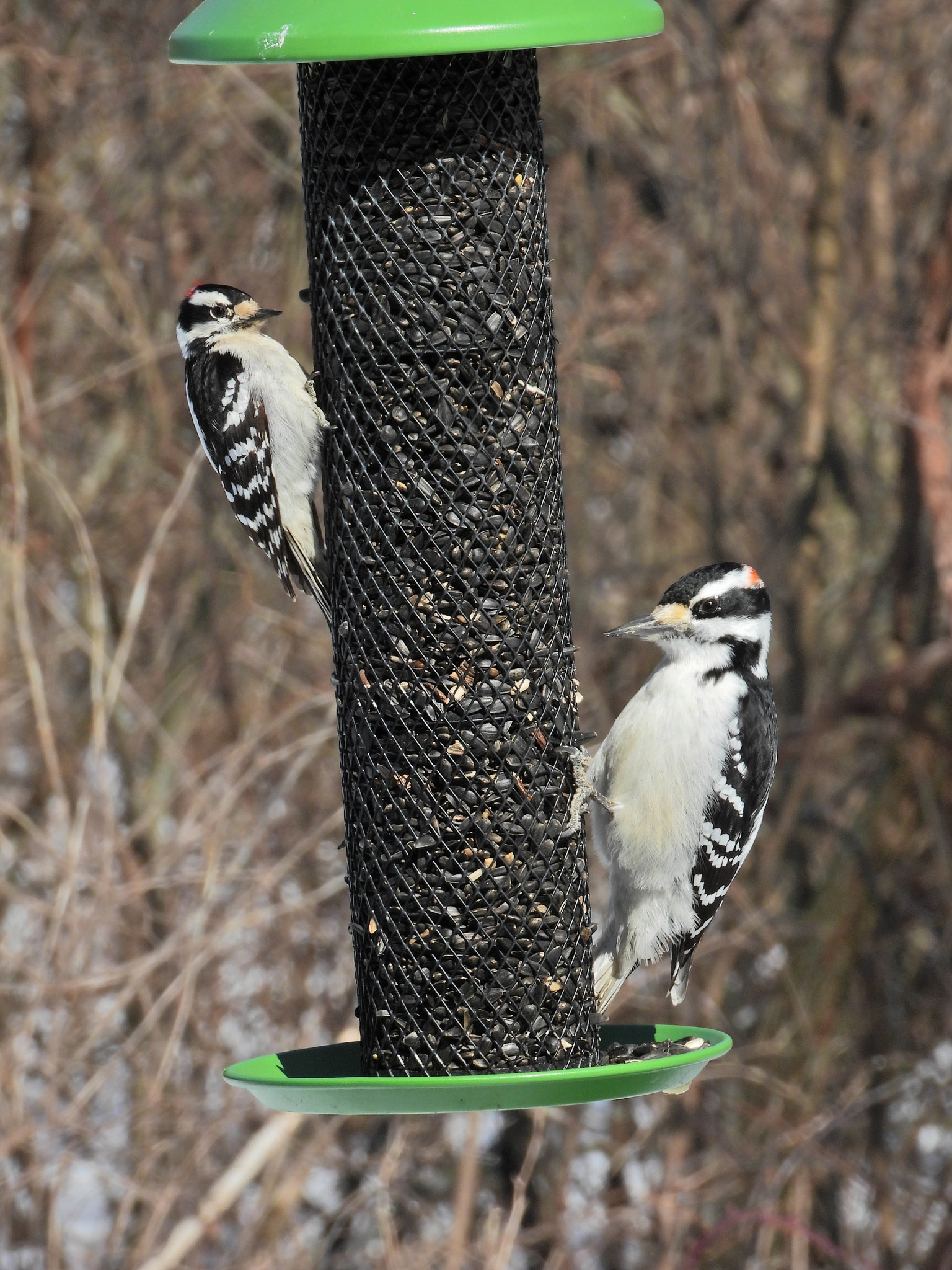
Downy woodpecker and hairy woodpecker at a feeder in Ontario, Canada

Historically, the downy woodpecker was usually placed in either Dendrocopos or Picoides, but a molecular phylogenetic study published in 2015 found that these genera did not form monophyletic groups. In the revised generic classification, the downy woodpecker was placed with four other species in the resurrected genus Dryobates, that had been erected in 1826 by German naturalist Friedrich Boie, with the downy woodpecker as the type species. Within the genus, the downy woodpecker is sister to a clade containing Nuttall's woodpecker (Dryobates nuttalli) and the ladder-backed woodpecker (Dryobates scalaris).

Despite their close resemblance, the downy and hairy woodpeckers are not very closely related; the outward similarity is an example of convergent evolution. Why they evolved this way cannot be explained with confidence; it may be relevant that the species' exploit rather differently sized foodstuffs and do not compete very much ecologically.

Seven subspecies are recognized:

- D. p. glacialis (Grinnell, 1910) – southeast Alaska
- D. p. medianus (Swainson, 1832) – central Alaska to east Canada and central and east USA
- D. p. fumidus (Maynard, 1889) – southwest Canada and west Washington
- D. p. gairdnerii (Audubon, 1839) – west Oregon to northwest California
- D. p. turati (Malherbe, 1860) – central Washington to central California
- D. p. leucurus (Hartlaub, 1852) – Rocky Mountains (southeast Alaska to southwest USA)
- D. p. pubescens (Linnaeus, 1766) – southeast USA

== Distribution and habitat ==
Downy woodpeckers are native to forested areas, mainly deciduous, of North America. Their range consists of most of the United States and Canada, except for the deserts of the southwest and the tundra of the north. Mostly permanent residents, northern birds may migrate further south; birds in mountainous areas may move to lower elevations.

== Description ==
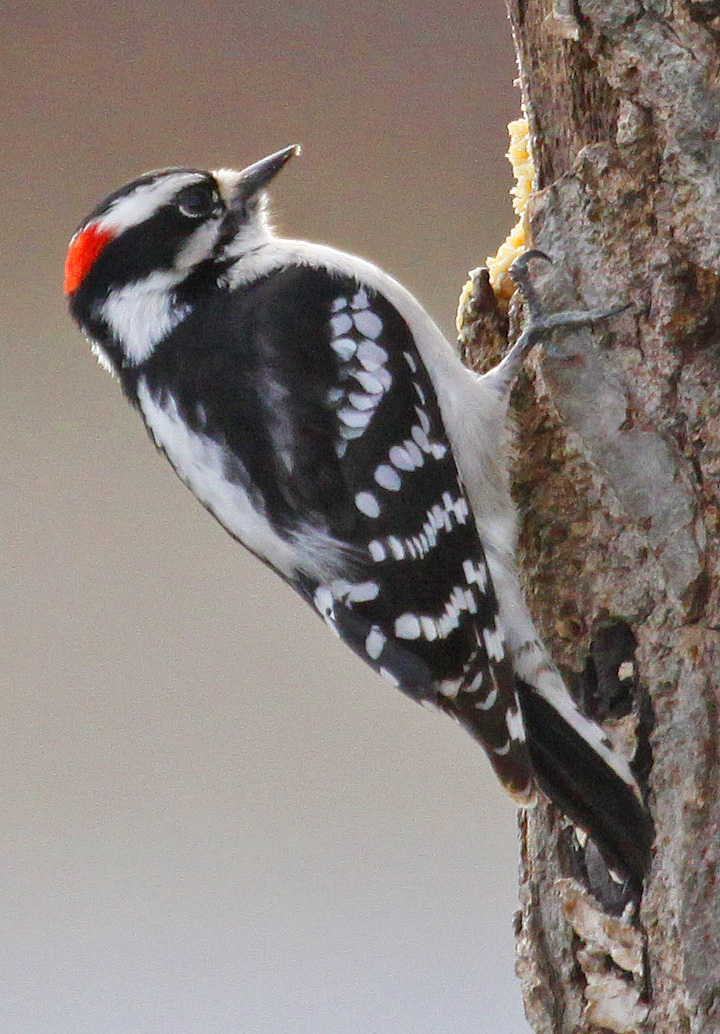
Male

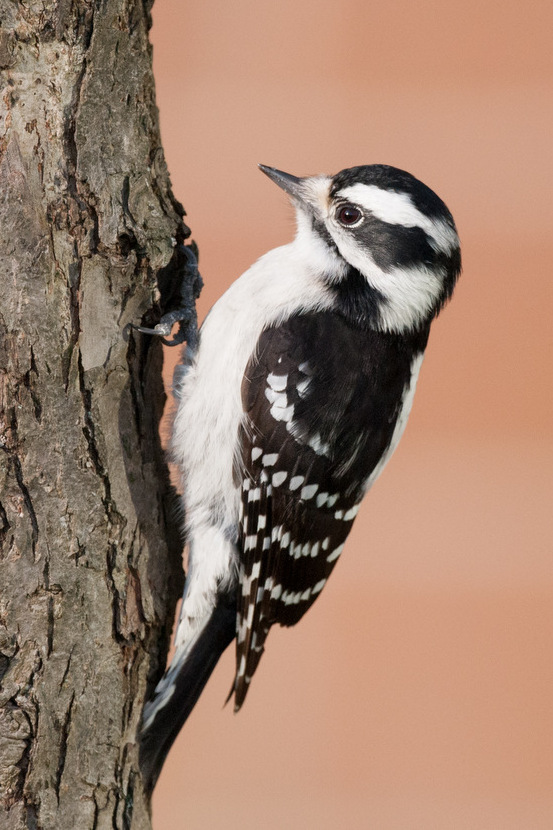
Female

Adult downy woodpeckers are the smallest of North America's woodpeckers, but many smaller species occur elsewhere, especially the piculets. The total length of the species ranges from 14 to 18 cm (5.5 to 7.1 in) and the wingspan from 25 to 31 cm (9.8 to 12.2 in). Body mass ranges from 20 to 33 g (0.71 to 1.16 oz). Standard measurements are: Wing chord is 8.5–10 cm (3.3–3.9 in), tail 4–6 cm (1.6–2.4 in), bill 1–1.8 cm (0.39–0.71 in), and tarsus 1.1–1.7 cm (0.43–0.67 in). The downy woodpecker is mainly black on the upperparts and wings, with a white back, throat, and belly and white spotting on the wings. One white bar is above the eye and one is below. It has a black tail with white outer feathers barred with black. The adult male has a red patch on the back of his head, whereas the juvenile male displays a red cap.

The downy woodpecker is virtually identical in plumage pattern to the larger hairy woodpecker, but it can be distinguished from the hairy by the presence of black spots on its white tail feathers and the length of its bill. The downy woodpecker's bill is shorter than its head, whereas the hairy woodpecker's bill is roughly equal to head length.

=== Vocalization ===
Drumming
A downy woodpecker drumming in Minnesota: A distant woodpecker is drumming in response, and other birds can be heard in the background.

The downy woodpecker gives a number of vocalizations, including a short pik call. The rattle call is a short burst that sounds similar to a bouncing ball, while that of the hairy woodpecker is a shorter burst of the same amplitude. Like other woodpeckers, it also produces a drumming sound (sounds like four taps ) with its beak as it pecks into trees. Its drums are slower compared to other North American species.

== Behaviour and ecology ==
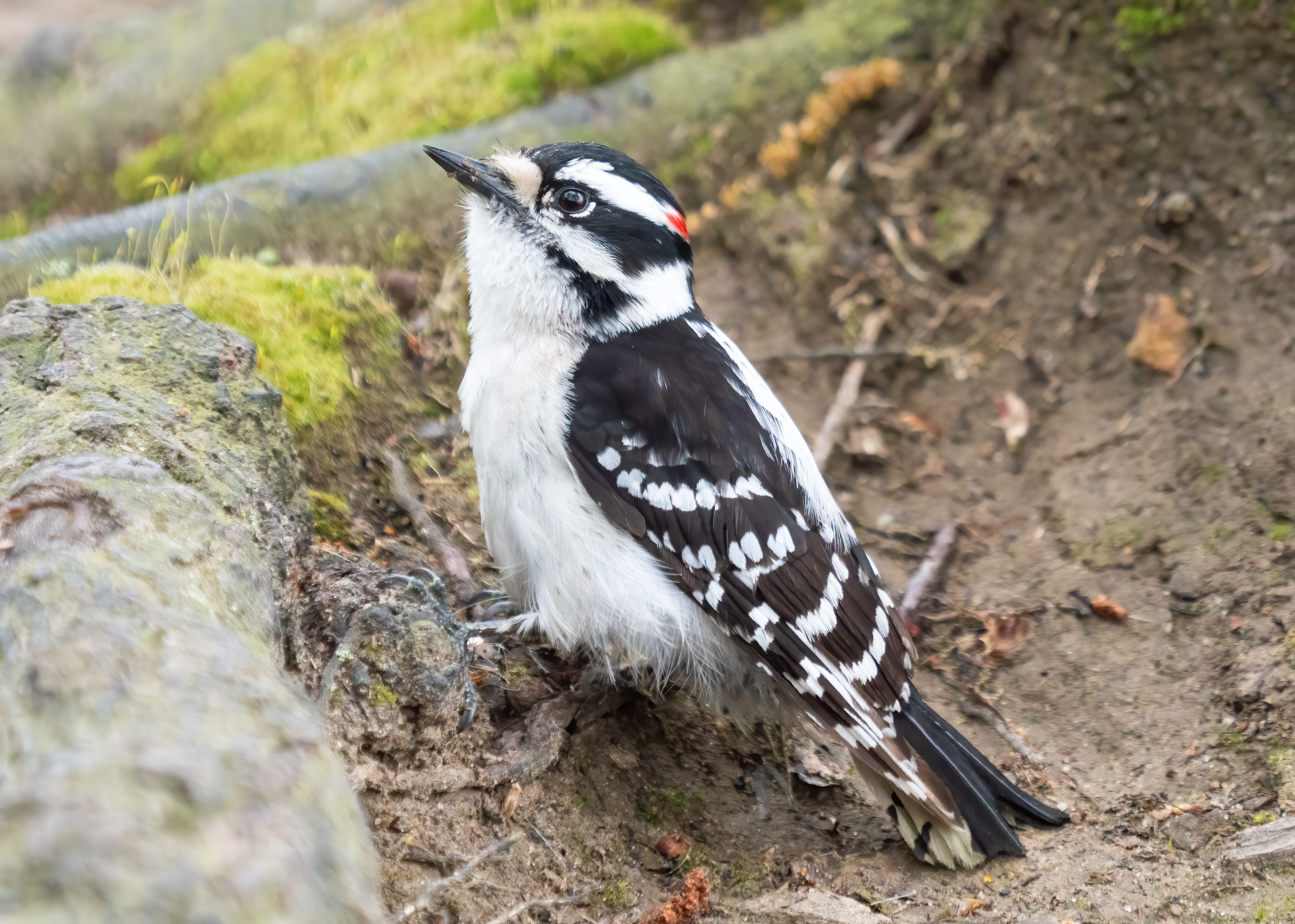
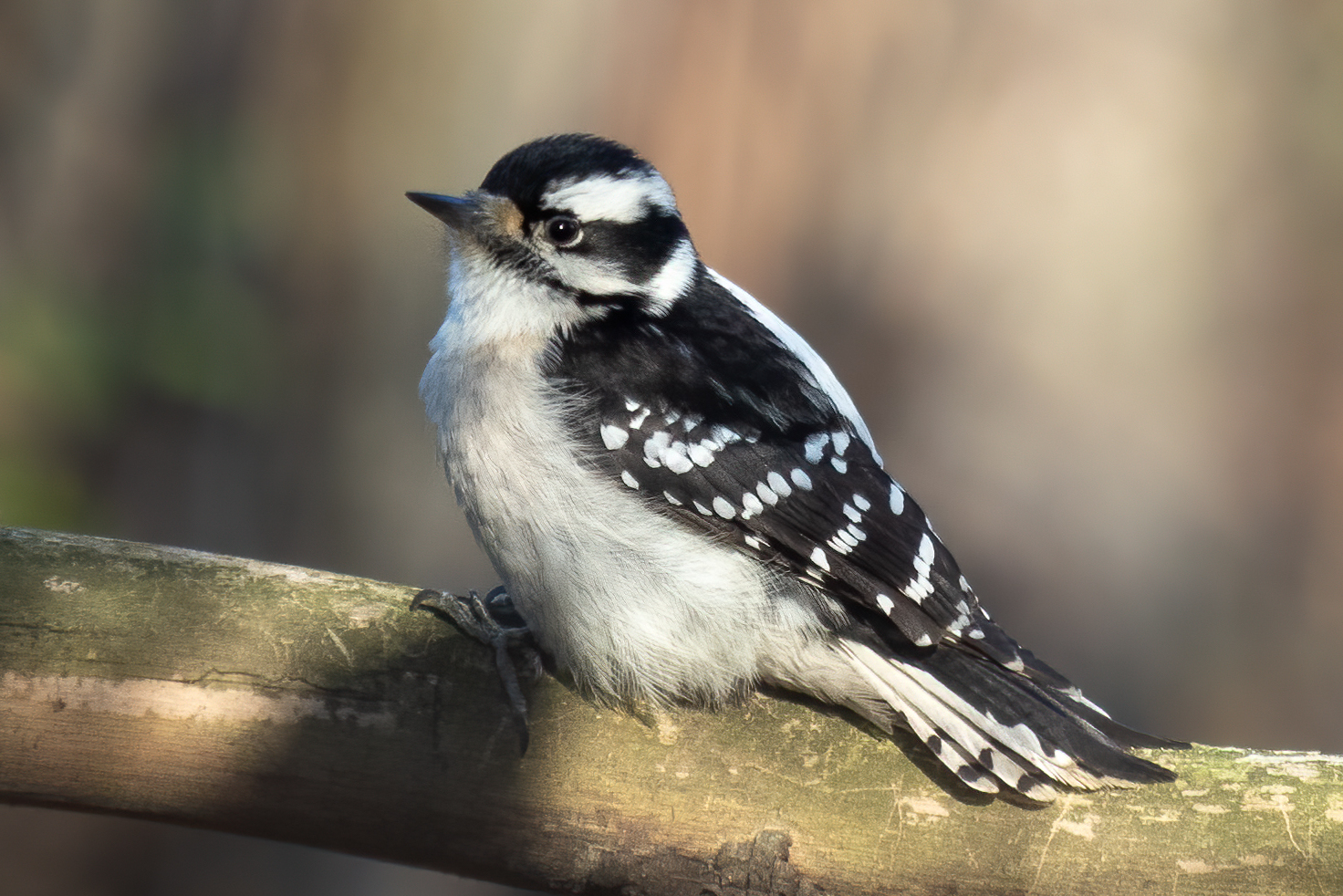
Male (top) and female (bottom), in New York City

Downy woodpeckers nest in a tree cavity excavated by the nesting pair in a dead tree or limb. In the winter, they roost in tree cavities. They tend to nest near soft snags, where the wood is softer and the inner heartwood of the tree can be accessed more easily. The woodpecker forms a nest cavity in the softer heartwood, and its nest is protected by the outer portion of the tree, the harder sapwood, which serves as protection from the elements and predators. Heartwood is often softer in dead or decayed trees, as a result, the number of dead trees in a forest and downy woodpeckers habitats are positively correlated in studies. Downy woodpeckers prefer to nest in areas with ample light, leading them to favor trees with broader leaves, such as poplars, birches, and ashes, or forest openings and edges.

=== Diet ===
Downy woodpeckers forage on trees, picking the bark surface in summer and digging deeper in winter. They mainly eat insects, but they also feed on seeds and berries. They are a natural predator of the European corn borer, an invasive moth that costs the US agriculture industry more than $1 billion annually in crop losses and population control. In winter, especially, downy woodpeckers can often be found in suburban backyards with mature trees where they feed on suet and shelled peanuts provided by mesh birdfeeders.

Feeding on suet

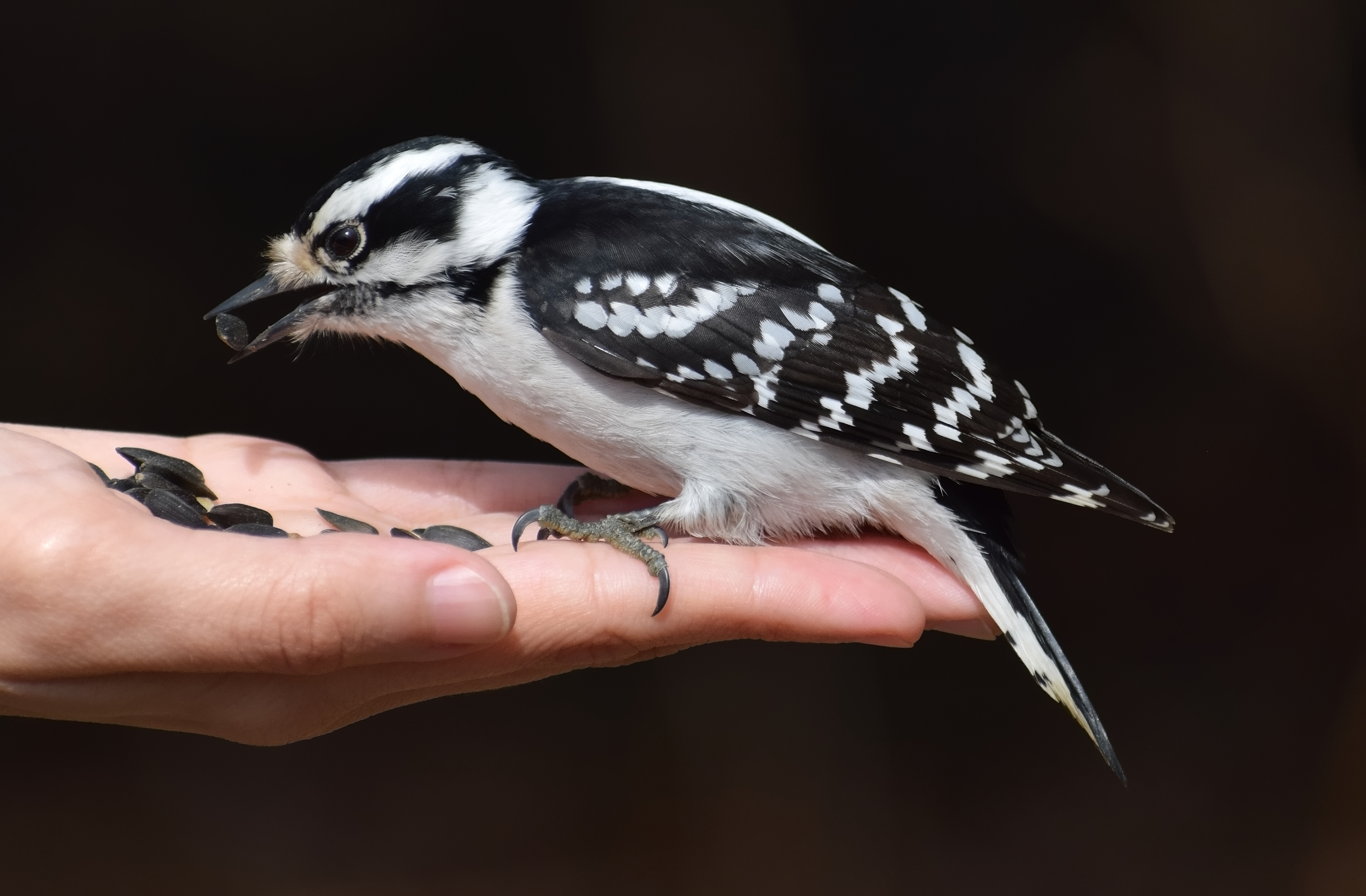
Female feeding on sunflower seeds

Foraging at Fresh Pond in Cambridge, MA

== Reproduction ==
Feeding chicks in New York City, USA

Downy woodpeckers start breeding in their first possible season and return to a site near where they were born. They breed every year of their mature life, possibly returning to the same nest holes that they used in years prior. Barring the presence of an existing hole, downy woodpeckers create a cavity in a tree roughly 2.4 to 15.3 m (8 to 50 ft) above the ground, with the male woodpecker pecking the hole for roughly half of the daylight hours, in 20-minute work sessions. The nest hole takes about 2 to 3 weeks to create, and normally measures 12 to 15 cm wide and about 20 to 30 cm deep.

A female typically lays four or five white eggs, but can lay up to seven. During waking hours, both birds incubate the eggs for 15-minute periods, in alternating shifts. At night, the male woodpecker typically rests on the eggs for their continued warmth. This incubation period lasts for about 12 days. When the eggs hatch, the infant woodpeckers weigh about 1.6 grams, which increases to around 3.2 grams over the course of its first day of life. They appear fully grown by day 17 or 18.

These younger birds are demarcated by tinted red crowns for the males, and striped or white-dotted crowns for the females. Eventually, these crowns turn jet black after they finish moulting in summer. The young males also gain a bright red dot on the back of their heads once they reach adulthood. The adult birds begin to moult earlier than their young. This process starts when the young still occupy the nest, ultimately culminating with replacement of the two strongest, central feathers, which are maintained to retain the bird's climbing power during the 2-month moult period. When the moulting ends in September, their plumage has a slight yellow tinge.

== Gallery ==
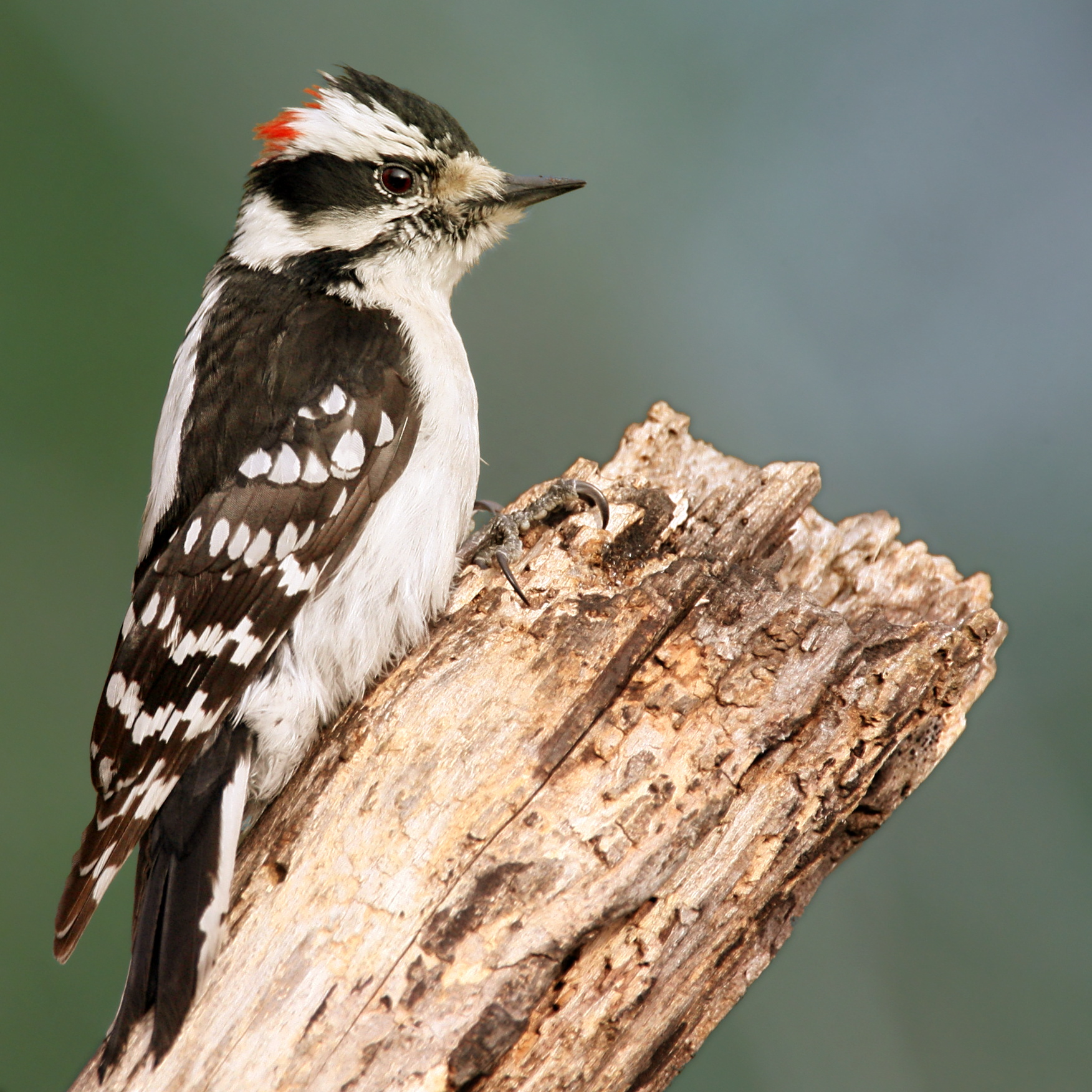
Male, in New York

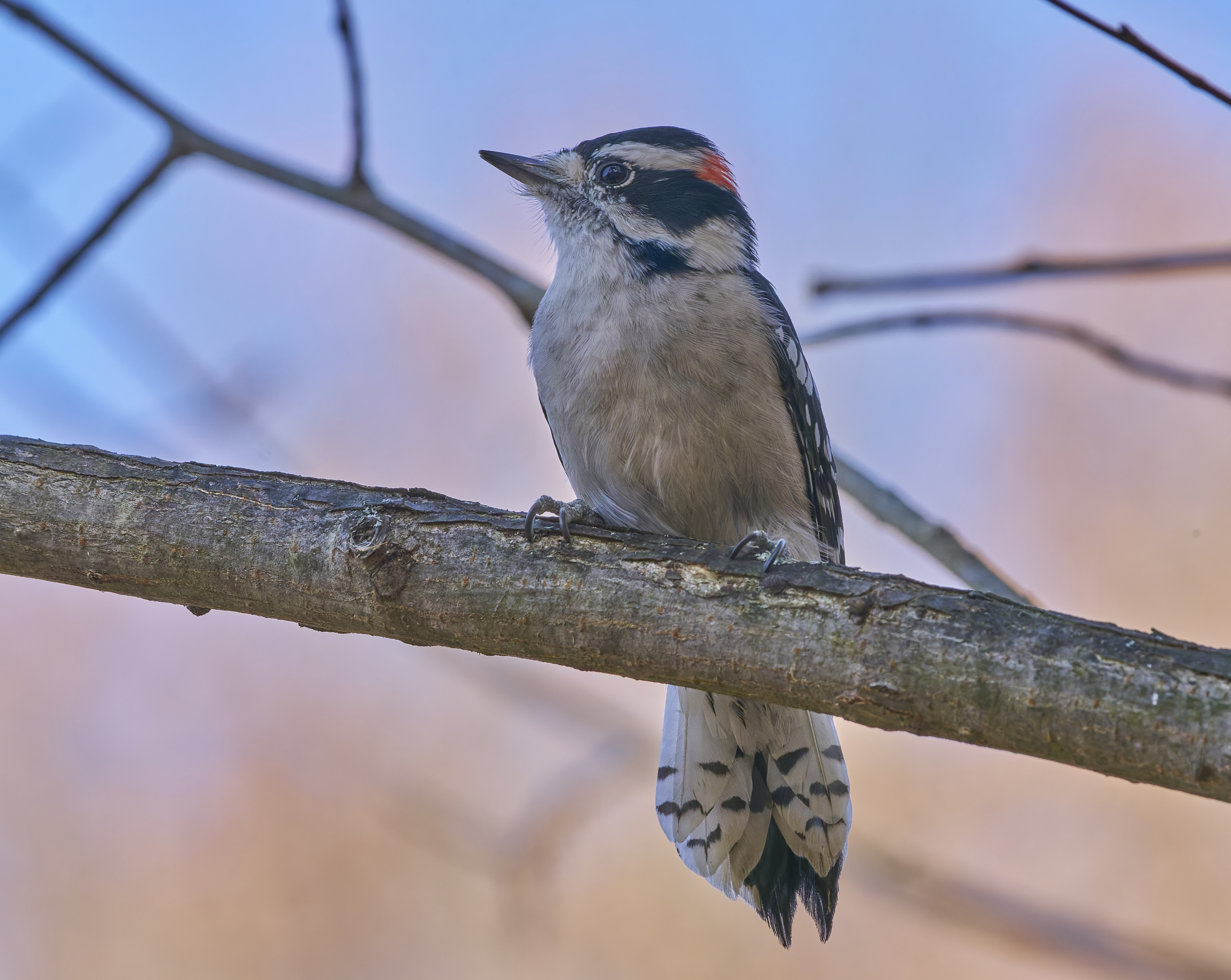
Male showing the tail's underside, in Connecticut

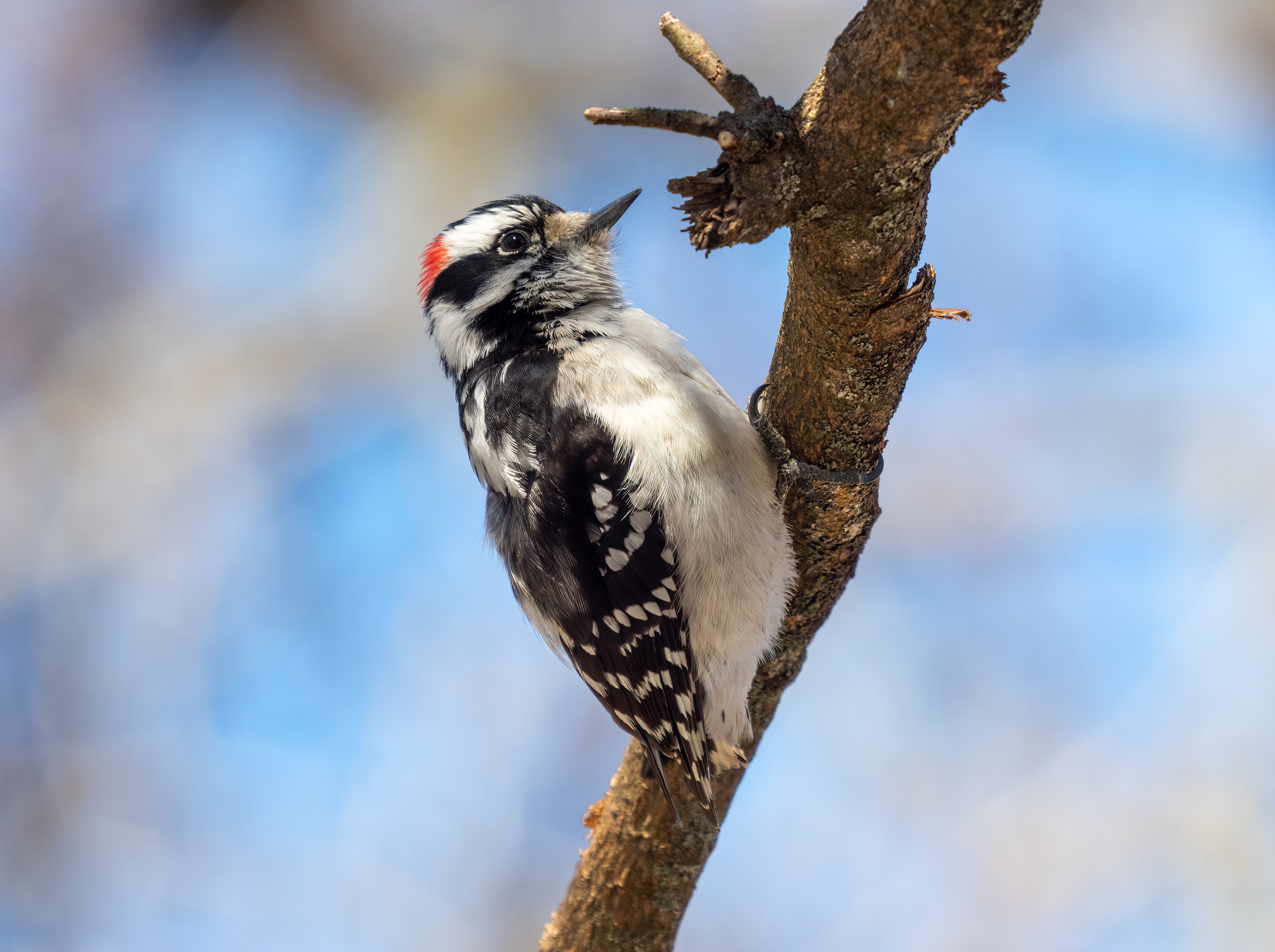
Male without tail feathers, in New York City

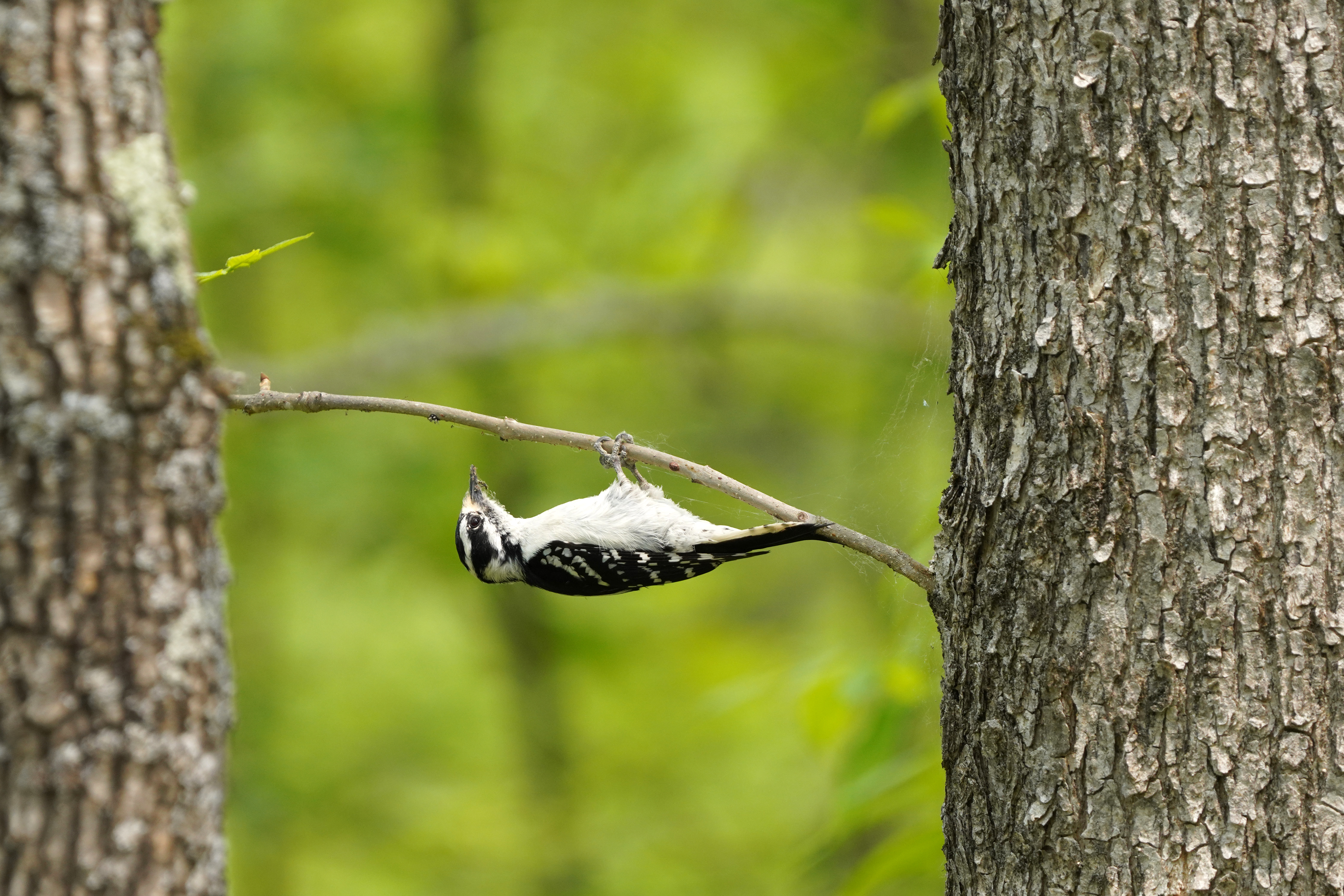
Hanging upside down

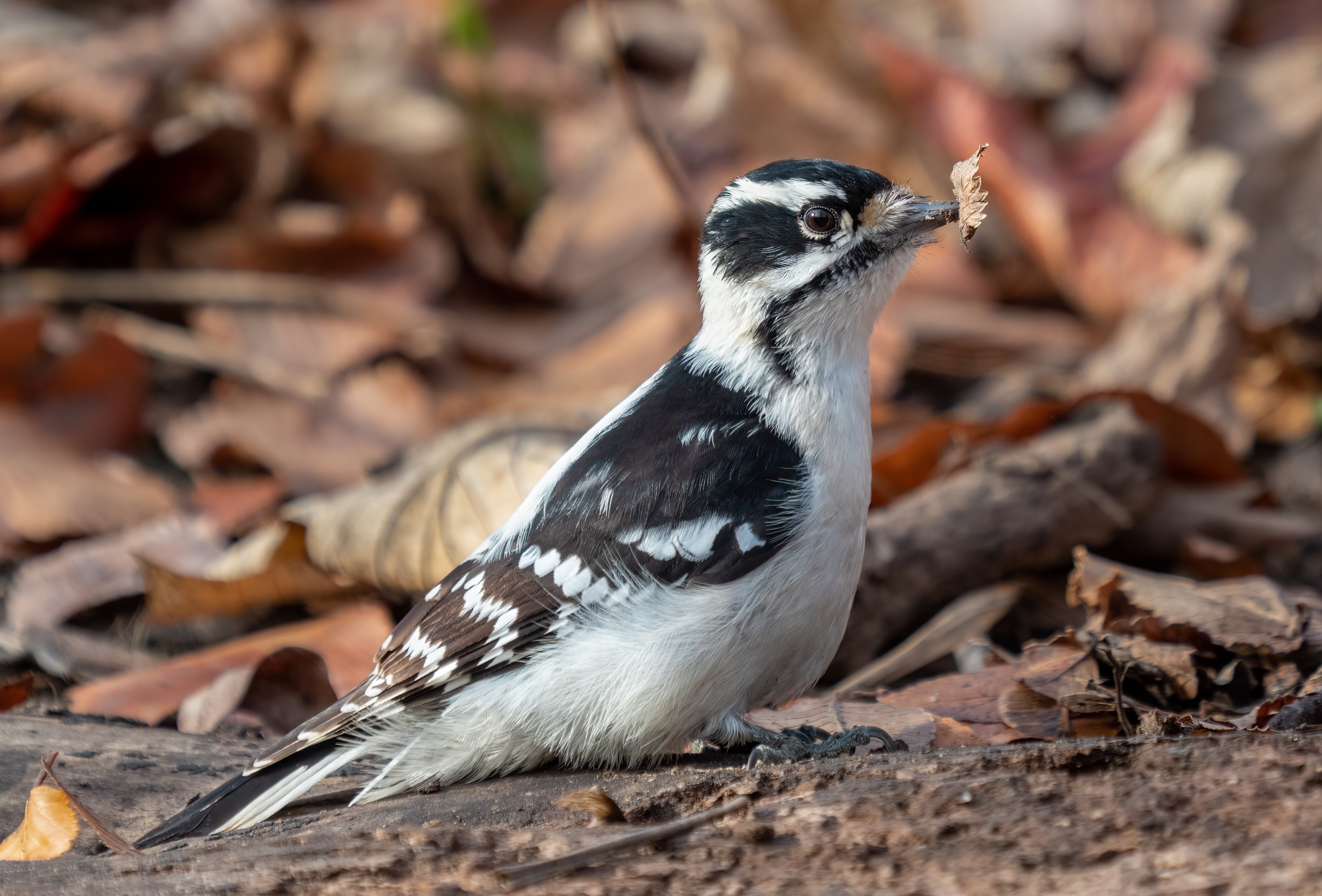
Female with a leaf caught on her bill in New York City

Bobbing, in Prospect Park, Brooklyn, New York, USA

Female, in Quebec, Canada
