= Charles Maynard House =

Historic house in Massachusetts, United States

- U.S. National Register of Historic Places
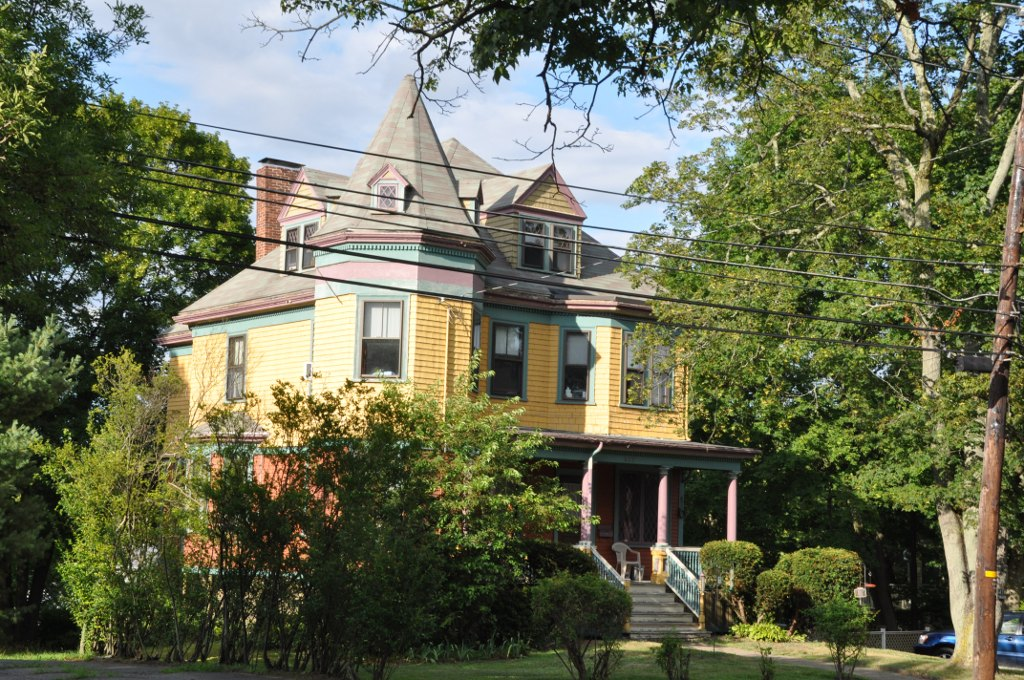

- Location within Massachusetts Location within the United States
- Location: 459 Crafts St., Newton, Massachusetts
- Coordinates: 42°21′31″N 71°12′42″W
- Area: 0.4 acres (0.16 ha)
- Built: 1897
- Architectural style: Queen Anne, Colonial Revival
- MPS: Newton MRA
- NRHP reference No.: 96000364
- Added to NRHP: April 04, 1996

The Charles Maynard House is a historic house at 459 Crafts Street in Newton, Massachusetts. The house was built in 1897, and is an example of a Queen Anne Victorian with Colonial Revival styling. It is also notable as the home of naturalist and taxidermist Charles Johnson Maynard. The house was listed on the National Register of Historic Places in 1996.

== Description and history ==
The Maynard House is located on the north side of Crafts Street, a historic thoroughfare connecting Waltham and Newton Corner. It is a 2 1/2-story wood-frame structure, with asymmetrical massing and a complex roofline typical of the Queen Anne period. The walls are finished in wooden clapboards, and the building rests on a fieldstone foundation. The hip roof is pierced by a number of gabled dormers, and there is an octagonal tower with pyramidal roof at one corner. The front porch has a flat roof, and is supported by Tuscan columns with a simple balustrade.

The house was built in 1897, and is fairly typical of the suburban residential construction taking place in Newton at that time. The house was built on part of what was once the Maynard family farm, subdivided from property owned by Charles Johnson Maynard's brother. Charles Johnson Maynard was a prominent naturalist and taxidermist who worked and lived in Boston for many years, but returned to Newton in 1897, and remained in this house until his death in 1929. Maynard was a prominent local lecturer, and published at least eleven books on bird-related topics.

== See also ==
- National Register of Historic Places listings in Newton, Massachusetts
