= Edward Augustus Samuels =

American naturalist

Edward Augustus Samuels (July 4, 1836 in Boston – May 27, 1908 in Fitchburg, Massachusetts) was a Massachusetts naturalist.

== Biography ==
He received a common school education, and began early to write for the press. From 1860 until 1880, he was assistant to the secretary of the Massachusetts Board of Agriculture. For several years, he was president of the Massachusetts Fish and Game Protective Association (1885–1892), besides following the business of a publisher of musical works (1870-c.1890). He developed a process for engraving by photography directly from nature or from a photographic print.

== Writing ==
Samuels contributed long essays to U.S. and Massachusetts agricultural reports. Among his publications are:

- Ornithology and oölogy of New England (Boston, 1867) The fifth edition of this work appeared as The Birds of New England in 1870, under which title it was best known. Technical information is quoted from Spencer F. Baird's works. The book sparked much interest in bird study.
- Among the Birds (1867)
- Mammalogy of New England (1868)
- The Living World, with Augustus C. L. Arnold (2 vols., 1868–70)
- With Fly-Rod and Camera (New York, 1890)
- Somerville, past and present (1897) He edited this work with Henry H. Kimball.

== Family ==
His wife, Susan Blagge Caldwell Samuels (b. October 21, 1848, Dedham, Massachusetts), wrote children's stories. She was a daughter of U.S. Navy Commodore Charles H. B. Caldwell. Before marriage, she taught in Waltham and Boston. In 1885, she was a member of the school committee of Waltham. Susan Samuels was the author of numerous stories that appeared in juvenile magazines and religious weeklies. She also wrote a series of books called "Springdale Stories" (6 vols., Boston, 1871), which were re-issued as "Golden Rule Stories" (1886). Edward Augustus Samuels' sister, Adelaide Florence Samuels (b. September 24, 1845, Boston) also wrote. She was educated in a district school at Milton, Massachusetts, and became a teacher and ultimately a writer for young people. Among her books were:

- Adrift in the World (Boston, 1872)
- Little Cricket (1873)
- Daisy Travers, or the Girls of Hive Hall (1876)
