= Ruthven Deane =

American ornithologist

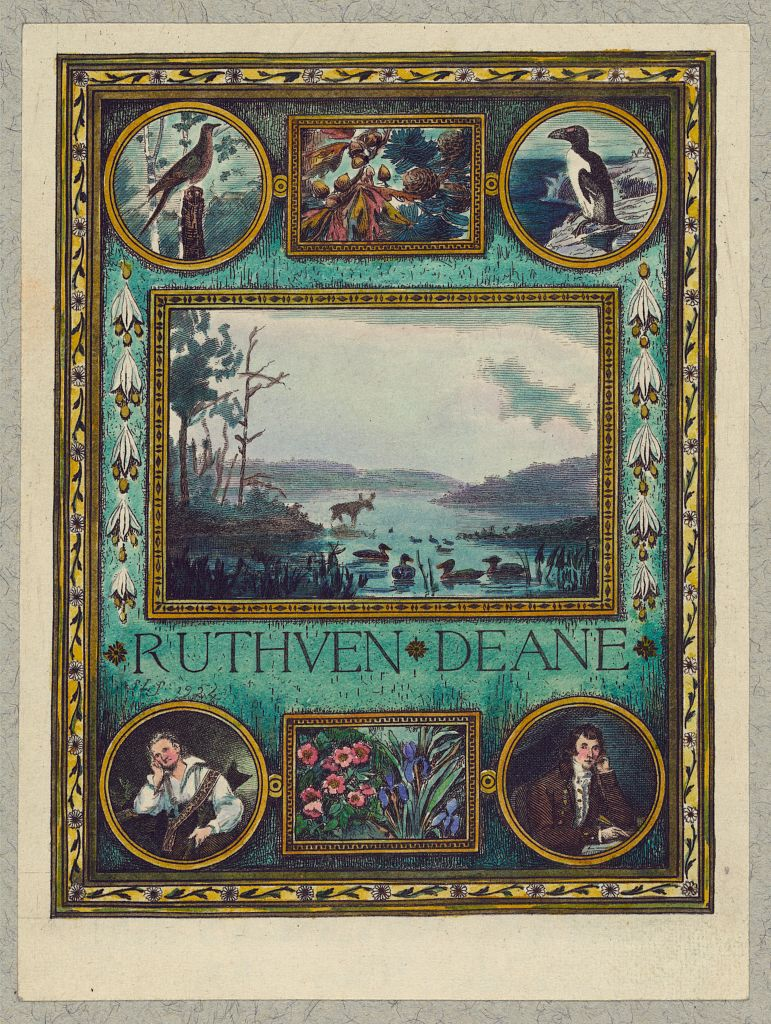
Bookplate of Ruthven Deane

Ruthven Deane (20 August 1851 – 20 March 1934) was an American ornithologist, noted as a founding member of the American Ornithologists' Union and for his collection of photographic portraits of ornithologists and naturalists.

== Early life ==
Deane was born in Cambridgeport. From an early age, he was an enthusiastic amateur ornithologist. As a schoolboy he was a close friend to William Brewster and Daniel French and went on field trips with those two and other boys. He was the younger brother of ornithologist and botanist Walter Deane. At about 18 years of age, he obtained employment in Boston at Dana Bros., a company that imported sugar and molasses from the West Indies. The Boston Fire of 1872 caused him to find employment in the insurance business, where he continued until 1880, when he moved to Chicago to join his brother Charles E. Deane in the wholesale grocery firm of Deane Bros. and Lincoln.

== AOU and later ==
In 1883 Ruthven Deane was one of the main organizers of the American Ornithologists' Union. In 1885 he married. In 1897 the Illinois Audubon Society was organized, the fourth of the state societies, with Ruthven Deane as its first president; he was successively re-elected for the next 16 years, serving as president from 1898–1914. In 1903 he retired from business at the age of fifty-two to devote himself to ornithology. He made available his collection of bird skins to the Chicago Academy of Sciences and donated his collection of 43 albino stuffed birds to the Field Museum of Natural History. His publications occur mainly in The Auk and the Bulletin of the Nuttall Ornithology Club, with 112 titles in those two journals. He was a collector of Audubonia, photographic portraits of ornithologists and naturalists, and bookplates. He died in Chicago, aged 82.
