= Henry Augustus Purdie =

American ornithologist and naturalist

Henry Augustus Purdie (December 16, 1840 – March 29, 1911) was an American ornithologist and naturalist. He was a founding member of the American Ornithologists' Union, and a president of the Nuttall Ornithological Club.

== Biography ==
Purdie was born near Smyrna, Turkey. He was the son of John Purdie, a British consul, and Eleanor Pratt, his Massachusetts-born wife. Although born in the Ottoman Empire, he moved to West Newton, Massachusetts as a child.

By 1858, Purdie was devoting himself to ornithology, collecting nests and eggs. However, in 1862 he joined the navy to fight in the American Civil War. He was discharged the next year for frequent seasickness.

After the war, Purdie made connections with leading ornithologists and became a founding member of the Nuttall Ornithological Club, serving as its vice president in 1873 to 1875, and then the president from 1875 to 1876. In 1883, he was an original member of the American Ornithologists' Union. Additionally, he was a member of the Boston Society of Natural History.

Unlike most of the leading ornithologists, Purdie did not publish any books. However, he did a lot of field work and published his findings in leading naturalist journals such as The American Naturalist, Nuttall Bulletin and The Auk. He also provided notes for books written by such figures as Edward Augustus Samuels and Elliott Coues . William Brewster wrote a detailed biography on Purdie in 1912 in The Auk.
