= Nuttall Ornithological Club =

Oldest U.S. ornithology organization

- Formation: 1873
- Type: Nonprofit organization
- Location: Cambridge, Massachusetts
- Affiliations: American Ornithologists' Union; Harvard University
- Website: nuttallclub.org

The Nuttall Ornithological Club is the oldest ornithology organization in the United States.

== History ==
The club initially was a small informal group of William Brewster's childhood friends, all of whom shared his interest in ornithology. These friends included Daniel Chester French, Ruthven Deane and Henry Henshaw. In 1872, Henshaw suggested that the group meet on a regular weekly schedule at Brewster's house in Cambridge, Massachusetts. On November 17, 1873, the group, which had expanded to include Henry Augustus Purdie, William Earl Dodge Scott, Francis P. Atkinson, Harry Balch Bailey, Ernest Ingersoll, and Walter Woodman, met to formally establish the first American ornithological club. They named their club after the botanist and zoologist Thomas Nuttall who published the first field guide for North American birds, Manual of the Ornithology of the United States and of Canada (1832).

By 1876 the club determined to publish the Bulletin of the Nuttall Ornithological Club, which was the first purely ornithological journal, under the joint editorship of Charles Johnson Maynard and Henry Augustus Purdie. However, after one issue, Maynard and Purdie were removed as editors and Joel Asaph Allen, who had recently joined the club, became the sole editor-in-chief.

== Notable members ==
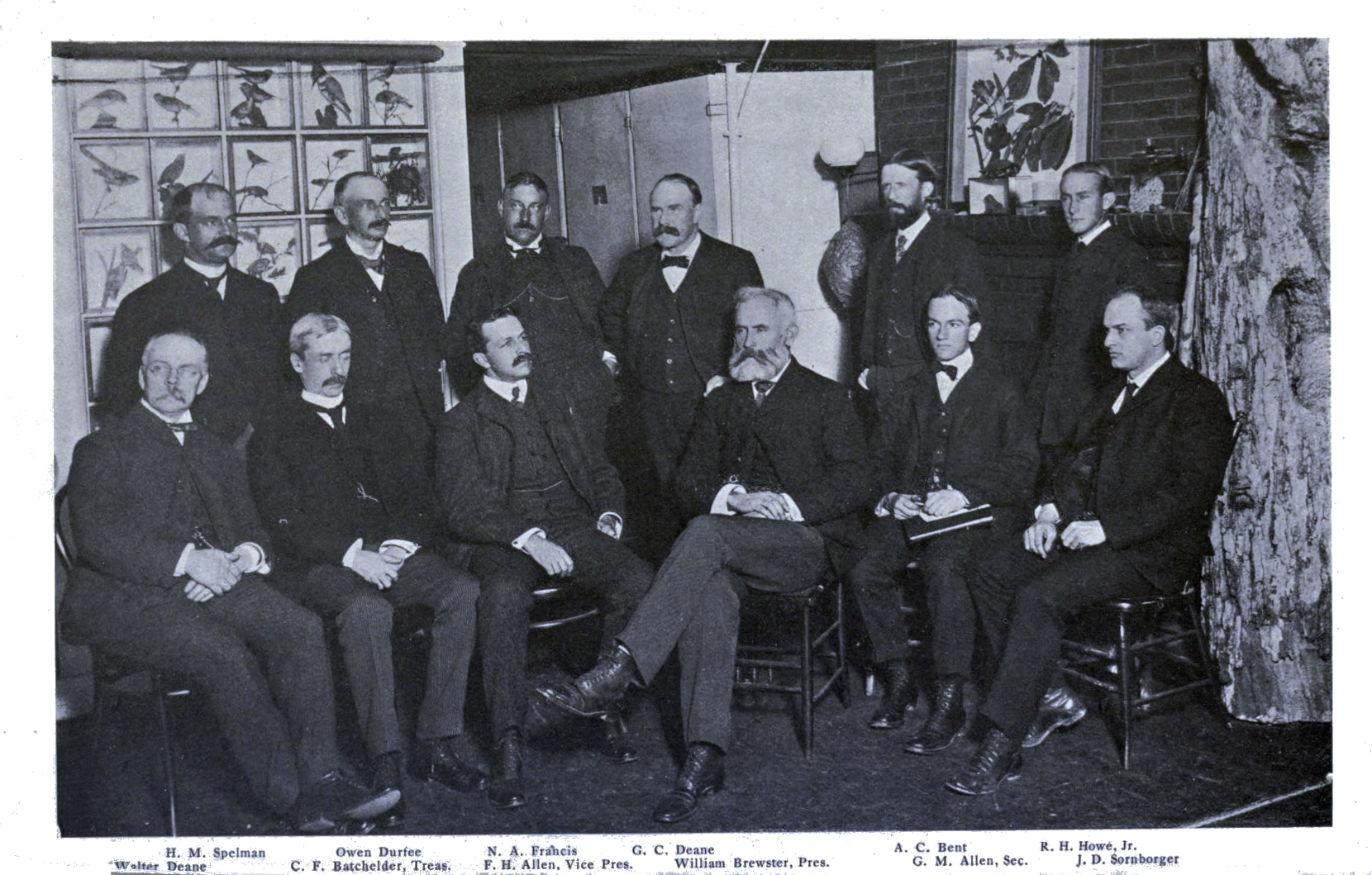
H. M. Spelman, Owen Durfee, N. A. Francis, G. C. Deane, A. C. Bent, R. H. Howe, Jr., Walter Deane, C. F. Batchelder, F. H. Allen, William Brewster, G. M. Allen, and J. D. Sornborger; 1902

Theodore Roosevelt, 26th President of the United States, was a member of the club, one of only a few presidents who published papers in peer reviewed scientific journals. Roger Tory Peterson, author of the Peterson field guides.

== Publications ==
- 1876–1883 – Bulletin of the Nuttall Ornithological Club (became The Auk in 1883)
- Quarterly bulletin of the Nuttall Ornithological Club
- Memoirs of the Nuttall Ornithological Club
