= William Brewster (ornithologist) =

American ornithologist and conservationist (1851–1919)

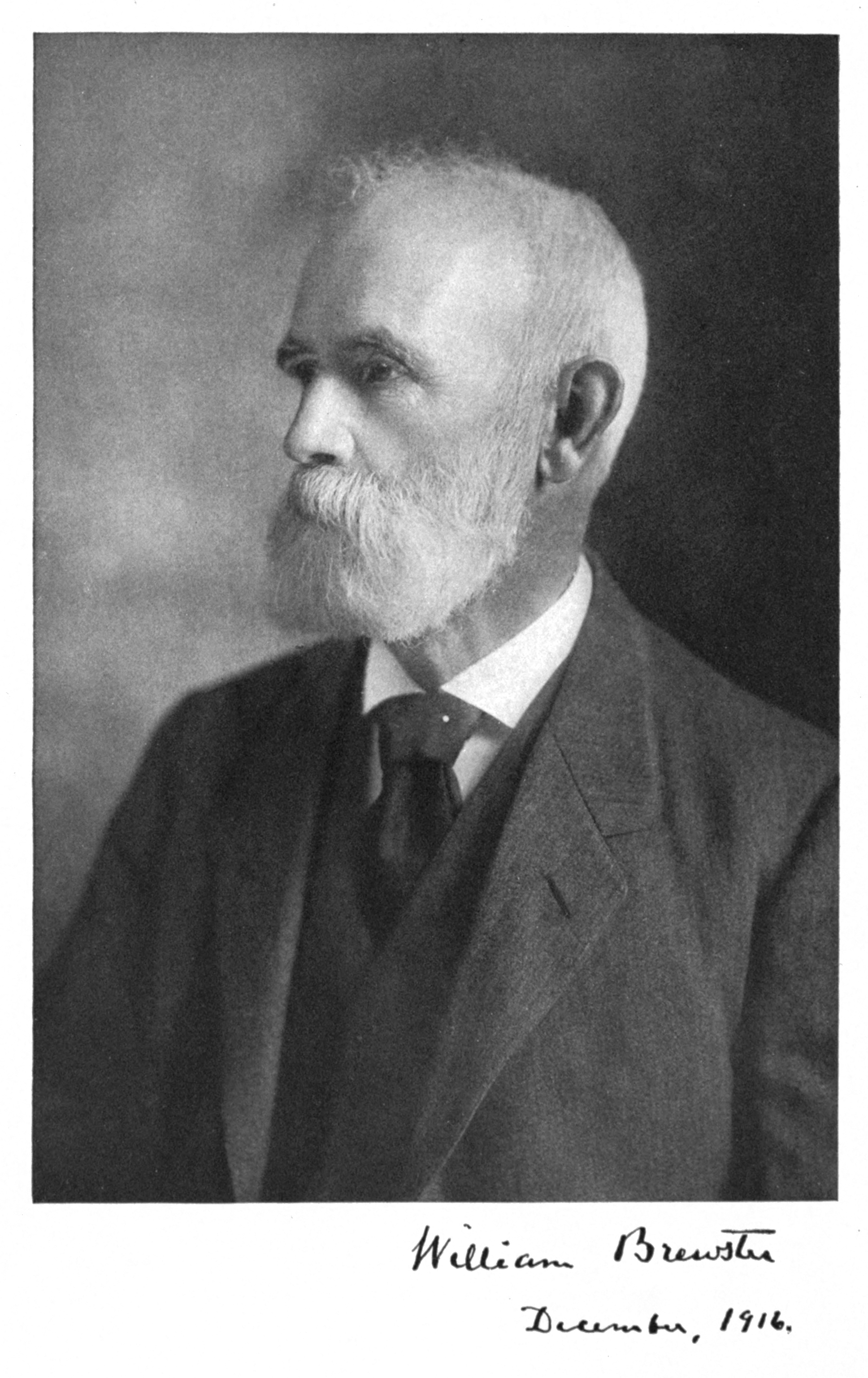
- Born: July 5, 1851; Wakefield, MA
- Died: July 11, 1919 (aged 68); Cambridge, Massachusetts
- Known for: Bird Migration, Birds of the Cape Regions of Lower California, Birds of the Cambridge Region of Massachusetts
- Parents: John Brewster, banker (father); Rebecca Parker (Noyes) (mother)
- Scientific career
- Fields: Ornithologist, naturalist
- Workplaces: Museum of Comparative Zoology, Harvard University
- Author abbrev. (zoology): Brewster

William Brewster (July 5, 1851 – July 11, 1919) was an American ornithologist, naturalist, and conservationist. He worked as a curator at the Museum of Comparative Zoology at Harvard University, co-founded the American Ornithologists' Union and the Nuttall Ornithological Club, and served as the first president of Mass Audubon.

== Early life and education ==
=== Childhood ===
William Brewster was born on July 5, 1851, in South Reading (now Wakefield), Massachusetts, the youngest of four children born to John Brewster, a successful Boston banker, and Rebecca Parker (Noyes). The couple settled in Cambridge, Massachusetts in 1845. Brewster's sister and older brothers died in early childhood, inspiring Longfellow, a close neighbor, to write the poem The Open Window.

Brewster attended Cambridge public schools, Washington Grammar School and Cambridge High School, taking a preparatory course to enter Harvard. He suffered eyesight problems as a youth and into adulthood. He was often unable to read or study, sometimes for extended periods. During his last year of high school, he was unable to read so his mother read his lessons to him. His parents and doctors deemed him too frail and nearsighted to attend Harvard.

=== Early bird study ===
At about the age of 10, Brewster became close friends with a boy his age, Daniel Chester French. French's father was a hunter and amateur taxidermist who displayed his skill in cases in his home. Brewster's father gave him a gun and taught him to shoot, providing a means of collecting birds to study. In the nineteenth century, shooting was the usual way of collecting specimens. Binoculars were not generally available until the early twentieth century. In his book, Birds of the Cambridge Region, Brewster himself wrote, "On January 1, 1862, my friend Mr. Daniel C. French called at our house to give me my first lesson in taxidermy, an art known in those days to but very few persons save the professional bird stuffers." By 1865, Brewster had several cases of mounted birds and a collection of nests and eggs. A few years later, he learned to make skins and gave up mounting stuffed birds.

Brewster kept detailed records of his observations and continued to do so for the rest of his life. To encourage his interests, his father presented him with the five volumes of Audubon's Ornithological Biography.

== Career and accomplishments ==
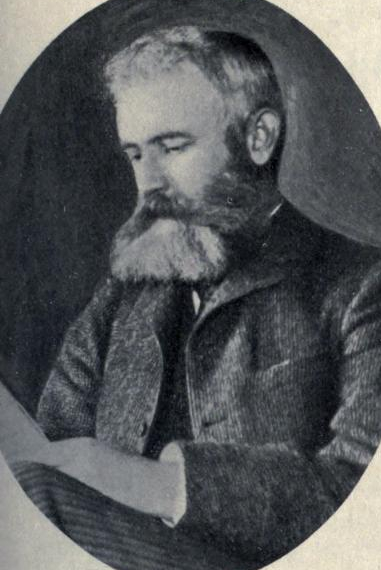

In 1880, he became assistant in charge of the collection of birds and mammals in the Boston Society of Natural History, and in 1885 became curator of mammals and birds at the Museum of Comparative Zoology at Harvard University, working closely with director Alexander Agassiz and Elizabeth Hodges Clark, where he served until his death, though after 1900 he cared for birds alone, and he left his position at the Boston Society of Natural History in 1887. He also devoted substantial time to his own private museum of ornithology and studied birds at his 300-acre rural property, which he called October Farm, in Concord, Massachusetts.

He spent much time on expeditions and from 1873 to 1898 he did so while suffering from bouts of lameness and debilitating pain in his legs. In 1898, lameness confined him to his hotel room in the Netherlands for two weeks. He was successfully treated by John Gehring, MD in Bethel Maine, who analyzed his problem as psychogenic and treated him with hypnotic suggestion. This allowed Brewster to hike 2–6 miles per day in his ornithological work. As he wrote to Gehring, "My legs, for the first time in twenty years, feel exactly alike. I did run and jump and try in every way to see if I could not reveal some lingering weakness but without doing so"

Brewster was a fellow of the American Association for the Advancement of Science, and in 1876 became president of the Nuttall Ornithological Club of Cambridge, of which he was the founder in 1873. He was a co-founder, with Elliott Coues and Joel Asaph Allen, of the American Ornithologists' Union (AOU) in 1883 and served as its president from 1895 to 1898.

Brewster served as the first president of Mass Audubon (Massachusetts Audubon Society) from 1896 to 1913, founded by Harriet Lawrence Hemenway and Minna B. Hall, with a mandate to advance legislation to restrict the killing of birds and sale of their plumage. The group, with over half its officers being women, used its political power to have a Massachusetts law passed in 1897 outlawing trade in wild bird feathers and the 1900 Lacey Act, which prohibits interstate shipment of animals killed in violation of local laws.

== Published works ==
Brewster published over 300 articles in the Bulletin of the Nuttall Ornithological Club, in the Annals of the New York Lyceum of Natural History, Proceedings of the Boston Society of Natural History, The Auk, and other periodicals. He wrote:

- Bird Migration (1886)
- Birds of the Cape Regions of Lower California (1902)
- Birds of the Cambridge Region of Massachusetts (1906)

== Unpublished works ==
The Ernst Mayr Library of the Museum of Comparative Zoology at Harvard University maintains an archive of Brewster's journals, diaries, field notebooks, correspondence, and photographs. Much of this material has been digitized and is available through the Biodiversity Heritage Library.

== William Brewster Memorial Award ==
In honor of Brewster, the American Ornithological Society awards the William Brewster Memorial Award to the author or co-authors (not previously so honored) "of the most meritorious body of work (book, monograph, or series of related papers) on birds of the Western Hemisphere published during the past ten years." The award, consisting of a medal and honorarium, was given every other year from 1921 through 1937 and then annually.
