= List of ornithologists =

This is a list of ornithologists who have articles, in alphabetical order by surname. See also Category:Ornithologists.

== A ==
- John Abbot – US
- Clinton Gilbert Abbott – US
- William Louis Abbott – US
- Humayun Abdulali — India
- Joseph H. Acklen – US
- Jon E. Ahlquist – US
- Prince Akishino (皇嗣秋筱宮文仁親王) – Japan
- Luigi d'Albertis – Italy
- John Warren Aldrich – US
- Boyd Alexander – England
- Christopher James Alexander – England
- Horace Alexander – England/US
- Wilfred Backhouse Alexander – England
- Salim Ali – India
- Arthur Augustus Allen – US
- Elsa Guerdrum Allen – US
- Glover Morrill Allen – US
- Joel Asaph Allen – US
- Robert Porter Allen – US
- György Almásy – Hungary/Austria
- Per Alström – Sweden
- Bernard Altum – Germany
- Dean Amadon – US
- George W. Archibald – Canada/US
- John Ash – England
- Edwin Ashby – Australia
- Henry Philemon Attwater – England/Canada/US
- Yves Aubry – Canada
- Jean Victoire Audouin – France
- John James Audubon – France/US
- Oliver L. Austin – US
- Félix de Azara – Spain

== B ==
- Walther Bacmeister – Germany
- Alfred Marshall Bailey – US
- Florence Augusta Merriam Bailey – US
- Jean-Baptiste Bailly – France
- Spencer Fullerton Baird – US
- E. C. Stuart Baker – England
- Russell Balda – US
- August Carl Eduard Baldamus – Germany
- Jean-Christophe Balouet – France
- Vladimir Balthasar – Czech Republic
- Betsy Bang – US
- Outram Bangs – US
- V. B. Banjkovski – Russia
- Richard C. Banks – US
- David Armitage Bannerman – UK
- Walter Banzhaf – Germany
- Phyllis Barclay-Smith – UK
- Pierre Barrère – France
- Richard Mancliffe Barrington – Ireland
- Walter B. Barrows – US
- George A. Bartholomew – US
- Edward Bartlett – UK
- William Bartram – US
- Charles Foster Batchelder – US
- George Latimer Bates – US
- E. V. Baxter – Scotland
- Robert Cecil Beavan – England
- Johann Matthäus Bechstein – Germany
- Rollo Beck – US
- Jean-Baptiste Bécœur – France
- William Beebe – US
- Bruce Beehler – US
- William H. Behle – US
- Lyman Belding – US
- Brian Bell – New Zealand
- John Graham Bell – US
- Lev Osipovich Belopolsky – USSR
- Charles Bendire – US
- Constantine Walter Benson – England
- Arthur Cleveland Bent – US
- Andrew John Berger – US
- E. Alexander Bergstrom – US
- Hans von Berlepsch – Germany
- Grace Berlin – US
- Jacques Berlioz - France
- Victor Besaucèle – France
- Thomas Bewick – England
- Valentin Bianchi – Russia
- Eugene P. Bicknell – US
- Tim Birkhead – UK
- Biswamoy Biswas – India
- Gladys Black – US
- Emmet Reid Blake – US
- William Thomas Blanford – England
- August Wilhelm Heinrich Blasius – Germany
- Johann Heinrich Blasius – Germany
- Rudolf Blasius – Germany
- Edward Blyth – England
- George Augustus Boardman – US/Canada
- José Vicente Barbosa du Bocage – Portugal
- Walter Joseph Bock (1933–2022) – US
- Pieter Boddaert – Netherlands
- Hans von Boetticher – Germany
- Nikolay Boev – Bulgaria
- Zlatozar Boev – Bulgaria
- Friedrich Boie – Germany
- Auguste Boissonneau – France
- Charles Lucien Bonaparte – France
- James Bond – US
- Franco Andrea Bonelli – Italy
- J. Lewis Bonhote – England (1875–1922)
- Bernard Borggreve – Germany
- José Ignacio Borrero – Cuba
- Donald J. Borror – US
- Adolphe Boucard – France
- Rudyerd Boulton – US
- Jules Bourcier – France
- Frank Swift Bourns – US
- Louis Hippolyte Bouteille – France
- Johann Friedrich von Brandt – Germany/Russia
- Rex Brasher – US
- Mark Brazil – England/Japan
- Alfred Brehm – Germany
- Christian Ludwig Brehm – Germany
- Thomas Mayo Brewer – US
- William Brewster – US
- Mathurin Jacques Brisson – France
- Pierce Brodkorb – US
- Alan Brooke, 1st Viscount Alanbrooke – England
- Allan Brooks – Canada
- William Edwin Brooks – Ireland/India
- Herbert Brown – US
- Nathan Clifford Brown – US
- Thomas Browne – England
- Carl Friedrich Bruch – Germany
- Friedrich Brüggemann – Germany
- Morten Thrane Brünnich – Denmark
- William Alanson Bryan – US
- Henry Bryant – US
- Theodor Bühler-Lindenmeyer (1859–1899) – Switzerland
- Walter Buller – New Zealand
- William John Burchell – England
- Hermann Burmeister – Germany
- Edward H. Burtt Jr. – US
- Arthur Lennox Butler – India/England
- Edward Arthur Butler – England
- Johann Büttikofer – Switzerland/Netherlands/Liberia
- Sergei Buturlin – Russia

== C ==
- Jean Cabanis – Germany
- Samuel Cabot III – US
- Hélio Ferraz de Almeida Camargo – Brazil
- Archibald George Campbell – Australia
- Archibald James Campbell – Australia
- Melbourne Armstrong Carriker – US
- John Cassin – US
- Montague Chamberlain – Canada/US
- James Chapin – US
- Frank Chapman – US
- Frederick Nutter Chasen – England/Singapore
- Robert Ernest Cheesman – England
- Tso-hsin Cheng (郑作新) – China
- George Kruck Cherrie – US/Costa Rica
- John Lewis Childs – US
- Glen Chilton – Canada/Australia
- Leslie Christidis – Australia
- Tadeusz Chrostowski – Poland
- Charles Chubb – England
- Phillip Clancey – South Africa
- Austin Hobart Clark – US
- Nigel Cleere – England
- James Clements – US
- Stanley Cobb – US
- Herbert L. Coggins – US
- Leon Jacob Cole – US
- Peter Colston – UK
- Herbert Thomas Condon – Australia
- Boardman Conover – US
- William G. Conway – US
- Wells Cooke – US
- Emilio Cornalia – Italy
- Charles B. Cory – US
- Elliott Coues – US
- John Courtney – Australia
- Lee Crandall – US
- Philipp Jakob Cretzschmar – Germany
- Maunsell Crosby – US
- Georges Cuvier – France
- Ede Czynk – Hungary

== D ==
- Roberto Dabbene – Italy/Argentina
- Raymond de Dalmas – France
- François Marie Daudin – France
- Priya Davidar – India
- William Leon Dawson – US
- William Ryan Dawson – US
- Charles Walter De Vis – England/Australia
- C. Douglas Deane – UK
- Ruthven Deane – US
- Côme-Damien Degland – France
- Dudley DeGroot – US
- Herbert Girton Deignan – US
- Jean Théodore Delacour – France/US
- Jacques Delamain – France
- Adolphe Delattre – France
- Georgi Petrovich Dementiev – USSR
- Louis Denise – France
- Antoon Emeric Marcel De Roo – Belgium
- Jean-Marie Derscheid – Belgium
- René Louiche Desfontaines – France
- Marc Athanase Parfait Œillet des Murs – France
- Barbara DeWolfe – US
- Douglas Dewar – England
- Raol Shri Dharmakumarsinhji – India
- Elio Augusto Di Carlo – Italy
- Jared Diamond – US
- Elizabeth Dickens – US
- Edward C. Dickinson – English
- Donald Ryder Dickey – US
- Charles-Eusèbe Dionne – Canada
- John Disney – UK, Australia
- Viktor Rafaelyevich Dolnik – USSR/Russia
- Janusz Domaniewski – Poland
- Caroline Dormon – US
- Jean Dorst – France
- Henry Eeles Dresser – England
- Rudolf Drost – Germany
- Alphonse Joseph Charles Dubois – Belgium
- Bernard du Bus de Gisignies – Netherlands/Belgium
- Armando Dugand – Colombia
- Charles Dumont de Sainte-Croix – France
- Andrzej Dunajewski – Poland
- William Dutcher – US
- Jonathan Dwight – US
- Włodzimierz Dzieduszycki – Poland

== E ==
- George Edwards – England, "Father of British ornithology"
- Elon Howard Eaton – US
- Scott V. Edwards – US
- Christian Gottfried Ehrenberg – Germany
- Eugene Eisenmann – US
- Walter Elmer Ekblaw – US
- Carl R. Eklund – US
- Daniel Giraud Elliot – US
- Sir Hugh Elliott, 3rd Baronet – England
- Christian Érard – France
- Carlo von Erlanger – Germany
- Carl Euler – Switzerland
- Arthur Humble Evans – England
- Eduard Friedrich Eversmann – Germany
- Thomas Campbell Eyton – England

== F ==
- Frederik Faber – Denmark
- Robert Falla – New Zealand
- Donald S. Farner – US
- Norman Joseph Favaloro – Australia
- Walter Faxon – US
- Alan Feduccia – US
- Christoph Feldegg – Austria
- Frank Finn – England
- Otto Finsch – Germany
- Gustav Fischer – Germany
- Albert Kenrick Fisher – US
- James Maxwell McConnell Fisher – England
- Kenneth Fisher – England
- R. S. R. Fitter – England
- John W. Fitzpatrick – US
- Jon Fjeldså – Norway
- Jim Flegg – England
- Charles Fleming – New Zealand
- James Henry Fleming – Canada
- Edward Howe Forbush – US
- Joseph Forshaw – Australia
- Johann Reinhold Forster – Poland-Lithuania/England
- James Franklin – England/India
- Louis Fraser – England
- Percy Evans Freke – Ireland
- Herbert Friedmann – US
- Johan Dalgas Frisch – Brazil
- János Frivaldszky – Hungary
- Louis Agassiz Fuertes – US
- Max Fürbringer – Germany

== G ==
- Gaszton Gaál – Hungary
- Hans Friedrich Gadow – Germany
- Joseph Paul Gaimard – France
- Tim Gallagher – US
- William Gambel – US
- Wulf Gatter – Germany
- Heinrich Gaetke – Germany
- Prosper Garnot – France
- Isidore Geoffroy Saint-Hilaire – France
- Zéphirin Gerbe – France
- Hans Freiherr Geyr von Schweppenburg – Germany
- Enrico Hillyer Giglioli – Italy
- Frank Gill – US
- Theodore Gill – US
- Ernest Thomas Gilliard – US
- Robert Gillmor – England
- Giuseppe Ginanni – Italy
- Nikolai Alekseievich Gladkov – USSR
- Constantin Wilhelm Lambert Gloger – Germany
- Johann Friedrich Gmelin – Germany
- Frederick DuCane Godman – England
- Henry Haversham Godwin-Austen – England
- Mauricio González-Gordon y Díez – Spain
- Derek Goodwin – England
- Philip Henry Gosse – England
- John Gould – England
- Claude H. B. Grant – England
- Rolf Grantsau – Germany/Brazil
- George Robert Gray – England
- John Edward Gray (brother of George Robert) – England
- Andrew Jackson Grayson – US
- James Greenway – US
- Edward Grey, 1st Viscount Grey of Fallodon – England
- Joseph Grinnell – US
- Ludlow Griscom – US
- Hermann Grote – Germany
- Philippe Guéneau de Montbeillard – France
- Johan Ernst Gunnerus – Norway
- Jan Willem Boudewijn Gunning – Netherlands/South Africa
- John Henry Gurney Jr. – UK
- John Henry Gurney Sr. – UK
- Eberhard Gwinner – Germany
- Nils Carl Gustaf Fersen Gyldenstolpe – Sweden

== H ==
- Masauji Hachisuka (蜂須賀正氏) – Japan
- Jack Hailman – United States
- Mihkel Härms – Estonia
- Yngvar Hagen – Norway
- Pat Hall – England
- Bernhard Hantzsch – Germany
- Edward Hargitt – Scotland
- Herbert Hastings Harington – British India
- Edward Harris – US
- Colin Harrison – England
- Tom Harrisson – Argentina/England
- Ernst Hartert – Germany
- Gustav Hartlaub – Germany
- François Haverschmidt – Netherlands
- Arthur Hay, 9th Marquess of Tweeddale (published as Viscount Walden) – Scotland
- Helen Hays – US
- Cornelis Hazevoet – Netherlands
- Gerhard Heilmann – Denmark
- Ferdinand Heine – Germany
- Bernd Heinrich – US
- Katharina Heinroth – Germany
- Oskar Heinroth – Germany
- Carl Eduard Hellmayr – Austria
- Wilhelm Hemprich – Germany
- George Morrison Reid Henry – British Ceylon/England
- Henry Wetherbee Henshaw – US
- James Hepburn – England/Canada
- Ottó Herman – Hungary
- Johann Hermann – France
- Theodor von Heuglin – Germany
- Joseph Hickey – US
- Keith Alfred Hindwood – Australia
- Warren Billingsley Hitchcock – Australia
- John Hobbs – UK/Australia
- Brian Houghton Hodgson – England/India
- Ralph Hoffmann – US
- Peter Hogg - England/Sudan
- Carl Peter Holbøll – Denmark
- Richard T. Holmes – US
- Jacques Bernard Hombron – France
- Ajoy Home – India
- Alexander von Homeyer – Germany
- Eugen Ferdinand von Homeyer – Germany
- Andries Hoogerwerf – Netherlands
- Milton N. Hopkins – US
- Thomas Horsfield – US
- Henry Eliot Howard – England
- Thomas Raymond Howell – US
- William Henry Hudson – Argentina/England
- Allan Octavian Hume – England/India
- Rob Hume – England
- Syed Abdulla Hussain – India
- Frederick Hutton – England/New Zealand

== I ==
- Hermann von Ihering – Germany/Brazil
- Johann Karl Wilhelm Illiger – Germany
- Collingwood Ingram – England
- Tom Iredale – UK/Australia
- Michael Patrick Stuart Irwin – Britain/Rhodesia
- Hussein Adan Isack – Kenya
- Yuri Andreyevich Isakov – Russia/USSR

== J ==
- Pierre Jabouille – France
- Frederick John Jackson – England/Uganda
- Honoré Jacquinot – France
- Helen F. James – US
- Sir William Jardine, 7th Baronet – Scotland
- Konstanty Jelski – Poland
- Thomas C. Jerdon – England/India
- Herbert K. Job – US
- Hans Johansen – Russia/Denmark
- Hermann Johansen – Russia
- Richard F. Johnston – US
- Lynds Jones – US
- Christian Jouanin – France
- Henri Jouard – France
- F. C. R. Jourdain – UK
- Pierre Louis Jouy – US
- George Junge – Netherlands

== K ==
- Peter Kaestner – US
- Gisela Kaplan – Australia
- Johann Jakob Kaup – Germany
- Janet Kear – England
- Charles Keeler – US
- John Gerrard Keulemans – Netherlands
- Charles Rollin Keyes – US
- Alexander Keyserling – Germany
- Lavkumar Khachar – India
- Norman Boyd Kinnear – Scotland
- Jared Kirtland – US
- Heinrich von Kittlitz – Germany
- Niels Kjærbølling – Denmark
- Otto Kleinschmidt – Germany
- C. Boden Kloss – England/Malaya
- Karel Kněžourek – Czechoslovakia
- Walter Koelz – US
- Alexander Koenig – Germany
- Maria Koepcke – Peru
- Paul Robert Kollibay – Prussia
- Elizabeth Kozlova – Russia
- Niels Krabbe – Denmark
- K. S. R. Krishna Raju – India
- Heinrich Kuhl – Germany
- Hans Kummerlöwe (or Kumerloeve after World War II) – Germany
- Nagahisa Kuroda (黒田長久) – Japan
- Nagamichi Kuroda (黒田長礼) – Japan
- Sayako Kuroda (黒田清子) – Japan
- Friedrich Kutter – Germany

== L ==
- David Lack – England
- Elizabeth Lack – England
- Frédéric de Lafresnaye – France
- Hamilton Mack Laing – Canada
- Christian Ludwig Landbeck – Germany
- Bill Lane – Australia
- Amelia Laskey – US
- John Latham – England
- Alfred Laubmann – Germany
- Louis Lavauden – France
- George Newbold Lawrence – US
- Edgar Leopold Layard – England/Ceylon
- Dudley Le Souef – Australia
- Elsie P. Leach – England
- William Elford Leach – England
- John Legg – England
- William Vincent Legge – Australia
- Johann Philipp Achilles Leisler – Germany
- Boonsong Lekagul – Thailand
- Juan Lembeye – Spain
- Jean-Baptiste Leschenault de La Tour – France
- René Lesson – France
- François Levaillant – France
- Paul Leverkühn – Germany
- Graceanna Lewis – US
- Félix Louis L'Herminier – France
- Hinrich Lichtenstein – Germany
- Karl Theodor Liebe – Germany
- Carl Linnaeus – Swedish
- Thomas Littleton Powys, 4th Baron Lilford – England
- Bradley C. Livezey – US
- Victor Loche – France
- George Loddiges – England
- Hans Löhrl – Germany
- Agathe François Gouÿe de Longuemare – France
- Einar Lönnberg – Sweden
- Konrad Lorenz – Austria
- Harald von Loudon – Germany
- Michel Louette – Belgium
- Herman L. Løvenskiold – Norway
- Percy Lowe – England
- George Lowery – US
- Oskar Engelhard von Löwis of Menar – Latvia/Germany/Russia
- Hubert Lynes – Wales/England

== M ==
- James Macdonald – Scotland/Australia
- William MacGillivray – Scotland
- Cyril Mackworth-Praed – England
- Gyula Madarász – Austria-Hungary
- Wolfgang Makatsch – Germany
- Alexey Sergeevich Malchevsky – Russia
- Alfred Malherbe – France
- Louis Mandelli – Italy, India
- Saverio Manetti – Italy
- Arner Ludvig Valdemar Manniche - Denmark
- Stephen Marchant – Australia
- Judy Kellogg Markowsky – US
- Charles Henry Tilson Marshall – England/India
- Jochen Martens – Germany
- Kathy Martin – Canada
- Ian J. Mason – Australia
- George Masters – Australia
- Gregory Mathews – Australia
- Ernst Mayr – US
- George A. McCall – US
- Elliott McClure – US/Southeast Asia
- John Porter McCown – US
- Allan Reginald McEvey – Australia
- Richard Crittenden McGregor – Australia/US
- Edward Avery McIlhenny – US
- Thomas McIlwraith – Canada
- Charles McKay – US
- Chris Mead – England
- Edmund Meade-Waldo – England
- Edgar Alexander Mearns – US
- Gerlof Mees – Netherlands
- M. F. M. Meiklejohn – England
- Annie Meinertzhagen – Scotland
- Richard Meinertzhagen – England
- Wilhelm Meise – Germany
- Auguste Ménégaux – France
- Mikhail Aleksandrovich Menzbier – Russia
- Christopher Merret – England
- C. Hart Merriam – US
- Olivier Messiaen – France
- Friedrich Wilhelm Meves - Germany/Sweden
- Adolf Bernhard Meyer – Germany
- Rodolphe Meyer de Schauensee – US
- Alden H. Miller – US
- Waldron DeWitt Miller – US
- Alexander William Milligan – Australia
- Alphonse Milne-Edwards – France
- Clive Minton – Australia
- Lacy Irvine Moffett – US
- Juan Ignacio Molina – Chile
- Edgardo Moltoni – Italy
- Burt Monroe – US
- George Montagu – England
- John J. Montgomery – US
- Frederic Moore – England
- Robert Thomas Moore – US
- Reginald Ernest Moreau – England
- Hans Christian Cornelius Mortensen – Denmark
- Guy Mountfort – England
- Philipp Ludwig Statius Müller – Germany
- Salomon Müller – Germany
- Étienne Mulsant – France
- Robert Cushman Murphy – US
- Durno Murray – Australia

== N ==
- Johann Natterer – Austria
- Johann Friedrich Naumann – Germany
- René de Naurois – France
- K. K. Neelakantan – India
- Adolph Nehrkorn – Germany
- Henry Nehrling – US
- Edward William Nelson – US
- Thomas Hudson Nelson – England
- Oscar Neumann – Germany
- Oliver Michael Griffiths Newman – Australia
- Alfred Newton – England
- Edward Newton – England
- Ian Newton – England
- Margaret Morse Nice – US
- Michael John Nicoll – UK/Egypt
- John Treadwell Nichols – US
- Max Nicholson – England
- Günther Niethammer – Germany
- Alexander von Nordmann – Finland
- Alfred John North – Australia
- Cornelius Nozeman – Netherlands

== O ==
- Eugene W. Oates – England/Burma
- Harry C. Oberholser – US
- Bill Oddie – England
- William Robert Ogilvie-Grant – Scotland
- Claes Christian Olrog – Sweden/Argentina
- Storrs L. Olson – US
- Eduard Daniël van Oort – Netherlands
- Alcide d'Orbigny – France
- George Ord – US
- Gordon Orians – US
- Wilfred Hudson Osgood – US
- Émile Oustalet – France

== P ==
- Peter Simon Pallas – Germany
- Shane A. Parker – England/Australia
- Theodore A. Parker III – US
- Kenneth Carroll Parkes – US
- Carl Parrot – Germany
- Charles Parzudaki – Turkiye/France
- Titian Peale – US
- Thomas Gilbert Pearson – US
- August von Pelzeln – Austria
- Thomas E. Penard – US
- Thomas Pennant – Wales
- James Lee Peters – US
- Wilhelm Peters – Germany
- Roger Tory Peterson – US
- Sewall Pettingill – US
- William Henry Phelps – US/Venezuela
- William H. Phelps Jr. – Venezuela
- Rodolfo Amando Philippi – Germany/Chile
- Allan Robert Phillips – US
- John Charles Phillips – US
- Theodor Pleske – Russia
- Olivério Pinto – Brazil
- Frank Pitelka – US
- Graham Pizzey – Australia
- Sally Poncet – Australia
- Pilai Poonswad – Thailand
- John du Pont – US
- Leonid Aleksandrovich Portenko – USSR(Ukraine)
- Harold Douglas Pratt Jr. – US
- Josef Prokop Pražák – Bohemia
- Alexandre Prigogine – Belgium
- Aleksandr Promptov – Russia/USSR
- Nikolay Przhevalsky (or Przewalski) – Russia
- Jacques Pucheran – France

== Q ==
- Jean René Constant Quoy – France
- Vo Quy – Vietnam

== R ==
- Dioscoro S. Rabor – Philippines
- Stamford Raffles – England/Singapore
- Ralph Raitt – US
- Edward Pierson Ramsay – Australia
- Austin L. Rand – Canada
- Pamela C. Rasmussen – US
- Sushma Reddy – India/US
- Ludwig Reichenbach – Germany
- Anton Reichenow – Germany
- Pauline Reilly – Australia
- Othmar Reiser – Austria
- Bernhard Rensch – Germany
- John Richardson – Scotland/England
- Charles Wallace Richmond – US
- Robert S. Ridgely – US
- John Livzey Ridgway – US
- Robert Ridgway – US
- Joseph Harvey Riley – US
- Leonora Jeffrey Rintoul – Scotland
- Sidney Dillon Ripley – US
- Robert Ritter von Dombrowski – Bohemia/Romania
- Chandler Robbins – US
- Austin Roberts – South Africa
- Thomas Sadler Roberts – US
- Herbert C. Robinson – England/Malaya
- Edward Hearle Rodd – England
- Theodore Roosevelt – US
- Hermann von Rosenberg – Germany
- Walter Rothschild, 2nd Baron Rothschild – England
- Frank Rozendaal – Netherlands
- Eduard Rüppell – Germany
- Karl Russ – Germany(Prussia)
- Erich Rutschke – Germany
- Wladyslaw Rydzewski – Poland

== S ==
- Edward Sabine – Ireland
- John Hall Sage – US
- Finn Salomonsen – Denmark
- Tommaso Salvadori – Italy
- Osbert Salvin – England
- Howard Saunders – England
- William Edwin Saunders – Canada
- William Savage – US
- Paolo Savi – Italy
- Hans Schaanning – Norway
- Alfred Schifferli – Switzerland
- Eiler Lehn Schiøler – Denmark
- Hermann Schlegel – Germany/Netherlands
- Richard Schodde – Australia
- Henri Schouteden – Belgium
- Ernst Schüz – Germany
- Philip Sclater – England
- William Lutley Sclater – England
- Giovanni Antonio Scopoli – Austria/Tyrol
- J. Michael Scott – US
- Peter Scott – England
- William Earl Dodge Scott - US
- Henry Seebohm – England
- Josef Seilern – Austria/Czech
- Prideaux John Selby – England
- George B. Sennett – US
- Pavel Vladimirovich Serebrovsky – Russia/USSR
- William Serle – Scotland
- Nikolai Alekseevich Severtzov (or Severtsov) – Russia
- Richard Bowdler Sharpe – England
- George Shaw – England
- Frederick H. Sheldon – US
- George Ernest Shelley – England
- Althea Sherman – US
- Hadoram Shirihai – Israel
- Lester L. Short – US
- Leonid Shulpin – Russia/USSR
- Charles Sibley – US
- David Allen Sibley – US
- Helmut Sick – Brazil
- Hendrik Cornelis Siebers – Netherlands
- Eugène Simon – French
- Ken Simpson – Australia
- Vasily Nikolaevich Skalon – Russia/USSR
- Cuthbert John Skead – South Africa
- Alexander Skutch – US
- Tore Slagsvold – Norway
- Henry H. Slater – England
- Andrew Smith – Scotland
- Edward Smith-Stanley, 13th Earl of Derby – England
- Bertram E. Smythies – England
- Emilie Snethlage – Germany/Brazil
- David Snow – England
- Barbara Snow – England
- Jan Sokolowski – Poland
- Soekarja Somadikarta – Indonesia
- James Mortimer Southwick – US
- Evgeni Pavlovich Spangenberg – USSR
- Anders Erikson Sparrman – Sweden
- Johann Baptist von Spix – Germany
- Isaac Sprague – US
- Don Stap – US
- David Steadman – US
- Joseph Beal Steere – US
- Boris K. Stegmann – Russia/USSR
- Joachim Steinbacher – Germany
- Leonhard Stejneger – Norway – US
- Georg Steller – Germany
- Leo Stepanyan – USSR/Armenia
- James Francis Stephens – England
- Ferdinand Stoliczka – Czech Republic
- Jean Stolzmann (also as Jan Sztolcman) – Poland
- Witmer Stone – US
- Robert W. Storer – US
- Erwin Stresemann – Germany
- Hugh Edwin Strickland – England
- Robert Stroud – US
- Noah Strycker – US
- Jacob H. Studer – US
- Johann Heinrich Christian Friedrich Sturm – Germany
- Johann Wilhelm Sturm – Germany
- J. Denis Summers-Smith – Scotland/England
- Carl Jakob Sundevall – Sweden
- Petr Sushkin – Russia
- Ernst Sutter – Switzerland
- George Miksch Sutton – US
- William Swainson – England/New Zealand
- Harry Swarth – US
- Charles Swinhoe – England/India
- Robert Swinhoe – England/Formosa
- William Henry Sykes – England/India
- Jan Bogusław Szczepski – Poland
- Jan Sztolcman (also as Jean Stolzmann) – Poland

== T ==
- Władysław Taczanowski – Poland
- Léonce de Tarragon – France
- Coenraad Jacob Temminck – Netherlands
- John Kenneth Terres – US
- John Eliot Thayer – US
- Gerhard Thielcke – Germany
- Johannes Thienemann – Germany
- Ludwig Thienemann – Germany
- William Lay Thompson – US
- Arthur Landsborough Thomson – Scotland
- Claud B. Ticehurst – England
- Samuel Tickell – India
- Luuk Tinbergen – Netherlands
- Niko Tinbergen – Netherlands
- Friedrich Tischler – Prussia/Germany
- Walter Edmond Clyde Todd – US
- John David Digues La Touche – England/Ireland
- Charles Haskins Townsend – US
- John Kirk Townsend – US
- Melvin Alvah Traylor Jr. – US
- Alberto O. Treganza – US
- Roland Trimen – England/South Africa
- Henry Baker Tristram – England
- Johann Jakob von Tschudi – Switzerland
- Viktor von Tschusi zu Schmidhoffen – Austria
- Bernard Tucker – England
- Marmaduke Tunstall – England
- William Turner – England
- Konstanty Tyzenhauz – Poland

== U ==
- Miklós Udvardy – Hungary/Canada
- Richard J. Ussher – Ireland
- Tatsuo Utagawa (宇田川竜男) – Japan

== V ==
- Achille Valenciennes – France
- Dirk Van den Abeele – Belgium
- Jacques Van Impe – Belgium
- James Van Remsen Jr. – US
- Adriaan Joseph van Rossem – US
- Victor Van Someren – Australia/Kenya
- Josselyn Van Tyne – US
- Richard Vaughan – UK
- Charles Vaurie – France/US
- Édouard Verreaux – France
- Jules Verreaux – France
- Louis Pierre Vieillot – France
- Nicholas Aylward Vigors – Ireland/England
- Jack Vincent – England
- Keith Vinicombe – England
- William Vogt – US
- Karel Voous – Netherlands
- Adolphe Vorderman – Netherlands

== W ==
- Johann Georg Wagler – Germany
- Will Wagstaff – Wales/England
- Veleslav Wahl – Czechoslovakia
- Johan August Wahlberg – Sweden
- Karl Wahnes – Germany
- Lawrence H. Walkinshaw – US
- Alfred Russel Wallace – England
- Robert George Wardlaw-Ramsay – England
- Eliel Jonathan Warén – Finland
- George Robert Waterhouse – England
- George Waterston – Scotland
- Richard Weatherly – Australia
- Hugo Weigold – Germany
- Alexander Wetmore – US
- Hugh Whistler – India
- Joseph Whitaker – Italy/England
- Gilbert White – England
- Henry Luke White – Australia
- Henry Whitely
- Andrew Whittaker – England
- Otto Widmann – US
- Maximilian of Wied-Neuwied – Germany
- John Wiens – US
- George Willett – US
- Lionel William Wiglesworth – England
- Iolo Williams – Wales
- John G. Williams – Wales
- Francis Willughby – UK
- Alexander Wilson – Scotland/US
- Kerry-Jayne Wilson – NZ
- Scott Barchard Wilson – England
- Marie Winn – US
- Harry Witherby – England
- Kazimierz Wodzicki – Poland/New Zealand
- John Woinarski – Australia
- Hans Edmund Wolters – Germany
- Won Hong-gu, 원홍구 – North Korea (father of Won Pyong-oh)
- Won Pyong-oh, 원병오 – South Korea
- Samuel Washington Woodhouse – US
- Dean Conant Worcester – US
- Philogène Wytsman – Belgium

== X ==
- John Xantus – Hungary

== Y ==
- Yoshimaro Yamashina (山階芳麿) – Japan
- William Yarrell – England
- John Yealland – England

== Z ==
- Nikolai Alekseyvich Zarudny – Ukraine/Russia
- José Castulo Zeledón – Costa Rica
- John Todd Zimmer – US

== See also ==
- List of ornithologists abbreviated names
- List of birdwatchers
