= Markovsky =

Markovsky (masculine; Cyrillic: Марковский), Markovskaya (feminine; Марковская), or Markovskoye (neuter; Марковское) may refer to the following rural localities in Russia:

- Markovsky, Perm Krai
- Markovsky, Republic of Bashkortostan
- Markovsky, Volgograd Oblast
- Markovskaya, Kaduysky District, Vologda Oblast
- Markovskaya, Syamzhensky District, Vologda Oblast
- Markovskaya, Verkhovazhsky District, Vologda Oblast
- Markovskoye, Mezhdurechensky District, Vologda Oblast
- Markovskoye, Sokolsky District, Vologda Oblast

== See also ==
- Surnames derived from the name Mark
