= Markowsky =

Markowsky is a surname. Notable people with the surname include:

- Judy Kellogg Markowsky (1945–2011), American environmentalist
- Pascal Markowsky (born 1954), French politician
- Vincent Markowsky, known as Tom Tyler (1903–1954), American actor

== See also ==
- Markovsky
