= STAP =

STAP, or stap, may refer to:

== Name ==
- List of people with the surname Stap

== Science and technology ==
- Space-time adaptive processing, a signal processing technique
- Simple task-actor protocol, UI serialization spec for enabling symmetric sw access for AI and human users
- STAP1, a signal-transducing adaptor protein encoded by the STAP1 gene
- STAP2, a signal-transducing adaptor protein encoded by the STAP2 gene
- Stimulus-triggered acquisition of pluripotency, a proposed method of generating pluripotent stem cells
- SystemTap (stap), a Linux debugging utility

== Other uses ==
- Scientific and Technical Advisory Panel, an arm of the Global Environment Facility and part of the UN Family of organizations
- Single Trooper Aerial Platform, a fictional Star Wars vehicle
- São Tomé and Príncipe, country's acronym name is STAP

== See also ==
- Standard conditions for temperature and pressure (STP), a set of environmental parameters
