= William Lewin (disambiguation) =

William Lewin was an English naturalist.

William Lewin may also refer to:

- William Terriss, née William Lewin, British actor
- William Lewin (died 1598), tutor, ecclesiastical lawyer, judge, and member of parliament for Rochester
