= Walkinshaw =

Walkinshaw is a surname of Scottish origin. The surname is a habitational name derived from Walkinshaw in Renfrewshire. The name probably originates from the Old English wealcere "fuller" + sceaga "copse".

== People ==
- Alex Walkinshaw (born 1974), English, an actor
- Clementina Walkinshaw (1720–1802), mistress of Charles Edward Stuart (Bonnie Prince Charlie)
- James Walkinshaw (born 1982), American politician
- Lawrence H. Walkinshaw, (1904–1993), American ornithologist
- Tom Walkinshaw (1946–2010), Scottish race car driver

== Fictional characters ==
- Theodore Walkinshaw, a character in the stage play Foggerty's Fairy (1881) by W. S. Gilbert
- Walkinshaw, an alias briefly assigned to Pongo Twistleton in the short story "Uncle Fred Flits By" (1935) by P. G. Wodehouse

== See also ==
- Clan Walkinshaw, a Scottish clan
- Tom Walkinshaw Racing, a racing car team
- Walkinshaw Performance
