= Van den Abeele =

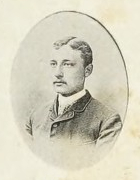
Maurice Van den Abeele

van den Abeele is a surname of Belgian origin, and may refer to:

- Albert van den Abeele (1907-????), Belgian sailor
- Andries Van den Abeele (born 1935), Belgian entrepreneur, politician, historian and historical preservationist
- Dirk Van den Abeele (born 1961), Belgian ornithologist
- Frank Van Den Abeele (born 1966), Belgian cyclist
- Michel van den Abeele, Belgian diplomat
- Paul Van Den Abeele (born 1965), Belgian windsurfer
- Pieter Van den Abeele, computer programmer
