= Banzhaf =

Banzhaf is a German occupational surname for a maker of vats and drinking vessels.

Notable people with this name include:

- Sofia Banzhaf, Canadian actress and filmmaker
- John Banzhaf, American lawyer
- Walter Banzhaf (1901–1941), German zoologist
