= Tatsuo Utagawa =

Japanese ornithologist

Tatsuo Utagawa (宇田川 竜男, Utagawa Tatsuo; 1917 – 2006) is a Japanese ornithologist and retired professor from Azabu University. A native of Tokyo, he graduated from Tokyo University in 1937 in veterinary medicine. He worked at Ueno Zoo. In 1958 he obtained his doctorate in science from Hokkaido University, on research in "A Comparative Study of chromosomes in birds". Later he became the Section Chief for Birds and Wild Animals at the Experimental Forestry Station for the Japanese Ministry of Agriculture and Forestry. In 1959 he was awarded the Ornithological Society of Japan Award and published various academic papers in the OSJ journal and other academic journals.

== Various works ==
- The God of Practical Jokes (1956)
- Handbook on the colours of wild birds (1957)
- Enjoyable methods for raising birds (1958)
- The crows story (1975; part of the Elementary Schools Natural Science Series of books)

== See also ==
- List of ornithologists
