= List of ornithologists abbreviated names =

This list of ornithologists abbreviated names is based on information from the older books on birds. In particular, the books by George Robert Gray and Richard Bowdler Sharpe. When reading these older books, abbreviated names are used that sometimes make little or no sense.

- In George Robert Gray's 1840 publication of List of the Genera of Birds, he uses abbreviated forms of the abbreviations, on occasion. Typically, this is done when he is repeating names within a species and genus set. Typically, but not always, the second (or the species abbreviation) has been further abbreviated. For example, in Family II, Subfamily I, Genus Daptrius is credited to Vieill for Louis Pierre Vieillot, and then further down in the next indented line it describes the species of that genus, and D. ater is credited to V which again is Vieillot.

== A to D ==
- Afzel → Adam Afzelius, a Swedish botanist.
- Antiq →
- Auct →
- Audeb → Jean-Baptiste Audebert, a French naturalist.
- Audu → John James Audubon, a French-American ornithologist.
- Azara → Félix de Azara, a Spanish naturalist.
- B → Charles Lucien Bonaparte, a French ornithologist and biologist.
- Barr → Gilbert Barrantes
- Bechst → Johann Matthäus Bechstein, a German ornithologist, naturalist, entomologist, and forester.
- Benn → George Bennett (naturalist), an Australian naturalist.
- Bl →
- Blum → Johann Friedrich Blumenbach, a German naturalist.
- Bodd → Pieter Boddaert, a Dutch naturalist.
- Boie → Heinrich Boie, a German Zoologist.
- Bonap → Charles Lucien Bonaparte, a French ornithologist and biologist.
- Bowd → Thomas Edward Bowdich, an English explorer.
- Br → Christian Ludwig Brehm or Mathurin Jacques Brisson.
- Brehm. → Christian Ludwig Brehm, a German ornithologist.
- Briss. → Mathurin Jacques Brisson, a French Zoologist.
- Buff → Georges-Louis Leclerc, Comte de Buffon, a French naturalist.
- Burch → William John Burchell, an English naturalist.
- Burt →
- Cab → Jean Cabanis, German ornithologist.
- Comm →
- Cuv → Georges Cuvier, a French naturalist and zoologist.
- Daud → François Marie Daudin, a French Zoologist.
- Desm →
- D'Orb → Alcide d'Orbigny, a French naturalist.
- Dum → Charles Dumont de Sainte-Croix, a French zoologist.

== E to H ==
- Edw → George Edwards, an English ornithologist and naturalist.
- Fisch Johann Fischer von Waldheim, a German entomologist.
- Flem → John Fleming, Scottish Zoologist and geologist.
- Forst → Johann Reinhold Forster, a German ornithologist.
- Frank → James Franklin, a British ornithologist.
- G. R. Gray → George Robert Gray, an English zoologist and ornithologist.
- Gaim → Joseph Paul Gaimard, a French naturalist.
- Garn →
- Geoffr → Étienne Geoffroy Saint-Hilaire, a French naturalist.
- Gloger → Constantin Wilhelm Lambert Gloger, a German ornithologist and zoologist.
- Gm → Johann Friedrich Gmelin, a German naturalist, botanist, entomologist and herpetologist.
- Goldf → Georg August Goldfuss, a German Zoologist and botanist.
- Gould → John Gould, an English ornithologist.
- Gray → George Robert Gray
- Griff →
- H → Brian Houghton Hodgson or Thomas Horsfield
- Hahn → Carl Wilhelm Hahn, a German zoologist.
- Herm →
- Hodgs → Brian Houghton Hodgson, a British naturalist.
- Hoffm → Johann Centurius Hoffmannsegg
- Horsf → Thomas Horsfield, an American naturalist.
- Humb → Alexander von Humboldt, a Prussian naturalist.

== I to L ==
- Ill → Johann Karl Wilhelm Illiger, a German zoologist and entomologist.
- J → Sir William Jardine, 7th Baronet
- J.E. Gray → John Edward Gray, a British zoologist.
- J. Geoffr → Isidore Geoffroy Saint-Hilaire, a French zoologist.
- Jacq → Honoré Jacquinot, a French zoologist.
- Jam → Robert Jameson, a Scottish naturalist and geologist.
- James Wilson → James Wilson, a Scottish zoologist.
- Jard → Sir William Jardine, 7th Baronet, a Scottish naturalist.
- King →
- Kittl → Heinrich von Kittlitz, a German naturalist.
- Kl →
- Knoch → August Wilhelm Knoch, a German naturalist.
- Kuhl → Heinrich Kuhl, a German ornithologist.
- L → Carl Linnaeus, a Swedish zoologist and botanist.
- Lacep → Bernard Germain de Lacépède, a French naturalist.
- Lafr → Frédéric de Lafresnaye, a French ornithologist.
- Lath → John Latham, an English ornithologist and naturalist.
- Leach → William Elford Leach, an English zoologist and marine biologist.
- Leadb → Benjamin Leadbeater, a British naturalist.
- Less → René Primevère Lesson, a French ornithologist, herpetologist, and naturalist.
- Levaill → François Levaillant, a French ornithologist and naturalist.
- Lew → William Lewin, an English naturalist.
- Lewin → William Lewin
- Licht → Martin Lichtenstein, a German herpetologist and zoologist.

== M to P ==
- Marm →
- Menetr → Édouard Ménétries, a French zoologist.
- Merr → Blasius Merrem, a German naturalist.
- Mey → Bernhard Meyer or Franz Meyen
- Meyen → Franz Meyen, a German botanist.
- Meyer → Bernhard Meyer, a German naturalist.
- Mill →
- Mœhr →
- Mull → Salomon Müller, a German naturalist.
- Naum → Johann Friedrich Naumann, a German ornithologist.
- Nitzsch → Christian Ludwig Nitzsch, a German zoologist.
- Nordm → Alexander von Nordmann, a Finnish zoologist.
- Ogil → William Ogilby, an Irish naturalist.
- Olim →
- Oppel →
- Pall → Peter Simon Pallas, a German zoologist and botanist.
- Pr. Max → Prince Maximilian of Wied-Neuwied, a German ornithologist.

== Q to T ==
- Q → Jean René Constant Quoy, a French zoologist.
- Qu → Jean René Constant Quoy
- Quoy → Jean René Constant Quoy
- Raffl → Stamford Raffles, a British statesman and zoologist.
- Ray → John Ray (1627-1705), English naturalist
- Reinw → Caspar Georg Carl Reinwardt, a Dutch botanist.
- Renn →
- Sav →
- Scop → Giovanni Antonio Scopoli, a Tyrolean naturalist.
- Selby → Prideaux John Selby, an English ornithologist and botanist.
- Shaw → George Shaw, an English zoologist and botanist.
- Sibb →
- Smith → Andrew Smith (zoologist), a Scottish zoologist.
- Sonn →
- Sparr → Anders Erikson Sparrman, a Swedish naturalist.
- Spix → Johann Baptist von Spix, a German naturalist.
- Steph → James Francis Stephens, an Englist entomologist and naturalist.
- Storr →
- Such →
- Sundev → Carl Jakob Sundevall, a Swedish zoologist.
- Sw → William Swainson, an English ornithologist, malacologist, conchologist and entomologist.
- Swain → William Swainson
- Swains → William Swainson
- Sykes → William Henry Sykes, a British ornithologist.
- Tem → Coenraad Jacob Temminck
- Temm → Coenraad Jacob Temminck, a Dutch zoologist.
- Thunb →

== U to Z ==
- V → Nicholas Aylward Vigors or Louis Pierre Vieillot
- Vieill → Louis Pierre Vieillot, a French ornithologist.
- Vig → Nicholas Aylward Vigors, an Irish zoologist.
- Vigors → Nicholas Aylward Vigors
- Vog →
- Vögel →
- Vosm →
- W →
- Wagl → Johann Georg Wagler, a Geran herpetologist.
- White → Gilbert White, an English ornithologist and naturalist.
- Will → Francis Willughby (1635-1672), English ornithologist and ichthyologist
- Wils → Alexander Wilson, a Scottish American ornithologist and naturalist.
