= Clan Walkinshaw =

Scottish clan

Crest badge suitable to be worn by members of Clan Walkinshaw.

Clan Walkinshaw is a Scottish clan. It does not have a chief recognised by the Lord Lyon King of Arms therefore the clan has no standing under Scots Law. Clan Walkinshaw is considered an armigerous clan, meaning that it is considered to have had at one time a chief who possessed the chiefly arms, however no one at present is in possession of such arms.

The surname Walkinshaw is a habitational name derived from Walkinshaw in Renfrewshire. The name probably originates from the Scots elements wealcere "fuller" and sceaga "copse". Clan Walkinshaw descends from a Douglas who was a judge in the earldom of Lennox. In 1235 he made over his lands of Knock, and the Abbey of Paisley, for the lands of Walkinshaw. Members of the clan became hereditary foresters to the High Stewards of Scotland in the barony of Renfrew. The arms of Walkinshaw allude to this office of hereditary forester. The clan's lands were in possession of the principal family until they passed through an heiress to the Walkinshaws of Little Fulwood, and then later to the Walkinshaws of Garturk who subsequently styled themselves as "of that Ilk". Other cadet branches of Clan Walkinshaw were the Walkinshaws of Burrowfield and of Scotston. Today members of Clan Walkinshaw may wear a crest badge based upon the heraldry in the arms of Walkinshaw of that Ilk. The crest within the crest badge is a martlet, and the motto is IN SEASON.

== See also ==
- Walkinshaw, for people named Walkinshaw.
