= John Edgar Courtney =

Australian farmer and amateur ornithologist (1934–2025)

John Edgar Courtney (1934 – 7 July 2025) was an Australian farmer and amateur ornithologist. He helped put together the first Field Guide to Australian Birdsong, produced by the Bird Observers Club of Australia. Courtney joined the Royal Australasian Ornithologists Union (RAOU) in 1959 and was the RAOU's New England regional representative 1971–1978. In 1999 he was awarded the RAOU's John Hobbs Medal for outstanding contributions to Australian ornithology as an amateur. Courtney died on 7 July 2026, at the age of 91.

== See also ==
- List of ornithologists

== Sources ==
- Debus, Stephen. (1999). John Hobbs Medal 1999: Citation. John Edgar Courtney. Emu 99: 228.
- Robin, Libby. (2001). The Flight of the Emu: a hundred years of Australian ornithology 1901-2001. Carlton, Vic. Melbourne University Press. ISBN 0-522-84987-3
