= Glen Chilton =

Canadian-Australian scholar and author

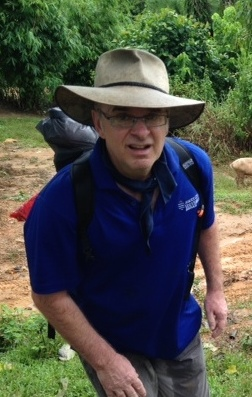
- Born: Glen Dean Chilton; 25 October 1958 (age 67); Toronto, Ontario
- Occupations: Author, ornithologist, professor
- Writing career
- Genres: Travel, Natural history, Humour
- Website: glenchilton.com

Glen Dean Chilton (born in 1958) is a Canadian-Australian scholar and author of humorous books on adventure travel and natural history.

Chilton is also an ornithologist. His first book The Curse of the Labrador Duck was a finalist in 2010 for the Stephen Leacock Medal for Humor and the William Saroyan International Prize for Writing. His second book, Attack of the Killer Rhodondendrons (a.k.a. The Last Place You'd Look for a Wallaby) achieved the Queensland, Australia best-seller list in 2013.

== Biography ==
Born in Canada, Chilton moved to Winnipeg, Manitoba with his family in 1967. He received a Bachelor of Science and a Master of Science degree in zoology from the University of Manitoba, and a PhD. He was professor of biology and ornithology at St. Mary's University College.

Chilton's areas of interest and scientific research include recent extinction events, particularly of bird species; the conservation of plant and animal species rediscovered after having been thought to be extinct.

== Travel writing ==
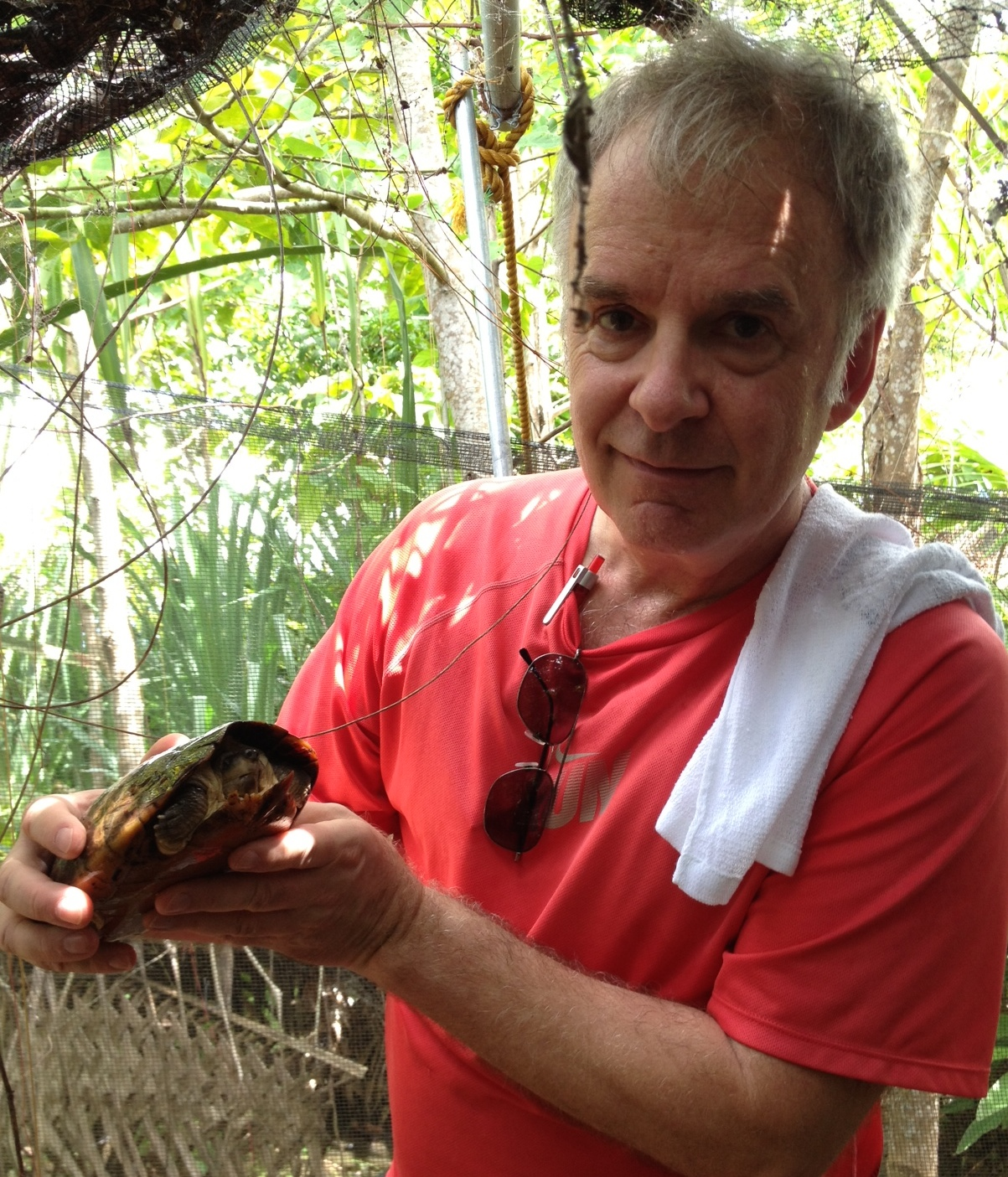
Chilton with a rediscovered Philippine forest turtle, S. leytensis, in 2013

On a quest to see all fifty-four stuffed Labrador duck specimens that remain in existence for his first book The Curse of the Labrador Duck, he travelled 72,018 miles by aircraft, 5,461 miles by train, 3,566 miles by car, 1,169 miles by bus and 43 miles by ferry. That distance is the equivalent of 3.3 times around the Earth. His second book, Attack of the Killer Rhodeodendrons (a.k.a. The Last Place You'd Look for a Wallaby), which examined plants and animal species that were introduced to foreign locations by humans, took him to six continents and fourteen countries

== Publications ==
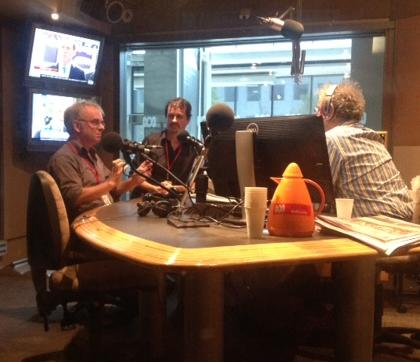
Chilton (left) in 2013 being interviewed on ABC Radio Melbourne's The Conversation Hour with Jon Faines, Melbourne, Australia

=== Non-fiction books ===
- Attack of the Killer Rhododendrons: My Obsessive Quest to Seek Out Alien Species (2012) HarperCollins Ltd, Toronto. ISBN 978-1-55468-364-2 (also published under the title The Last Place You’d Look for a Wallaby (2013). University of Queensland Press. St. Lucia, Queensland, Australia. ISBN 978-0-7022-4977-8)
- The Curse of the Labrador Duck: My Obsessive Quest to the Edge of Extinction (2009). HarperCollins Publishers Ltd, Toronto. ISBN 978-1-55468-363-5

=== Book chapters ===
- Chilton G (1997). Labrador Duck (Camptorhynchus labradorius). In: The Birds of North America, No. 307. (Poole A, Gills F, eds.) The Academy of Natural Sciences, Philadelphia, PA, and The American Ornithologists' Union, Washington, DC.
- Chilton G, Baker, MC, Barrentine CD, Cunningham MA (1995). White-crowned Sparrow (Zonotrichia leucophrys). In: The Birds of North America, No 183 (Poole A, Gill F, eds). The Academy of Natural Sciences, Philadelphia, PA, and The American Ornithologists' Union, Washington, DC.

=== Scientific journal publications ===
- Chilton G, Sorenson M (2007). Genetic identification of eggs purportedly from the extinct Labrador Duck (Camptorhynchus labradorius). Auk 124:962–968.
- Chilton G, Fuller E (2005). Views from the side of the bird: Users' perspectives on bird collections. Zoologische Mededelingen 79(3):131–136.
- Chilton G (2004). John James Audubon in the land that God forgot. Isotope 2(2):14–29.
- Chilton G, Wiebe MO, Handford P (2002). Large-scale geographic variation in songs of Gambel's White-crowned Sparrows. Condor 104:378–386.
- Chilton G (2002). Song stereoptypy and cultural evolution in an isolated population of Montane White-crowned Sparrows, Zonotrichia leucophrys oriantha. Bird Behavior 15:53–63.
- Chilton G, Vonhoff MJ, Peterson BV, and Wilson N (2000). Ectoparasitic insects of bats in British Columbia, Canada. Journal of Parasitology 86:191–192.
- Chilton G, Lein MR (1996). Long-term changes in songs and song dialect boundaries of Pudget Sound White-crowned sparrows. Condor 98:567–580.
- Chilton G, Galloway TD (1995). Fleas (Siphonaptera: Ceratophyllidae) from nests of White-crowned sparrows (Zonotrichia leucophrys) in southwestern Alberta, Canada. Can Entomol 127:443–444.
- Chilton G, Lein MR, Baptista LF (1990). Mate choice by female White-crowned sparrows in a mixed-dialect population. Behav Ecol Sociobiol 27:223–227.
- Chilton G, Sealy SG (1987). Species' roles in mixed-species feeding flocks of seabirds. J Field Ornithol. 58:456–463.

=== See also ===
- Labrador duck
- List of ornithologists
