= John Hobbs (ornithologist) =

British-Australian amateur ornithologist and police officer

John Nelson Hobbs
- Born: 1923; London, England
- Died: 31 October, 1990 (aged 66-67); Dareton, New South Wales
- Known for: involvement with Royal Australasian Ornithologists Union

John Nelson Hobbs (1923 – October 31, 1990) was a British-Australian career police officer and amateur ornithologist, best known for his involvement with the Royal Australasian Ornithologists Union.

== Early life ==
Hobbs was born in London, England in 1923. During World War II, he served as a gunner on tankers in the Atlantic Ocean. After the war, he joined the Metropolitan Police Force in London. In 1952, Hobbs emigrated to Australia and joined the NSW Police Force.

== Career ==
Hobbs served as a New South Wales police officer until 1980, based in a succession of country towns, including Dareton, Finley, Buronga, Katoomba, Kyogle, Nowra, and Narrandera. During this period, he developed an amateur interest in ornithology and made detailed studies of local birdlife, including the article "The birds of south-west New South Wales." Hobbs' interest in ornithology also extended into his law enforcement career; he diligently prosecuted illegal bird trappers and shooters in the districts where he was serving. Fellow ornithologist A.K. Morris later described Hobbs during this period as "a large blond police officer with a Kentish accent, bright blue eyes and a wry sense of humour."

In 1980, Hobbs retired to Dareton in the south-west of the state, where he studied reed-warblers and small passerines. He served on the Records Appraisal Committee of the Royal Australasian Ornithologists Union (RAOU) from 1975 to 1989, as well as contributing prolifically to the RAOU's Nest Record Scheme. Hobbs published his ornithological research in Australian Birds, The Australian Bird Watcher, British Birds, Corella and Emu.

== Death and legacy ==
In October 1990, while on a birding trip to Central Australia with James Allen Keast and others, Hobbs suffered a heart attack. He died on 31 October 1990, near Dareton, New South Wales. He was survived by his wife Shirley and four sons: Peter, Michael, Bruce, and Gregory. Hobbs is commemorated by the J.N. Hobbs Memorial Medal, awarded annually from 1995 for major contributions to amateur ornithology. The medal was initially awarded by the New South Wales branch of the Royal Australasian Ornithologists Union (now BirdLife Australia), before being upgraded to a national award four years later.

== See also ==
- List of ornithologists
