= Hussein Adan Isack =

Hussein Adan Isack (born 1957) is a naturalist and ethnobiologist living in Kenya, having been a research scientist in ornithology.

== Background and youth ==
Hussein Adan Isack was born to parents who lived in the pastoral Northern region of Kenya. Throughout his youth Hussein developed and cultivated a keen interest in bird watching and began keeping birds at his home.

His interest was further stimulated when he joined his high school where he met Paul Scholes, a biologist, himself an ardent birdwatcher from Liverpool. He reared falcons in school and would later become the leader of the wildlife clubs in his area. During his holidays, he would spend time pursuing his passion Later, he met Van Someren, an ornithologist with whom he worked with at the National Museum of Kenya paving way for a career spanning over 30 years.

He was later awarded the Christopher Welch Scholarship for Natural Sciences at Oxford University, where he studied zoology and majored in behavioral ecology. It was during this time that Hussein travelled extensively across the world and met Heinz Ulrich Reyer, a zoologist from Zurich. The two would become close friends and colleagues. He then made frequent trips to the North alongside Heinz, studying the behavioural patterns of birds in that area, specifically the honeyguide, a bird revered for its ability to locate and direct locals towards honey in the remote desert.

== Professional life ==
Having received his PhD in ornithology from Oxford, Hussein went back to Kenya where he worked as a scientist at the National Museum of Kenya. He became the head of the Ornithology department and co-ordinated research activities in the region.

He is a founding board member of the Ewaso Ng'iro Development Authority, appointed by H.E president Daniel Toroitich arap Moi, tasked with the responsibility of ensuring sustainable development of the water basin.

In 1991, he took part in the making of a documentary, The Trials of Life with sir David Attenborough, produced by the BBC and the Australian Broadcasting Service. It focused on the communication between humans and birds, specifically the honeyguide on which Hussein was known for his expertise.

Currently based in Kenya, he founded and runs the Kivulini Heritage Trust a Non-Governmental organization that seeks to preserve indigenous cultures and promote sustainable use of natural resources.
