= Stap =

Notable people with the surname Stap include:

- Don Stap (born 1949), American author
- Jacques Stap, Olympic coach for Dutch sailor Simon Korver
- Jan Woutersz Stap (1599–1663), Dutch Golden Age painter
- Leon Stap (1928 – 1976), American midget professional wrestler known as Fuzzy Cupid
- Sue Stap (born 1954), American professional tennis player
