= Úlice =

- Municipality
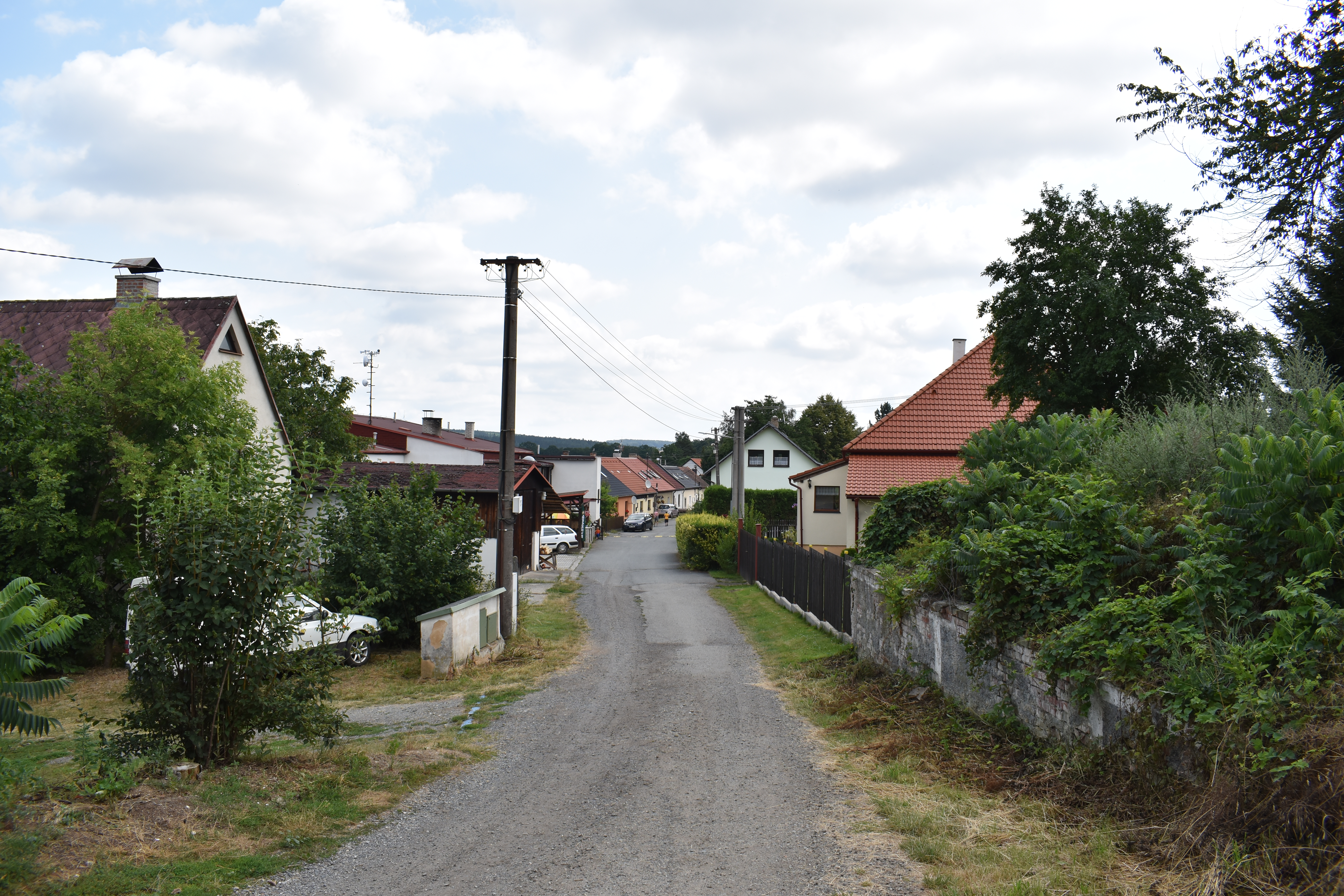
- Hracholusky, a part of Úlice

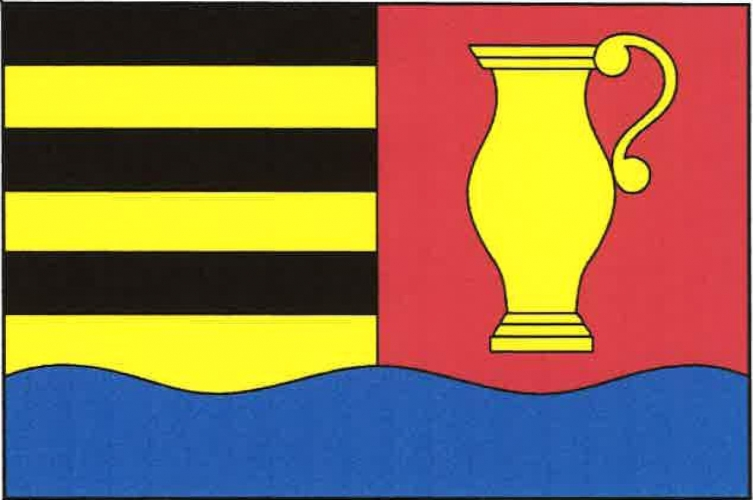
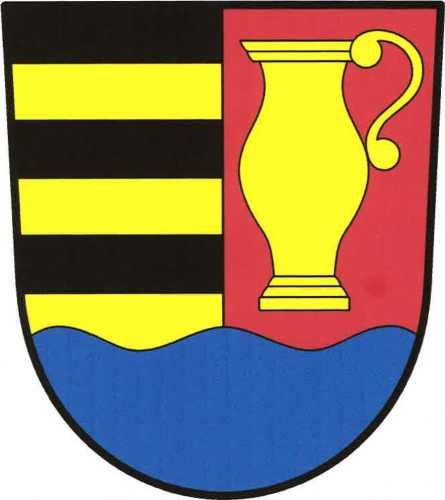
- Flag Coat of arms

- Location in the Czech Republic
- Coordinates: 49°45′39″N 13°8′54″E
- Country: Czech Republic
- Region: Plzeň
- District: Plzeň-North
- First mentioned: 1329

Area
  - Total: 13.24 km^{2} (5.11 sq mi)
- Elevation: 413 m (1,355 ft)

Population (2026-01-01)
  - Total: 485
  - Density: 36.6/km^{2} (94.9/sq mi)
- Time zone: UTC+1 (CET)
  - Summer (DST): UTC+2 (CEST)
- Postal code: 330 33
- Website: www.obeculice.cz

Úlice is a municipality and village in Plzeň-North District in the Plzeň Region of the Czech Republic. It has about 500 inhabitants.

Úlice lies approximately 18 kilometres (11 mi) west of Plzeň and 99 km (62 mi) west of Prague.

== Administrative division ==
Úlice consists of five municipal parts (in brackets population according to the 2021 census):

- Úlice (253)
- Hracholusky (91)
- Jezná (45)
- Kníje (22)
- Nová Jezná (69)

== Demographics ==
Historical population
Year	Pop.	±%
1869	819	—
1880	837	+2.2%
1890	844	+0.8%
1900	797	−5.6%
1910	843	+5.8%
1921	804	−4.6%
1930	901	+12.1%
1950	594	−34.1%
1961	557	−6.2%
1970	508	−8.8%
1980	448	−11.8%
1991	383	−14.5%
2001	406	+6.0%
2011	443	+9.1%
2021	480	+8.4%
Source: Censuses

== Notable people ==
- Robert von Dombrowski (1869–1932), ornithologist
- Markvart of Úlice (d. 1402), nobleman
