= Otto Widmann =

American ornithologist of German origin (1841–1933)

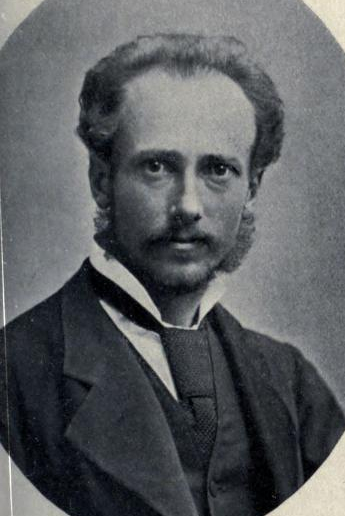
Otto Widmann c. 1883

Otto Widmann (June 15, 1841 – November 26, 1933) was an American ornithologist of German origin who was among the first to document the birds of the Missouri region. He published it in 1907 as a Preliminary Catalog of the Birds of Missouri after spending years to accumulate notes that were lost in a fire in 1905. He recorded the now restricted Bachman's sparrow in Missouri.

Widmann was born in Karlsruhe, Germany, to Christoph Friedrich and Catherine Baumann. His father was interested in plants and had assembled a large herbarium while working on the estate of the Grand Duke of Baden, an all round naturalist. When Widmann was young he had access to the private library of the Grand Duke and among these were Johann Friedrich Naumann's birds of Germany in 12 volumes with illustrations. At a young age Widmann went collecting bird eggs in the forests around his home but he did not find much time subsequently. Widmann began to study at the lyceum in Karlsruhe from the age of nine to sixteen after which he trained for the apothecary business. After apprenticing for a while he traveled around Europe before graduated in pharmacy in 1864. He then traveled again, learning French and English while studying botany and chemistry. In 1866 he moved to America where he worked as a drugstore clerk in Hoboken. He then moved around and settled in St. Louis in 1867 where he started a drugstore.

In 1871 he traveled back to Europe staying for nine months during which time he married Augusta Bender at Mannheim on March 5, 1872. In 1874 Augusta gifted her husband a copy of Birds of North America by Theodore Jasper and still later a cane gun for collecting specimens. He began to take a more serious interest in the local birds and published in several local journals while also being a member of the Audubon Society, the St. Louis Bird Club and the Wilson Ornithological Club. He especially took an interest in bird migration and distribution and kept careful notes in the hope of publishing a comprehensive catalogue of the birds of Missouri. In 1902 his house burned down while he was away in Europe, destroying all his manuscripts. He finally published a Preliminary Catalog of the Birds of Missouri in 1907.
