= Stephen Marchant (ornithologist) =

Stephen Marchant, AM (1912 – August 2003) was born in Staffordshire, studied geology at Gonville and Caius College, Cambridge, and worked in the oil exploration business in many countries, using the opportunities arising from his postings to study birdlife around the world. He wrote classic papers on the birds of the Red Sea, Nigeria, the Gold Coast, Indonesia, Borneo, Ecuador and Iraq. In 1963 he emigrated to Australia where he joined the Bureau of Mineral Resources in Canberra.

== Biography ==
Marchant was born in Weston-under-Lizard, a village in the English county of Staffordshire. In Australia, Marchant was immediately involved in organised ornithology through the Royal Australasian Ornithologists Union (RAOU) where he was a strong force for what he perceived to be necessary reform. Here he was instrumental in founding the ACT Group of the RAOU, which later became the Canberra Ornithologists Group (COG). He also initiated the RAOU Nest Record Scheme and was a founding member of the RAOU Field Investigations Committee. As part of a reformist makeover of the RAOU, in order to strengthen its scientific rigor and ornithological credibility, in 1968 he became Editor of the RAOU's journal the Emu, which he transformed into an internationally respected scientific journal.

Following a 12-year stint as Emu Editor, he turned his attention to a new project, a comprehensive handbook of Australian birds, an endeavour which expanded in scope to become the Handbook of Australian, New Zealand and Antarctic Birds (HANZAB) of which he was the editor-in-chief of the first two volumes.

For most of his later years from 1975, he lived at Moruya in the Eurobodalla Shire of the NSW South Coast. Here, he continued to be active in natural history, helping found the Eurobodalla Natural History Society in 1986, serving as its President as well as editor of its journal Nature in Eurobodalla. Stephen Marchant's earlier ornithological work resulted in the award of the British Ornithologists' Union Medal in 1971 and, later, his election as a Corresponding Fellow of the American Ornithologists' Union. Appreciation for his service to the RAOU led to him being elected a Fellow of the RAOU in 1975. His contribution to Australian ornithology was recognised by his being made an Honorary Member in the General Division of the Order of Australia (AM) in 1994, and by being awarded the RAOU's John Hobbs Medal in 1997. Marchant died in August 2003, at a nursing home between the New South Wales towns of Moruya and Narooma.

== See also ==
- List of ornithologists
