= Markovsky, Volgograd Oblast =

Markovsky Марковский
- Settlement
- Location within Volgograd Oblast Location within Russia
- Coordinates: 50°24′N 41°35′E
- Country: Russia
- Region: Volgograd Oblast
- District: Nekhayevsky District
- Time zone: UTC+4:00

Markovsky (Russian: Марковский) is a rural locality (a settlement) in Verkhnerechenskoye Rural Settlement, Nekhayevsky District, Volgograd Oblast, Russia. The population was 13 as of 2010.

== Geography ==
Markovsky is located on the bank of the Tishanka River, 14 km west of Nekhayevskaya (the district's administrative centre) by road. Avraamovsky is the nearest rural locality.
