= Markovskoye, Sokolsky District, Vologda Oblast =

Markovskoye Марковское
- Village
- Location within Vologda Oblast Location within Russia
- Coordinates: 59°25′N 40°27′E
- Country: Russia
- Region: Vologda Oblast
- District: Sokolsky District
- Time zone: UTC+3:00

Markovskoye (Russian: Марковское) is a rural locality (a village) and the administrative center of Pelshemskoye Rural Settlement, Sokolsky District, Vologda Oblast, Russia. The population was 505 as of 2002. There are 7 streets.

== Geography ==
Markovskoye is located 34 km east of Sokol (the district's administrative centre) by road. Mikhalevo is the nearest rural locality.
