= Veleslav Wahl =

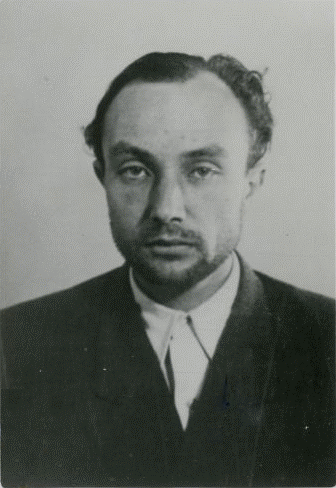
Wahl in 1949 or 1950

Veleslav Wahl (15 May 1922 – 16 June 1950) was a Czech ornithologist and resistance activist who was executed in 1950.

== Biography ==
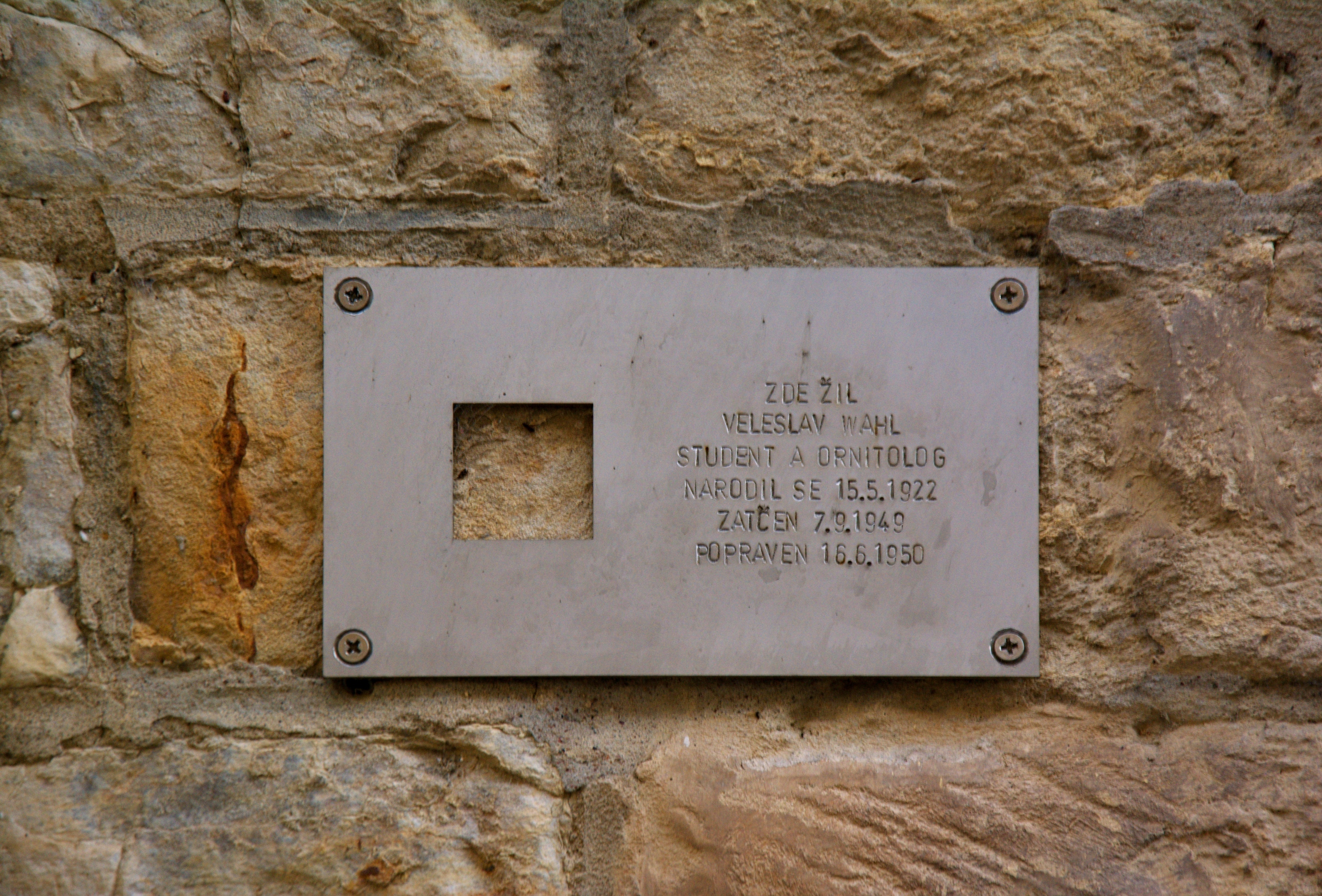
Veleslav Wahl memorial plaque in Prague 1, Úvoz 13

Veleslav Wahl was born on 15 May 1922 in Prague. He was named after his father, a Prague lawyer, who was born in 1891 and killed in 1942 by the Nazis. As a child Veleslav went to a local grammar school in Bělá pod Bezdězem. He also worked in the Prague Zoo from 1941 to 1944 while also working in the underground Czech resistance. When the war ended he studied law at Charles University. He was also active in the Prague uprising as a student activist. He established an anti-communist organization along with Jaromír Nechanský which collaborated with the Office of Strategic Services, particularly the American secretary Walter Birge who was posted to the Prague embassy. For this he was arrested in 1949 and sentenced to death after a trial. He and Nechanský were executed in Pankrác Prison on 16 June 1950. The Wahl-Nechanský trial also led to the Czechoslovak government notifying the Americans that their embassy was too large due to their espionage activities and ordered them to reduce it to a third of its size. His wife, Tatiána Růžičková, was also kept under arrest and she later moved to the United States.

A memorial to Wahl and others executed and tortured from the 1950s was established at Prague-Ďáblice, and in 2000, he was posthumously awarded the Honorary Medal of T. G. Masaryk by the Masaryk Democratic Movement. In 1995 he was posthumously decorated with the Order of the White Lion (Civil Division, Second Class). In 2017, a memorial plaque was installed on the Swedish embassy where he had lived before his execution.

Wahl wrote a landmark work on the birds of Prague (Pražské ptactvo), published first in 1944 with a second edition in 1945.
