= Robert von Dombrowski =

Czech ornithologist

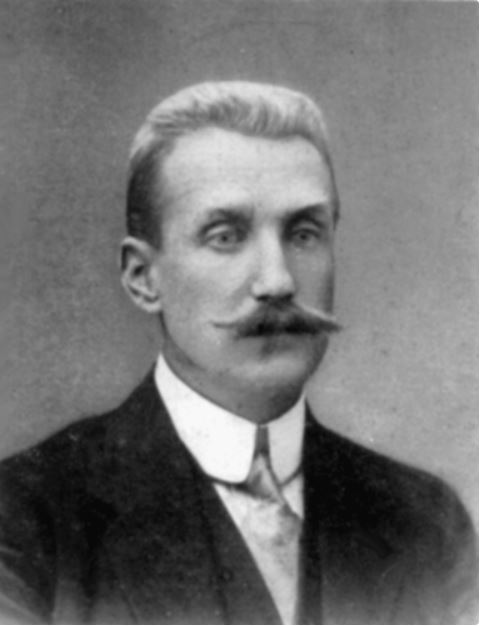

Robert Ritter von Dombrowski (2 April 1869 – 15 October 1932) was a Czech ornithologist. He was the author of Ornis Romaniae (1912) and contributed to the eight volume treatise on hunting and forestry "Allgemeine Encyklopädie der gesammten Forst- und Jagdwissenschaften" edited by his father Raoul Ritter von Dombrowski.

== Biography ==
Robert was born in Úlice near Plzeň in which was then in Austria-Hungary. He studied at Kalksburg College but left without completing as his father Raoul von Dombrowski went bankrupt, lost most of his wealth in 1872, and retired in 1882. Raoul von Dombrowski was the editor of an eight volume treatise on forestry and hunting "Allgemeine Encyklopädie der gesammten Forst- und Jagdwissenschaften" which was completed in 1894, the last volume assisted by Robert. Along with his brother Ernst (1862–1917), Robert worked at the Sarajevo Museum. Another brother Carl became a painter and writer. Robert was employed in 1895 by Grigore Antipa at the Bucharest Museum as a specimen preparator. He collected specimens for the museum and helped in developing the public exhibits. His work Ornis Romaniae consisted of 924 pages and covered 347 bird species of Romania.

Dombrowski's career was interrupted by accusations that he encouraged the hunting and destruction of birds apart from selling specimens abroad. With the onset of World War I, Dombrowski, of Austrian origin was forced to move out of Romania. His collections went to the Grigore Antipa Museum.
