= Sushma Reddy (ornithologist) =

Indian ornithologist

Sushma Reddy is an Indian ornithologist, who serves as chair of ornithology at the Bell Museum of Natural History in the US state of Minnesota, having been made a fellow of the American Ornithological Society in 2018. She discovered one new species and two new genera of birds in the Western Ghats of India.
