= Theodore Jasper =

American painter

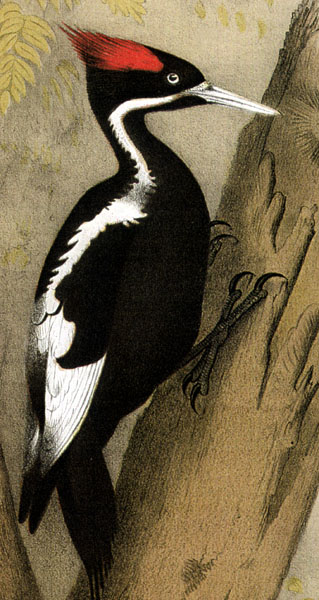
Ivory-billed Woodpecker by Theodore Jasper, from Studer's Popular Ornithology

Theodore Jasper (13 July 1814, in Prussia – 6 June 1897, in Columbus, Ohio) was a portrait painter and photographic colorist active in Columbus, Ohio from circa 1866 to 1883. From the 1840s to the 1860s he worked in New York and Connecticut (Haverstock, 2000). His paintings formed the basis for Studer's Popular Ornithology, a late 19th-century work that had several editions with chromolithographic copies of Jasper's art.

== References and external links ==
- Theodore Jasper – Cornell University
- Birds of North America (1903 edition of Studer's Popular Ornithology) from University of Wisconsin, Digital Library for the Decorative Arts and Material Culture
- Mary Sayre Haverstock, Jeannette Mahoney Vance, Brian L. Meggitt, Jeffrey Weidman (2000). Artists in Ohio, 1787–1900: a biographical dictionary. Kent State University Press. ISBN 0-87338-616-7, ISBN 978-0-87338-616-6 (via Google Books)
