= Jacob H. Studer =

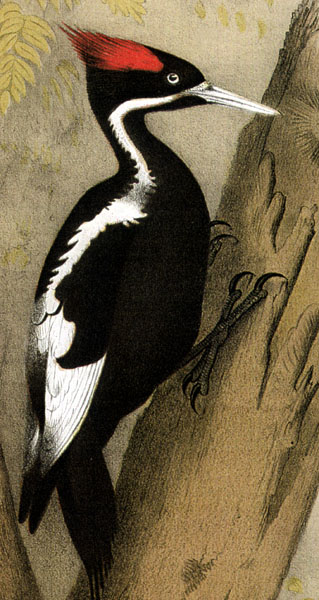
Ivory-billed Woodpecker by Theodore Jasper, from Studer's Popular Ornithology

Jacob Henry Studer (26 February 1840 Columbus, Ohio - 2 August 1904 New York City) was a printer, lithographer, painter, and popular ornithologist active in Columbus, Ohio from the 1860s to the 1880s. He was also the author of a work entitled Columbus, Ohio; its History, Resources, and Progress (1873). He founded the Board of Trade of Columbus in 1872 (New York Times, 1904).

Studer was active in the American Ornithologists' Union and the Ohio Society of New York. Later in his life, Studer resided in New York City (Haverstock, 2000; New York Times, 1904), apparently as early as 1887 (New York Times, 1887). He is best known as the author of Studer's Popular Ornithology. This work had several editions, published over the period 1874 to 1903 (Cornell University). It was illustrated with chromolithographs after paintings by Theodore Jasper.

Studer died in his office (Manhattan Building, 96th 5th Avenue), where he also lived at the time. A son, James Studer, survived him (New York Times, 1904). Other members of his family predeceased him: Caroline Buss Studer (died 2 September 1871, age 30), daughters Mary Francisca and Anna Regina (both died April, 1876, ages 11 and 13), and another son John Bernard Studer (died 11 May 1901, age 32), according to the dedication page of the 1903 edition of Studer's Popular Ornithology.

== References and external links ==
- Theodore Jasper--Cornell University
- Birds of North America (1903 edition of Studer's Popular Ornithology) from University of Wisconsin, Digital Library for the Decorative Arts and Material Culture
- Mary Sayre Haverstock, Jeannette Mahoney Vance, Brian L. Meggitt, Jeffrey Weidman (2000). Artists in Ohio, 1787-1900: a biographical dictionary. Kent State University Press. ISBN 0-87338-616-7, ISBN 978-0-87338-616-6 (via Google Books)
- MR. STUDER'S PICTURE. New York Times, May 24, 1887, p. 8 Article link—court case over damage to a painting owned by Studer, said to be work of Salvator Rosa
- ART CRITICS DO NOT AGREE. New York Times, May 25, 1887, p. 8 Article link—further account of trial
- "AGED ORNITHOLOGIST FOUND DEAD IN OFFICE". The New York Times. August 3, 1904. p. 7.
- Studer, 1873. Columbus, Ohio; its History, Resources, and Progress. Columbus, Ohio, 584 pp. Google Books
