= Jan Szczepski =

Jan Bogusław Szczepski (12 December 1910 – 12 December 2011) was a Polish ornithologist. He was the founder of the Gdañsk ornithological research station and conducted studies on bird migration.

Szczepski was born in Warsaw and grew up in Poznañ where he went to high school. In 1933 he became a ringer and began to study agriculture at the University of Poznan but his studies were interrupted in 1939 by World War II. He served in the underground home army and took part in the Warsaw Uprising. After 1945 he graduated as an agricultural engineer. In 1946 he joined the polish ringing centre and began to reorganize the activities and setting up a network of ringers across the country. He also examined the role of birds in control of the Colorado beetle (Leptinotarsa decemlineata). In 1957 he established a ringing centre in Górki Wschodnie, Sobieszewo Island near Gdañsk and worked there until his retirement in 1976. He published extensively both in scientific journals and in the popular media.
