= Ede Czynk =

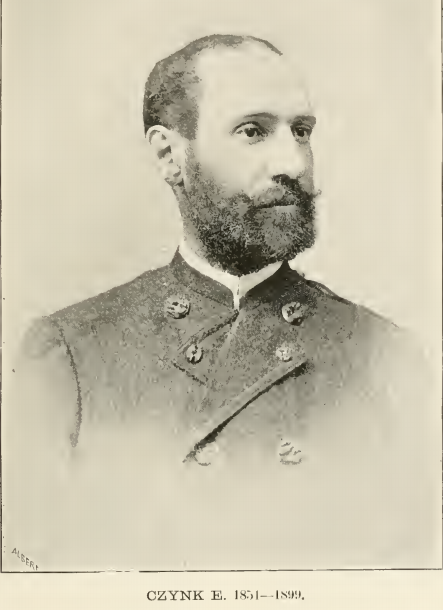
Ede Czynk

Eduard von Czynk or Ede Czynk (29 September 1851 – 20 January 1899) was a Transylvanian and Hungarian civil servant who worked in the post and telegraph department, a sports hunter, and ornithologist. He published mainly in Hungarian and German.

== Life and work ==
Czynk was born in Kronstadt, Transylvania, where his father was a customs officer who was also famous as a hunter of bear and chamois in the Southern Carpathians. Travel with his father made him interested in nature from a young age. He went to Saxon Evangelical and Roman Catholic secondary schools and one of his teachers was Wilhelm Hausmann (1822–1900), who was also a noted ornithologist. After high school at Kronstadt, Czynk joined the civil service and worked as a postal clerk, first at Brașov. In 1879 he was posted to Budapest and in 1883 to Fogarasch where he was head of the post and telegraph office. Here he collaborated with Alexander Florstedt and became involved in chamois conservation. He also began to study bird migration and collected from the region. In 1890, as part of preparations for the 2nd International Ornithological Congress in Budapest the next year, he began to work with Otto Herman to publish a book on bird migration in Hungary. After the creation of the Hungarian Ornithological Centre he became an observer there and was involved in studies on the lammergeier, the black grouse and other birds. His work went into the annual reports published by Viktor Ritter von Tschusi zu Schmidhoffen. He also wrote book on hunting, the first of which was on bears, but the most famous being in German Die Hohe Jagd (1898). He wrote to hunting periodicals as well. He also published monographs on woodcock (1896), capercaillie (1897) and waterfowl (1898). Czynk's bird collections included well-prepared skins that Stefan von Chernel wrote admiringly on. He married Elisabeth Meld in 1878 and they had three children. Towards the end of his career he was posted back into his home town of Kronstadt but he did not live long after that and died from a kidney ailment.
