= Erich Rutschke =

German ornithologist and conservationist

Erich Rutschke (26 May 1926 – 12 February 1999) was a German ornithologist and conservationist who specialized in wetland birds and their biology. Rutschke was responsible for making East Germany a signatory of the Ramsar Convention.

Rutschke was born in Neu-Golm, Bad Saarow in Germany. During the war he served as a paratrooper and was wounded. He became a teacher in 1946. He was interested in birds from childhood but took an interest in ornithology as a career after meeting Erwin Stresemann. He received a PhD for his work on water resistance in plumage in 1958 which included studies on the feathers of penguins. He became a professor of animal physiology at Potsdam and later became a professor at the Pedagogical Highschool in 1991.

He took an interest in waterbirds and the conservation of their habitats establishing a waterbird research centre in East Germany in 1967 and conducting bird censuses. He conducted research on greylag geese and their migration. Rutschke helped make the German Democratic Republic a signatory to the Ramsar Convention on 31 July 1978.

During the Cold War years, he was actively watched by Stasi intelligence agents and informants who followed him to Ornithological Congresses. One intelligence agent reported that while in Hungary, Rutschke had invited Sir "Walter Scott" (actually Sir Peter Scott) and other foreign delegates into his room in order to celebrate and sing (Rutschke was known for his voice) and therefore considered to have broken protocol.

He published books on wild geese, ducks, the swans of Europe and a monograph on the cormorant.
