= Vasily N. Skalon =

Vasily Nikolaevich Skalon or V.N. Skalon [Василий Николаевич Скалон] (12 May 1903 - 2 February 1976) was a Russian ornithologist, game biologist, conservationist, and explorer who helped in the early efforts to save Lake Baikal and Siberian habitats. He served as a professor at the Irkutsk State Agricultural Academy.

== Life and work ==
Skalon was born in Bugulma, Samara in a family of lawyers. His father Nikolai was a lawyer and an outdoor enthusiast while his mother Sofia came from the Rychkov family known for their eminence in academia and geographic exploration. His paternal grandfather Vasily was an economist who had served in Moscow and was associated with many major periodicals. In 1913 Skalon went to school where he took an interest in nature studies. In 1919 he was in Novosibirsk, taken care of by his mother after his father was shot dead by Bugulma Cheka on charges of "conspiracy in St. Nicholas Cathedral" in the end of 1918. He earned a living as an office assistant and courier. In 1920 he spent time in the provincial museum run by the painter taxidermist Anzimirov. He also took part in amateur scientist societies. In 1922 he joined Tomsk University to study medicine where he was also taught by Hermann Johansen. In 1923 he worked at the Novosibirsk biological station and taught at the Tomsk orphanage. Towards the end of 1924 there were purges in the university of persons who came from the former ruling elite but Skalon escaped by joining the Russian Geographical Society on an expedition into the steppe Altai in 1924. In 1925 he worked in the Siberian Plant Protection Station. In 1926 he returned to continue his studies at Tomsk University. He also took an interest in hunting and the biology of game animals. He established the Siberian Ornithological Society and its journal Uragus. He took part in several expeditions that collected fauna and published his research. In 1934 Skalon was sent to study plague in parts of the Transbaikal and Mongolia during which time he studied rodents and their parasites. He then worked at the Yakutsk Zonal Station. He received a science degree in 1938 from Moscow University. He was drafted into the army and served in an anti-plague unit. In 1945 he was invited to head the department of biology in Ulan Bator. He received his doctorate from Potemkin Pedagogical Institute, Moscow in 1946-47 for his work on beavers of north Asia. He then became a professor at the Irkutsk Agricultural Institution from 1948 to 1962 and worked at the Kazakh Pedagogical Institute in Alma-Ata before returning to Irkutsk in 1968.

Skalon was the member of numerous scientific societies and government committees. Skalon was instrumental in the establishment of several state reserves. One of the most influential works was Okhraniaite prirodu! (1958) ("Defend Nature!") in which he pointed out a number of dangers to Lake Baikal including the risk of letting timber sink into it as they were floated across it by loggers. He spoke on radio and television. Skalon was married three times, first to Olga Ivanovna Ivanova, a parasitologist, second to Tatiana Georgievna Linnik and then to Tatiana Nikolaevna Gagina. Skalon died in the city of Kemerovo where he was buried. One of his sons, Nikolai Vasilievich (born 1956) also became a biologist. A commemorative plaque was installed at the Irkutsk Agricultural Institute in 1991.
