= C. Douglas Deane =

Irish ornithologist

Campbell Douglas Deane (c.1910 Belfast – June 1992) O.B.E., M.Sc., F.L.S. was an Irish ornithologist. His father Arthur Deane M.R.I A., F.R.S.E, a botanist, was curator of the then Belfast Museum and Art Gallery from 1905 to 1942. C. D. Deane, known as Jimmy, was educated at Methodist College Belfast (1925–1931). He joined the museum in 1932, was promoted to Keeper of Natural History in 1950 and was from 1957 Deputy Director and the Keeper of Natural Science in the, by then, Ulster Museum. He served in the Royal Air Force in Peterborough and in the Royal Flying Corps Canada during the Second World War.

He was a member of various Government committees and other organisations relating to nature conservation. He wrote regular popular nature articles in the Irish Times, Belfast Telegraph and the Belfast News Letter (Deane, 1983). and contributed photographs to Animal and Zoo Magazine published by the Zoological Society of London in the 1930s. He specialised in the birds and mammals of Ireland, and was a member of the Ulster Society for the Protection of Birds (later incorporated into the RSPB) and had a keen interest in the history of naturalists in Ireland notably John Templeton and William Thompson. For most of his life he was, among other things, a dedicated wildlife photographer and film maker. He received an honorary degree of Master of Science from the Queen's University of Belfast in 1974.In 1975 he was elected a Fellow of the Linnean Society and was presented with an O.B.E. on Her Majesty's 1977 visit to Northern Ireland and retired in the same year.

== Publications ==
partial list

- Deane, C. Douglas. 1951. Hare breeding beneath a hut. Irish Naturalists' Journal. 10: 197.
- Deane, C. Douglas. 1952. The "black" rat in the north of Ireland. Irish Naturalists' Journal. 10: 296–298.
- Deane, C. Douglas. 1952. Pine martens in Counties Tyrone and Down. Irish Naturalists' Journal. 10: 303.
- Deane, C. Douglas. 1955. Note on myxomatosis in hares. Bulletin of the Mammal Society of the British Isles. 3: 20.
- Deane, C. Douglas. 1955. Myxo empties the burrows - but what next: Belfast Telegraph 5 April.
- Deane, C. Douglas. 1962. Life of the wild. Belfast Telegraph, 19 September.
- Deane, C. Douglas. 1962b. Irish Golden Eagles and a link with Scotland. British Birds, 55: 272–274.
- Deane, C. Douglas. 1964. The outdoor world. An Irish naturalist. The Irish Times 6 February: 10.
- Deane, C. Douglas. 1964. Introduced mammals in Ireland. Bulletin of the Mammal Society of the British Isles. 21: 2.
- Deane, C. Douglas with 1969-1976 Nash. R. Ulster Museum Information Sheets : Birds of Ireland; Bird habitats in Ireland; Terns and Gulls; The Eider, Mammals of Ireland; Lough Erne; Strangford Lough, William Thompson; etc (over 50 some cyclostyled).
- Deane, C. Douglas. 1971. Mammals of Strangford Lough. in Anon (Editor) Strangford Lough. 22–23. National Trust. Belfast.
- Deane, C. Douglas. Northern Ireland and its birds. in Ruttledge, R. F. 1966. Ireland's Birds. H. F. & G. Witherby Ltd.
- Deane, C. Douglas. 1973. Still no respite for the badger. News Letter (Belfast). 4 December.
- Deane, C. Douglas. 1974. Mystery of the mice and an island. News Letter. (Belfast). 24 August.
- Deane, C. Douglas. 1974. A rare type of man - and his friend. Belfast News Letter 12 August.
- Deane, C. Douglas. 1974. Airport hares have taken flight. Belfast News Letter. 19 October.
- Deane, C. Douglas. 1974. On the wild kingdom of Great Saltee. Belfast News Letter 7 December.
- Deane, C. Douglas. 1975. Upside-down world of the hairy armed bat. Belfast News Letter. 8 February.
- Deane, C. Douglas. 1976. Let's be fair to the hare. Belfast News Letter. 20 March.
- Deane, C. Douglas. 1983. The Ulster Countryside. Century Books. Belfast.
- Deane, C. Douglas and O'Gorman, F. 1969. The spread of feral mink in Ireland. Irish Naturalists' Journal. 16: 198–202.

See Irish natural history literature online for full list of science publications.

Published photos and film

- in Edward Allworthy Armstrong Bird Display: An Introduction to the Study of Bird Psychology ISBN 9781107511576

Film footage by Deane was used in the RSPB film Birds of the Grey Wind narrated by Denys Hawthorne (1970)
