= Eliel Jonathan Warén =

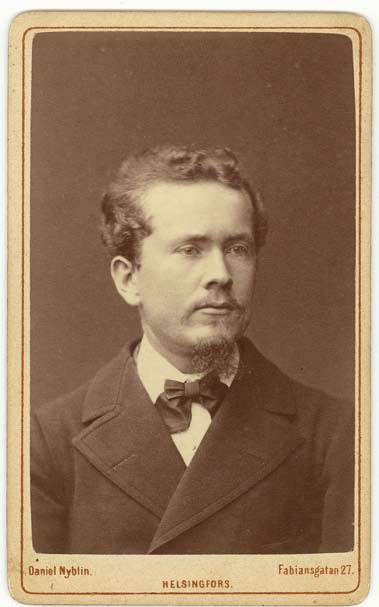

Eliel Jonathan Warén (28 November 1854 – 24 March 1928) was a Finnish physician and ornithologist. An active Finnish nationalist, he was involved in translating several books into Finnish, edited periodicals, and was a founding member of the Finnish Medical Society, Duodecim, in 1881. He was also involved in modernism and critiqued the conservatism of the church and supporting freedom of expression.

Warén was born in Pielisjärvi, Lieksa. His father pastor Johannes (Johan) Waris was the son of landlord Iisakki Varis of Istunmäki in Rautalammi. His mother was Adolfina Maria Aschan. The surname Warén was given when he joined school. He studied at Kuopio high school in 1874 where the Fennoman movement had a strong influence on his interest in the Finnish literature. He then went to study medicine at the University of Helsinki. While at university, he and his brothers were active in the first Finnish-language choir. He graduated in philosophy in 1878, and medicine in 1881 and became a licentiate in 1886. In 1881 he was a founder of the Duodecim Society which promoted medical education in Finnish. His brother Aron (1867–1933) also became a physician and joined the Society. He translated an auscultation manual written by Rene Laennec into Finnish in 1881 to demonstrate how technical material could be translated. Other members of the society included Aukusti Juhana Mela. He worked as a physician in Viitasaari and Keuruu before becoming district physician at Jyväskylä (1892). He moved to Salo in 1906 and remained there until his retirement.

Warén designed an aspirator for managing pleural pneumonia. The vacuum system was designed when his oldest son had a gun-shot accidental in 1901 in which his lung was punctured. In 1903 he was able to develop it further and by then had discovered similar German systems.

Warén translated a first-aid manual of the Red Cross into Finnish in 1885. He had an interest in the flora and fauna of the Suonenjoki region and wrote several papers. He hunted and collected bird specimens and contributed these to the Kuopio Museum and the Helsinki University museum. He was a member of the Societas pro Fauna et Flora Fennica.

He married Elina Amanda Ignatius (1867–1926) in 1888 and they had five sons and adopted the daughter of his brother.
