= Van Someren =

Van Someren is a surname. Notable people with the surname include:

- Barend van Someren (1572–1632), Dutch painter
- Ellinor Catherine Cunningham van Someren (1915–1988), British-Kenyan medical entomologist
- Haya van Someren (1926–1980), Dutch politician
- Hendrick van Someren (c. 1611–1685), Dutch painter
- Nicko van Someren (born 1967), British computer scientist
- Victor Van Someren (1886–1976), Australian-born zoologist and entomologist
- William van Someren (1876–1939), English cricketer and soldier
