= James Mortimer Southwick =

American naturalist and educator

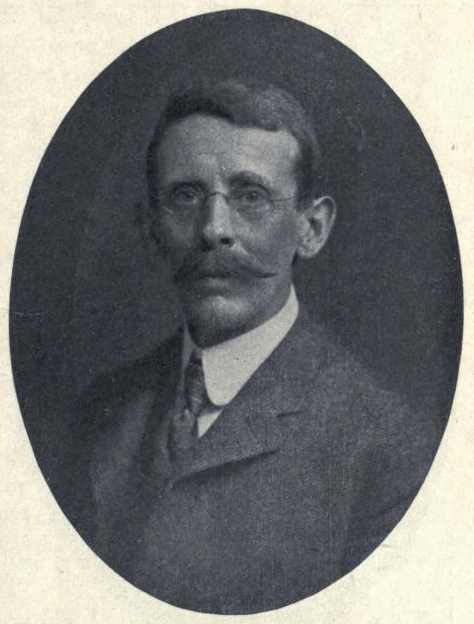
Portrait from Bird Lore (1903)

James Mortimer Southwick (July 10, 1846 - June 3, 1904) was an American naturalist and educator who lived in Providence. He established a natural history store and founded the periodical Random Notes on Natural History (1884–86). After selling off his natural history store in 1896 he served as a curator of the Roger Williams Park Museum and served as a State Entomologist. He was the first to note the differences between the willet populations in North America, leading to the description of the subspecies inornata by William Brewster.

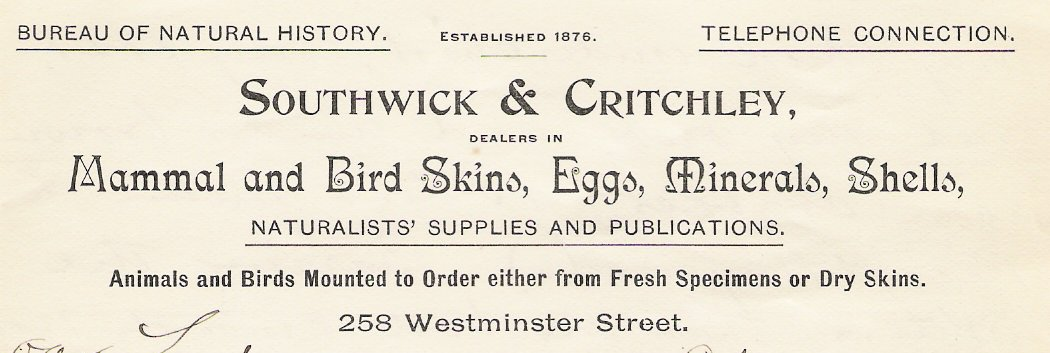
Cover letter for the shop, from Mr Southwick's own archives, given by his great great grand daughter

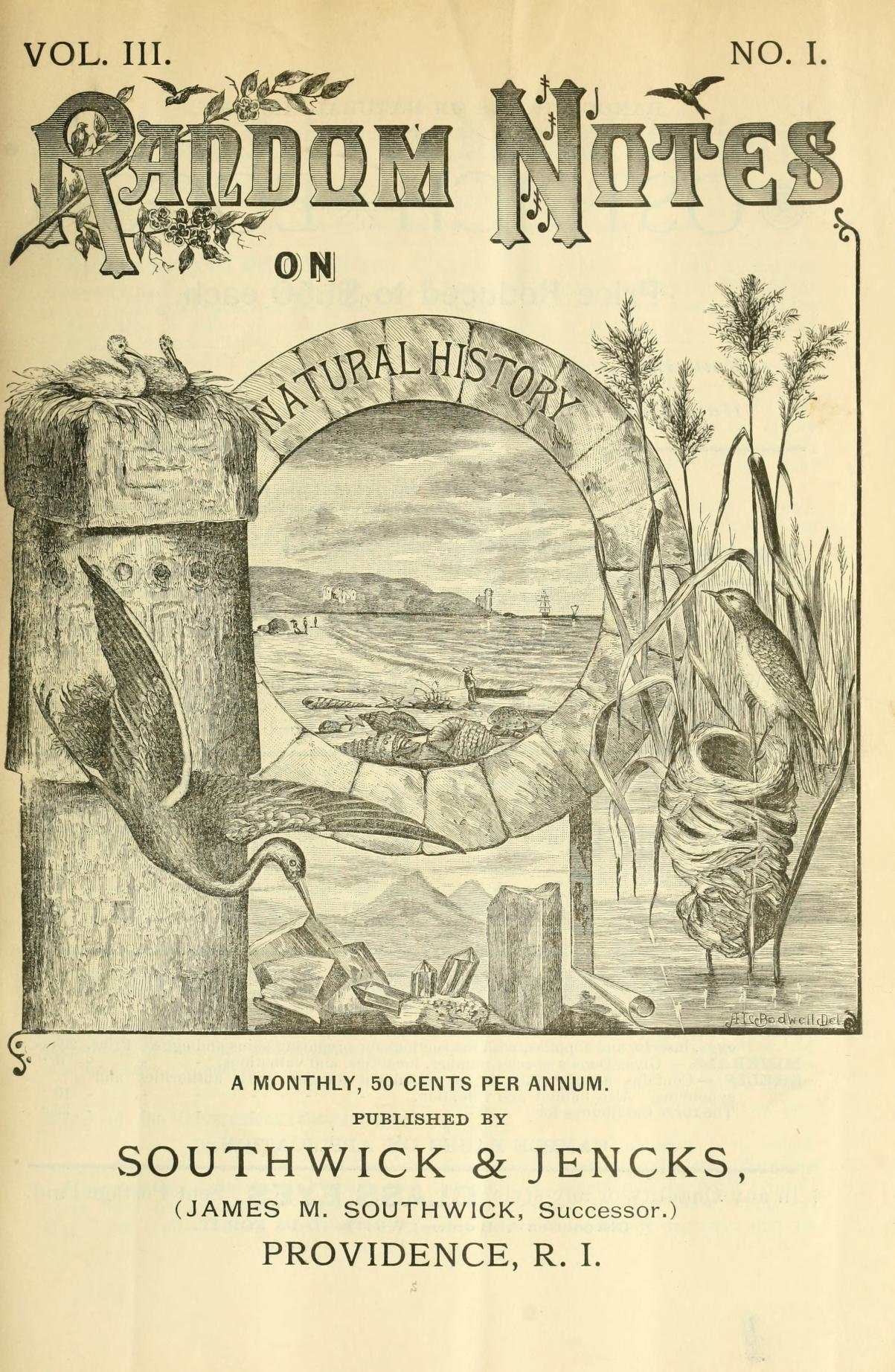
Cover of Random Notes on Natural History (1886)

Southwick was born in Newburyport to James M. Southwick and Sarah Martin and went to study at local public schools before moving to Providence at the age of sixteen. Southwick helped run a dry goods store that his uncle Jacob H. Martin had established but he kept a small stock of specimens with a hobby interest in natural history. In 1876 he met nineteen year old Frederick Tingley Jencks who had gathered the skills of taxidermy from J.W.P. Jenks of Brown University. Continuing to work in his uncle's store, Southwick partnered with Jencks to set up a store, named Southwick & Jencks' Natural History Store, on December 1, 1876, that dealt in natural history specimens. They sold minerals, eggs, bird skins, tools and supplies for taxidermists and naturalists. Jencks spent his time running the store and collaborated with Robert Ridgway, with the latter having a right to pick any rare specimens first. In 1886 Jencks suffered from an eye ailment and quit the firm leaving Southwick to partner with J. William Critchley, formerly employed by Henry A. Ward in his taxidermy company.

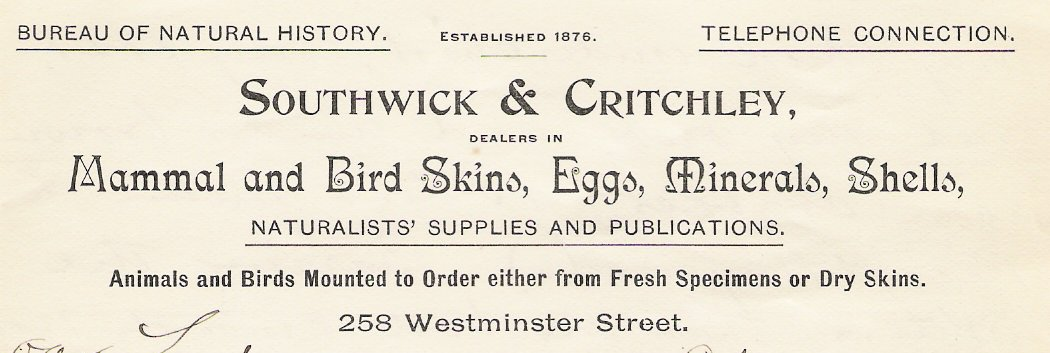
Cover letter for the shop, from Mr Southwick's own archives, given by his great great grand daughter

In 1894 the firm was sold off to Walter A. Angell and Harry A. Cash who renamed the store to Angell & Cash. Southwick then became a curator at the Roger Williams Park Museum in Providence in 1896. Here he set up a collection of the birds of the region which he called the "Rhode Island Room" and also took a special interest in applied entomology. As State Entomologist and member of the Tree Protection Society he took a special interest in gypsy moths, elm leaf beetles and the San Jose scale which were threats to the local trees and crops. He was also a member of other groups including the Audubon Society, the Tree-Protection Society, the Rhode Island Horticultural Society and St. John's AF & AM Lodge. Suffering from poor health he went to Rhode Island Hospital on May 26, 1904, and died of heart failure on June 3.

The North American subspecies of the willet, inornata which differed from the nominate subspecies, was first noted by Southwick and formally described by William Brewster.
