= Markovsky, Republic of Bashkortostan =

Markovsky Марковский
- Village
- Location within Bashkortostan Location within Russia
- Coordinates: 53°51′N 55°59′E
- Country: Russia
- Region: Bashkortostan
- District: Sterlitamaksky District
- Time zone: UTC+5:00

Markovsky (Russian: Марковский) is a rural locality (a village) in Podlesnensky Selsoviet, Sterlitamaksky District, Bashkortostan, Russia. The population was 1 as of 2010. There are 2 streets.

== Geography ==
Markovsky is located 31 km north of Sterlitamak (the district's administrative centre) by road. Strelkovka is the nearest rural locality.
