= Walther Bacmeister =

German jurist and ornithologist (1873–1966)

Walther Bacmeister (also spelled Walter; 21 February 1873 – 14 June 1966) was a German jurist and ornithologist.

== Biography ==
Bacmeister was descended from the Württemberg line of the Bacmeister family, an old Lower Saxony family with many distinguished members in the fields of medicine and the law. He was born in Niederstetten, the son of Karl Albert Wilhelm Bacmeister (1845–1920) and Auguste Gertz (1845–1929). After completing his Abitur he initially sought a military officer's career, but then decided to study law. After his state exams and trainee years, Bacmeister received an appointment as prosecutor in Heilbronn in 1905. He remained in this post until 1928, interrupted only by his military service with the rank of Hauptmann on both the Eastern and Western Fronts during the First World War. In 1928 he accepted a call to Stuttgart, where he held the office of chief prosecutor until his retirement in 1938. Some years later, during the course of the Second World War, he worked sporadically as a judge.

From an early age, Bacmeister was interested in birds and the science of ornithology, and here in particular the protection of native bird species in Baden-Württemberg. Even during his military operations, observing birds was his hobby, and he wrote detailed publications about the occurrence of different species of birds. He collaborated with a number of other amateur ornithologists, including Otto Kleinschmidt. During his Stuttgart years, he edited the annual reviews of the Vereins für Vaterländische Naturkunde in Württemberg, as well as a comprehensive directory of ornithological literature in Württemberg. These provide a catalogue of the works of Theodor von Heuglin, Christian Ludwig Landbeck, David Friedrich Weinland, and other Württemberg naturalists. He provided extensive material to the State Museum of Natural History Stuttgart and Vogelwarte Radolfzell, which formed the basis for much later research. Bacmeister was a member of the German Ornithologists' Society and an honorary member of the Schwäbischer Heimatbund.

In 1918, Bacmeister wrote Goethe's Relations With Ornithology.

In addition, Bacmeister conducted historical and genealogical research into the Bacmeister family and active was for many years on the board of the family association.

A subspecies of the Lesser Spotted Woodpecker is named in his honour. In recognition of his many achievements, Bacmeister was awarded the Federal Cross of Merit first class.

Walther Bacmeister was married to Anna Kauzmann (1875–1951). They had two daughters, and a son, Arnold Bacmeister (1907–1994), who from 1938 to 1945 was a senior civil head of the Film Review Office in the Reichs Ministry of Public Enlightenment and Propaganda in Berlin, and therefore was taken prisoner by the Soviets. He was held at NKVD Special Camp 2 Buchenwald until 1950 and then sentenced to 18 years in prison by a show trial in an East German court. He was released early, in 1955, and reunited with his father in Stuttgart.

Walther Bacmeister died on 14 June 1966, in Stuttgart.
