= William Lewin =

William Lewin (1747–1795) was an English naturalist and illustrator.

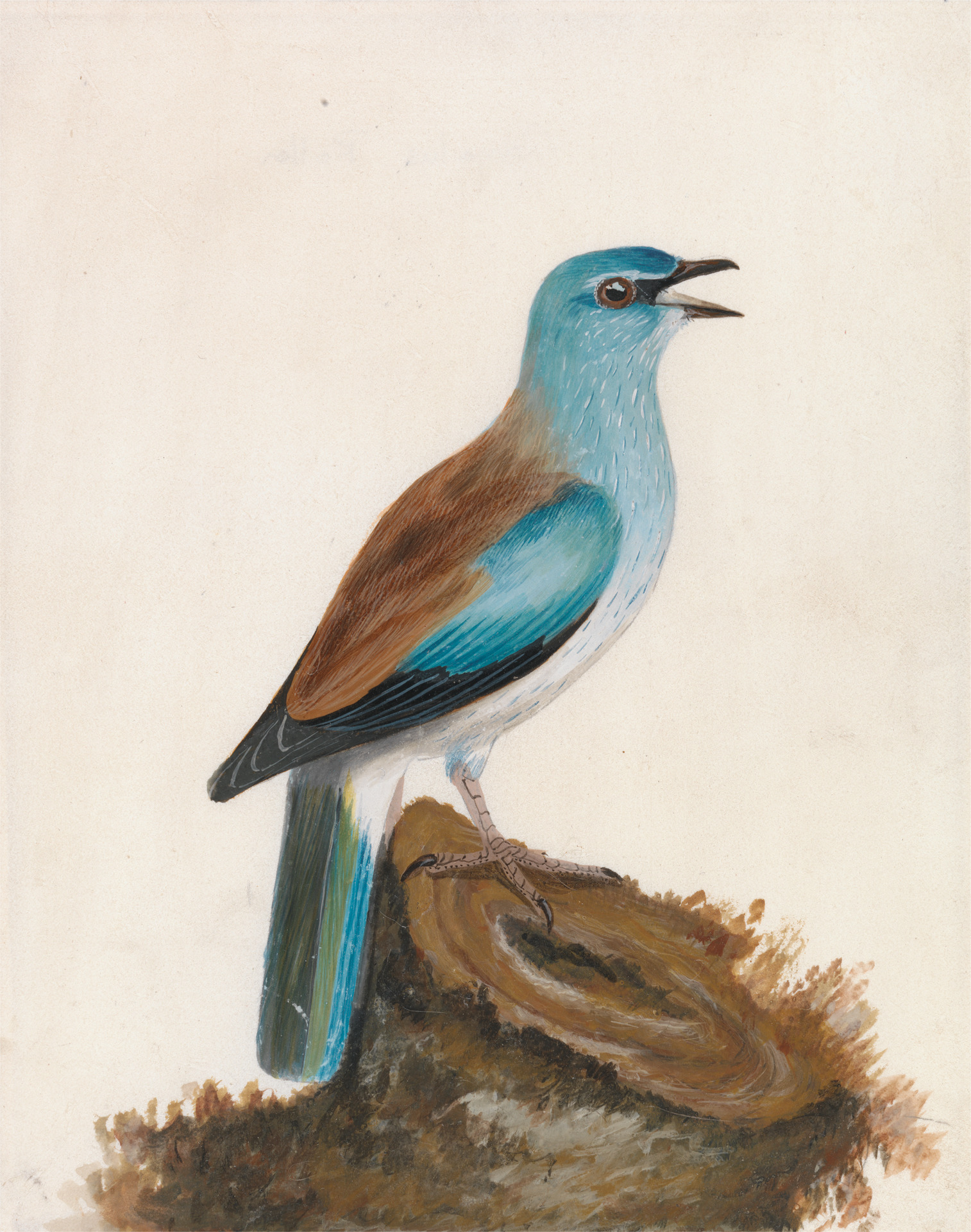
Roller: Garrulous Roller by William Lewin, before 1790. Yale Center for British Art

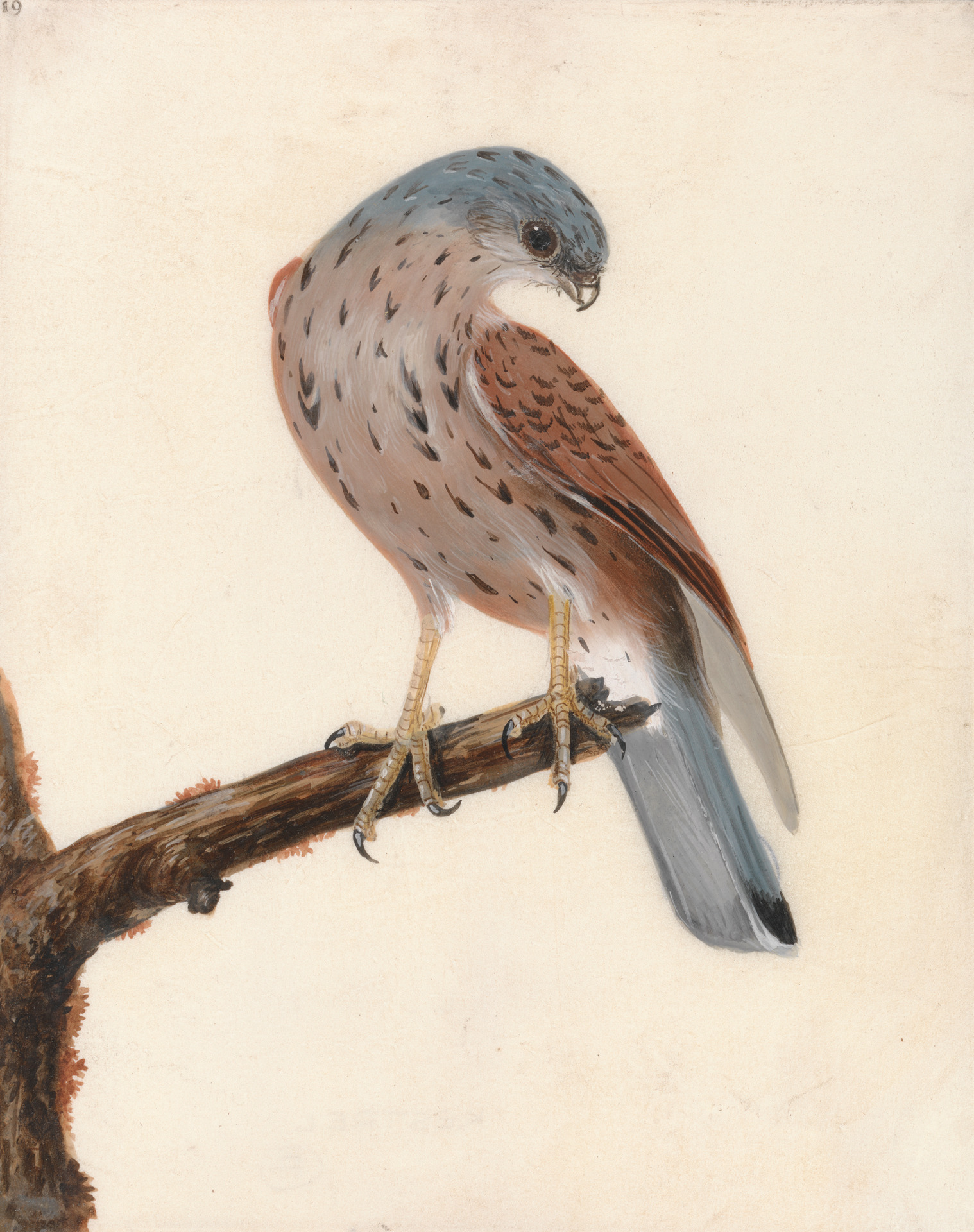
Falcon: Hen Kestrel by William Lewin, before 1790. Yale Center for British Art

Lewin grew up in Stepney, the son of a rate mariner. In 1776 he was earning a living as a pattern drawer, and by 1783 was describing himself as a painter. He specialised in natural history subjects.

In 1789 he began to issue his The Birds of Great Britain, with Their Eggs, Accurately Figured, which he had been working on for the previous twenty years. It included 323 watercolour sketches of each of the 271 of birds and 52 plates of eggs, all which he hand-painted himself for the 60 copy first edition, a total of 19,380 individual paintings. Assisted by his three sons, he immediately began work on a second edition which was issued in parts from 1793 to 1801. The Second Edition, of 150 copies, was produced using copper plates onto which Lewin directly scribed the images which were not copies of the First Edition work, but entirely new and very much more detailed. Lewin died suddenly in 1795 having completed only the first 103 copper-plates himself. His sons (Thomas, Thomas William and John William) completed the remaining plates (104-336) after Lewin's death.

In 1791 his friend John Latham sponsored Lewin's membership of the Linnean Society.

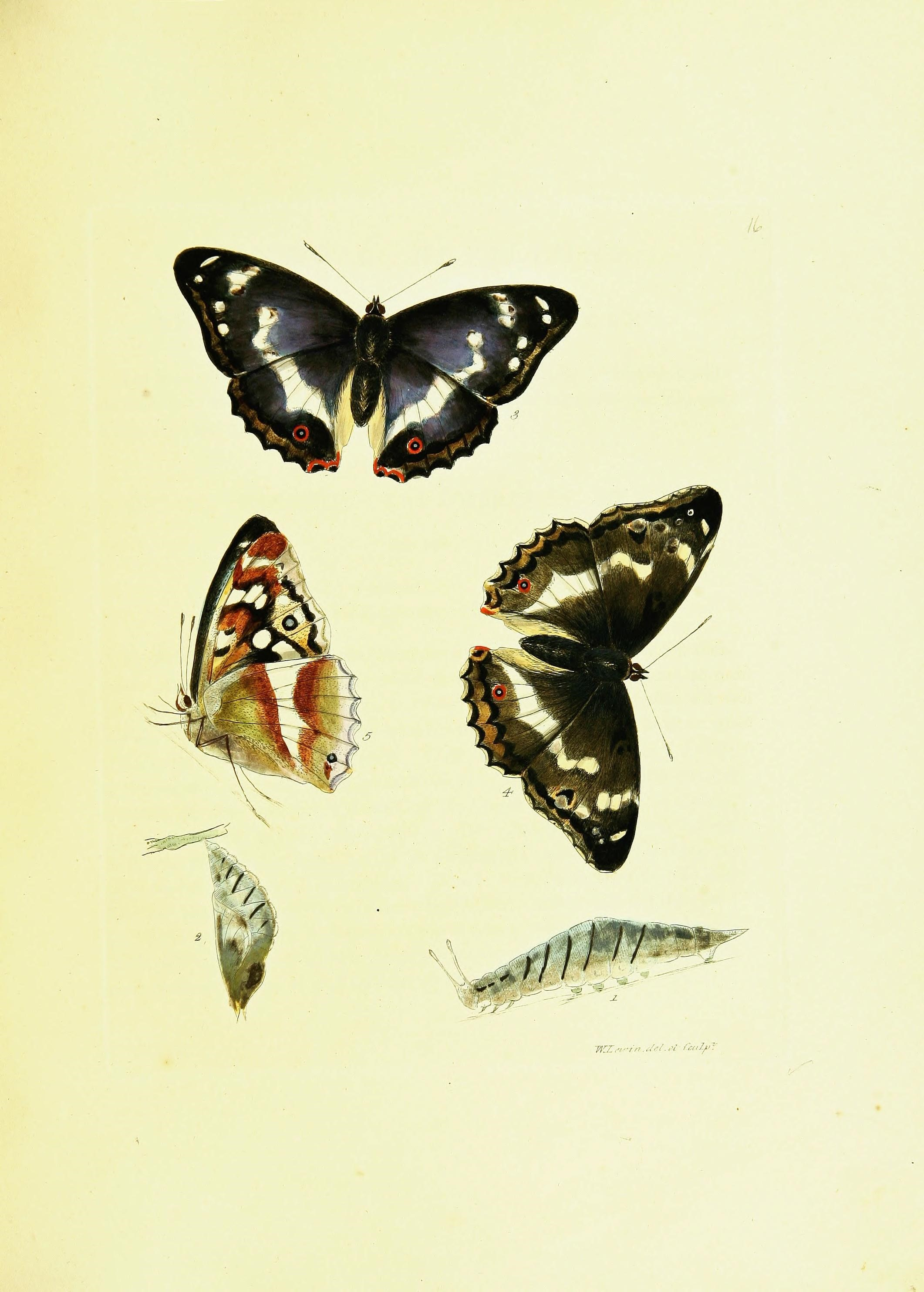
Plate from "The Papilios of Great Britain" (1795)

Lewin also produced a volume on butterflies, "The papilios of Great Britain, systematically arranged, accurately engraved, and painted from nature, with the natural history of each species, from a close application to the subject, and observations made in different countries of this kingdom; as well as from breeding numbers from the egg, or caterpillar, during the last thirty years", in 1795.

Lewin was buried at Edmonton on 10 December 1795.

The First Edition of Birds of Great Britain and their Eggs almost immediately suffered from being broken-up for the individual watercolors, most of which have, as a consequence, been lost or destroyed. The Second Edition has also suffered in this way and complete copies are now also extremely rare with less than 30 known complete examples remaining.

== See also ==
- John Lewin
