= Don Stap =

American author (born 1949)

Don Stap (born 1949) is an American author who writes poetry and nonfiction prose.

Stap grew up in the farm country of southwestern Michigan. Surrounded by hundreds of acres of fields, woods, lakes, and marshes, he developed an interest in the natural world, which is the subject of much of his writing. His mother passed on to him an interest in birds in particular. Stap has a sister and a brother, and a son, Benjamin. Don Stap Website

He graduated from Gull Lake High School in 1967 and attended Western Michigan University in Kalamazoo, receiving his B.A. in English in 1972. In 1978, he received a Ph.D. from the University of Utah. He worked for several years as a freelance writer, but from 1985 to 2019 he taught at the University of Central Florida. He is now professor emeritus.

Stap has published a collection of poems, Letter at the End of Winter (1987), and two nonfiction works related to natural history, A Parrot Without a Name (Knopf, 1990) and Birdsong (Scribner, 2005).

A Parrot Without a Name focuses on the ornithological exploration of South America and the fieldwork of John O’Neill, who has discovered more than a dozen new species of birds in the neotropics, and the legendary Ted Parker (Theodore A. Parker III), who could identify more than 4,000 species of birds by their songs alone. Stap spent time in Peru with both scientists, including a three-month expedition led by O’Neill into an unexplored region near the Peru – Brazil border. A Parrot Without a Name was widely reviewed, including the front-page review of the New York Review of Books by George Plimpton who called the book a "richly detailed account ... [that] captures the excitement as well as the vicissitudes of the quest" to discover new species.

For Birdsong, Stap accompanied Donald Kroodsma, one of the world experts on birdsong, on trips from Martha's Vineyard to the tropical forests of Costa Rica and Nicaragua. Kroodsma's enduring fascination with the simple question of why birds sing and what their songs mean led to a discovery that sheds light on the mystery of mysteries: why young birds in the suborder oscines—the "true songbirds"—learn their songs but the closely related suboscines are born with their songs genetically encoded. Publishers Weekly called Birdsong "a lucidly written combination of scientific lore and vivid reportage". Stap and Kroodsma were interviewed on National Public Radio by Terry Gross for her program Fresh Air.

Stap's poetry has appeared in TriQuarterly, Poetry, Northwest Review, The Massachusetts Review, The American Scholar, Alaska Quarterly Review, Prairie Schooner, and elsewhere.

His prose appears frequently in Audubon, and he's published as well in Smithsonian, Orion, National Wildlife, Living Bird, The North American Review, and Fourth Genre. His prose has been anthologized in many places including The Best American Science and Nature Writing.

Stap is the recipient of a Creative Writing Fellowship from National Endowment for the Arts and two Individual Artist Fellowships from the Florida Division of Cultural Affairs.

== Books ==
'Birdsong: A Natural History. Scribner, New York, New York. 2005

A Parrot Without a Name: The Search for the Last Unknown Birds on Earth. Alfred A. Knopf. New York, New York. 1990

Letter at the End of Winter. University Presses of Florida. Gainesville, Florida. 1987
