= Dirk Van den Abeele =

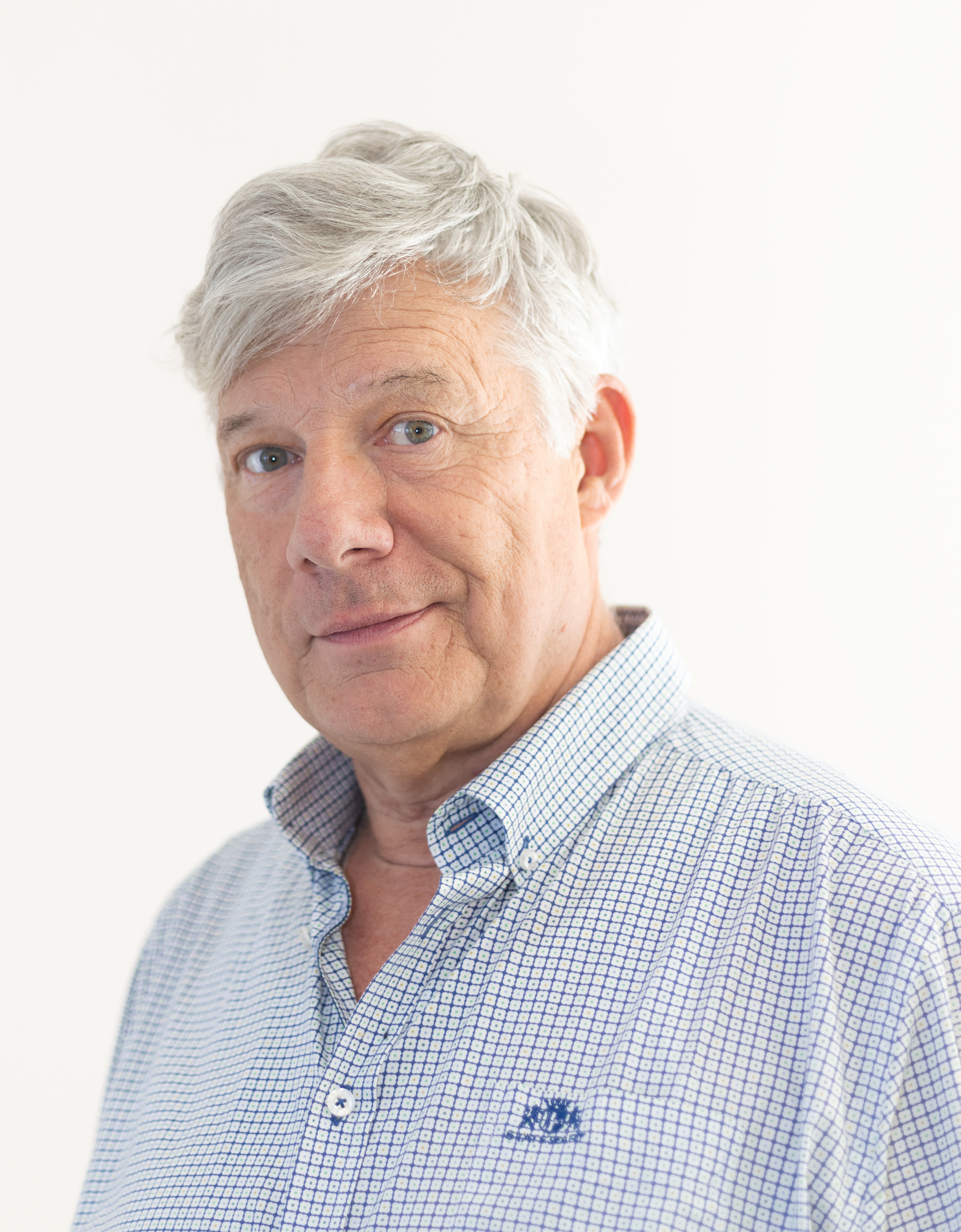
- Born: Dirk Van den Abeele; 23 July 1961; Wetteren, Belgium
- Known for: Lovebirds, Owner’s manual and reference guide (2006); Lovebirds compendium (2016); Agapornis Genome Study (2018); Principles of Avian Genetics for Aviculture (2026)
- Scientific career
- Fields: Ornithology; Genetics

Dirk Van den Abeele (born 23 July 1961) is a Flemish ornithologist, specializing in the genus Agapornis. He has written a number of books on this subject. Most of his books have been translated into English, Greek, Spanish, French, Czech, Italian and German. Since 1999, Van den Abeele is a member of MUTAVI, Research & Advice Group in The Netherlands, where he is conducting research, together with Inte Onsman, into pigmentation of the various colour mutations in birds. Together with the Australian veterinarian Terry Martin he collaborated on the 'International Agreements for Naming Colour Mutations in Psittaciformes'. He was chairman of BVA International, the Belgian Lovebird Society from 1999 till December 2010. Since 2011 he is honorary chairman of BVA-International.

== Ornitho-Genetics VZW ==
In 2005 he founded Ornitho-Genetics VZW in Belgium. Ornitho-Genetics VZW is an independent non-profit organization which focuses mainly on genetics, evolution, taxonomy and the study and conservation of birds in their natural habitat. To support this research the organization cooperates globally with experts, scientists and museums. The results are published in books, on the internet and in ornithology and scientific journals.

== Fieldwork ==
In 2009 he studied Agapornis roseicollis in Namibia and in 2010 and 2013 he volunteered for the Lovebird Research Project, a study into Agapornis lilianae in Liwonde National Park in Malawi. This research project was set up by Tiwonge Mzumara and Mike Perrin from the University of KwaZulu-Natal in South Africa

== Agapornis genome study ==
In 2015, Van den Abeele became a supervisor for a doctoral study on the genome of the genus Agapornis at the University of Potchefstroom, South Africa.They were the first to map the complete genome of Agapornis roseicollis. Since 2021, he works, together with H. van der Zwan from the University of Potchefstroom, South Africa and S. Yung Wa Sin from the School of Biological Sciences at the University of Hong Kong, on a DNA study of color mutations within the genus Agapornis.

== Books ==
- Lovebirds (2001)
- Kweken met agaporniden (2001)
- De roseicollis en zijn mutaties (2002)
- Agaporniden, handboek en naslagwerk (2005)
- Love birds, Owner’s manual and reference guide (2006)
- Agaporniden, handboek en naslagwerk - New Edition - Part I (2012)
- Agaporniden, handboek en naslagwerk - New Edition - Part II (2013)
- Erfelijkheid bij vogels (2014)
- Lovebirds compendium (2016)
- Antologia del Agapornis (2018)
- Les Inséparables - Genus Agapornis (2018)
- Principles of Avian Genetics for Aviculture (2026) - free eBook online
