= Judy Kellogg Markowsky =

American environmentalist (1945–2011)

- Born: 1945
- Died: August 2011 (aged 65)

Academic background
- Education: Smith College; University of Maryland; University of Maine

Judy Kellogg Markowsky (1945–2011) was an American environmentalist, ornithologist, and educator. She was a bird expert, especially of birds in Maine. Markowsky received awards in recognition of her work.

== Personal life ==
Markowsky was born in 1945. Her childhood was spent in Bangor, Maine, and she also lived in Orono, Maine. She earned a Bachelor of Arts degree from Smith College in Massachusetts, a Master of Library Science degree from the University of Maryland, and a doctorate from the University of Maine. She later moved to Hampden, Maine.

== Career ==
Beginning in 1987, Markowsky was a part of the Maine Audubon Society. From 1992 until its debut in 1997, she developed the Fields Pond Audubon Center, of which she was also its founding director until 2008. She taught University of Maine students the concepts of ecology and field ornithology. Markowsky was known for her knowledge of birds in Maine. Markowsky worked on the conservation and restoration of significant natural features within the Penobscot Valley, and she also held a campaign to stop the Penjajawoc Marsh from being developed on. She worked to protect the Penobscot River by holding meetings and other events. She studied birds and other animals in every continent except Antarctica. Markowsky co-wrote the books Everybody's Somebody's Lunch and Shelterwood: Discovering the Forest.

=== Awards ===
The National Women's History Alliance honored Markowsky in 2009 "as one of 100 women who showed exceptional vision and leadership in environmental protection." She posthumously received the Natural Resources Council of Maine Environmental Award for Lifetime Achievement. Former United States senator George J. Mitchell praised Markowsky at the event for her "hard work and dedication to making the world a better place."

== Death ==
Markowsky went missing in 2011 when she left her retirement home. Less than a week later on August 3, 2011, her body was found in the Penobscot by a boater. She died at 65 years old. At Markowsky's memorial service, a group of 400 friends and family made bird calls in memory of her love of birds.
