= Lawrence H. Walkinshaw =

American ornithologist

Lawrence Harvey Walkinshaw (1904–1993) was an American ornithologist and an expert on cranes, about which he published at least three books: Kirtland's Warbler (1983), The Sandhill Cranes (1949) and Cranes of the World (1973). He was the president of the Wilson Ornithological Society from 1958 to 1960. He was also an avid genealogist and published two family histories: Genealogy of the Ezra Grinnell Family (1978) and The Walkinshaws (1986).

Walkinshaw was by profession a dentist, having graduated from the University of Michigan School of Dentistry in 1929.
