= Walter Banzhaf =

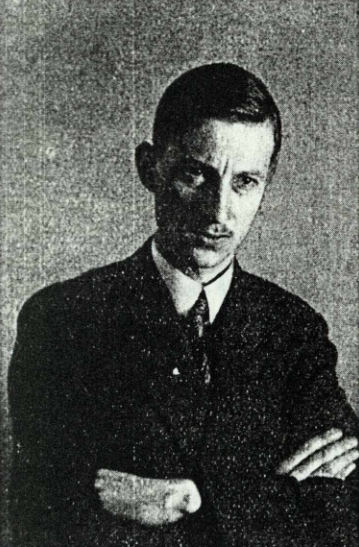

Walter Banzhaf (15 December 1901 – 11 August 1941) was a German zoologist and ornithologist. He worked as a zoologist in the Stettin museum and later as director of a bird observatory and was killed in World War II on the Eastern Front.

== Life and work ==
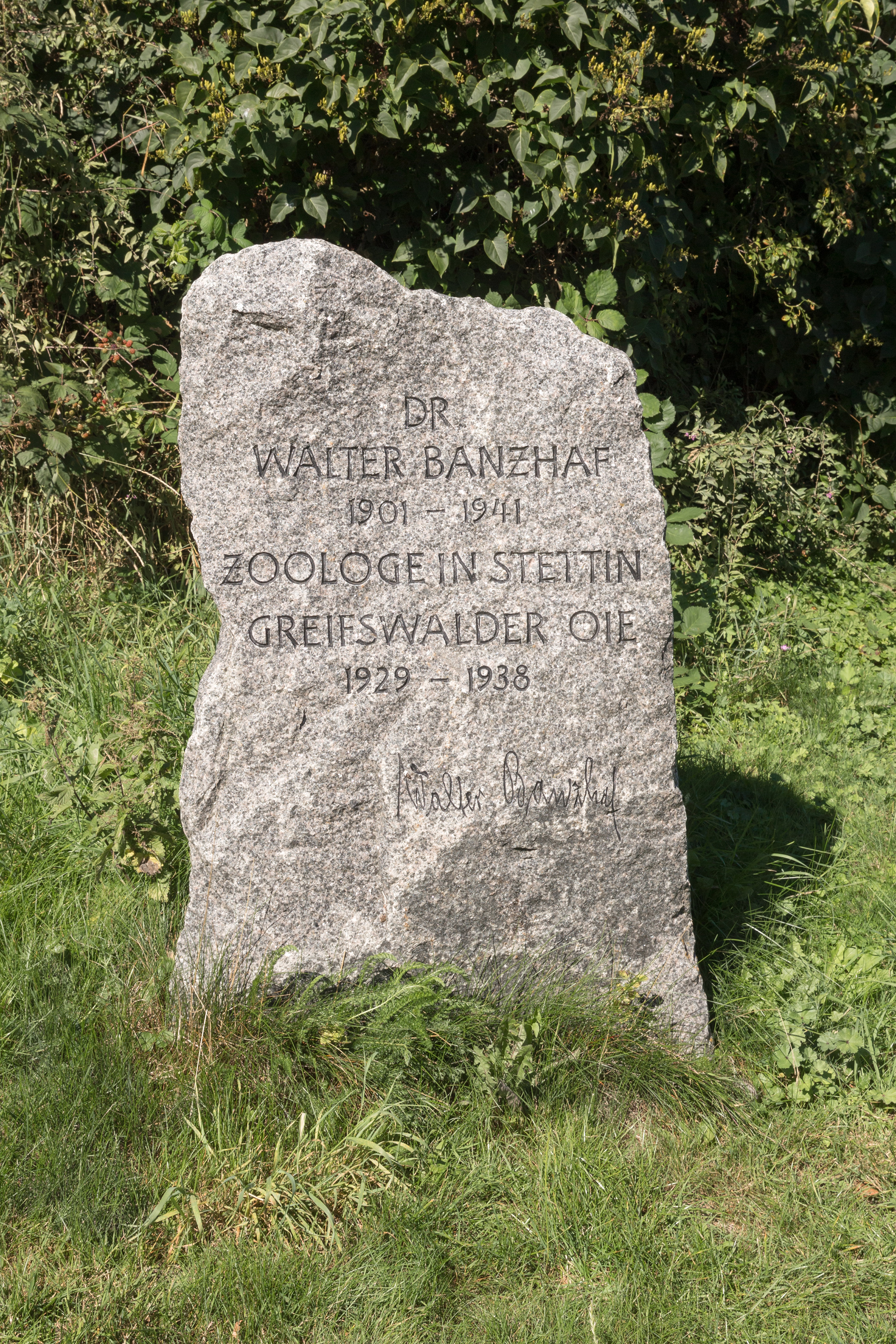
Memorial at Greifswald

Banzhaf was born in Griesheim in a family of Swabian origin. He grew up in Fechenheim going to school in Frankfurt am Main. He became interested in birds as a boy with encouragement from his father as well as his biology teacher Rudolf Richter. He studied birds, working particularly at the ringing stations in Heligoland and Rossiten. He received a doctorate from the Johann Wolfgang Goethe University with a thesis on the anatomy of Opisthocomus cristatus in 1928. He joined the natural history museum in Stettin and worked on the bird collections. He also travelled and wrote extensively on the birds of Greifswald in Vogelzug and Dohrniana. In April 1938 he moved to Frankfurt am Main to serve as director of a newly created bird observatory. In the same year he joined the army with the infantry regiment 81 and was sent to the eastern front where he was killed fighting the Soviet army.
