= Karel Kněžourek =

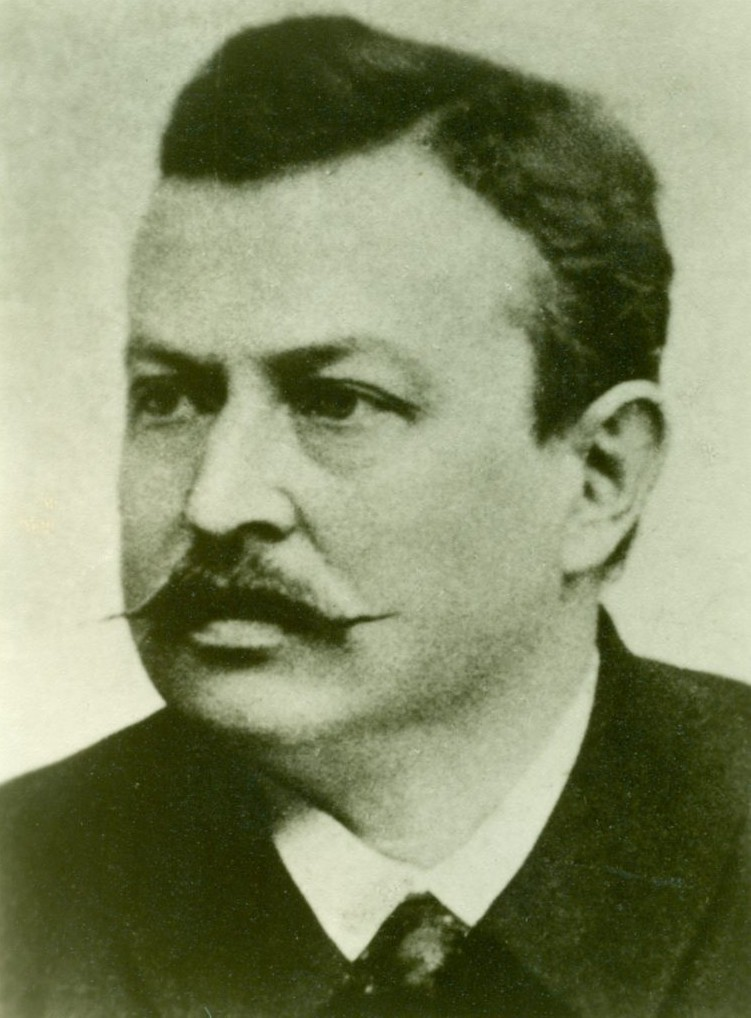

Karel Kněžourek (7 November 1857 – 3 November 1920) was a Czech school teacher and naturalist. He wrote a popular and influential two volume work on the birds of his home region in 1910–1912, which has been considered a landmark in Czech ornithology.

== Biography ==
Kněžourek was born in Městec Králové and was educated at a school in Nový Bydžov and then at the Czech teacher's institute from 1874 to 1877. He worked in a school at Městec Králové until 1882 and then moved to Litošice where he worked until 1893. He married Maria daughter of Václav Pontz in 1883. He published on the birds of Bohemia in 1894–1895 in collaboration with Josef Prokop Pražák. He then became a head teacher at Starkoč and in 1909 he moved to Žleby. He wrote popular articles in magazines including Vesmír, Příroda, and Háj dealing with the natural history of plants, insects and birds. He sometimes wrote under pseudonyms. His major work was a two volume natural history of the birds published in 1910 and 1912. He was forced to retire in 1919 after a suffering from a stroke and died in Žleby and was buried in Markovice but the grave is now lost.
