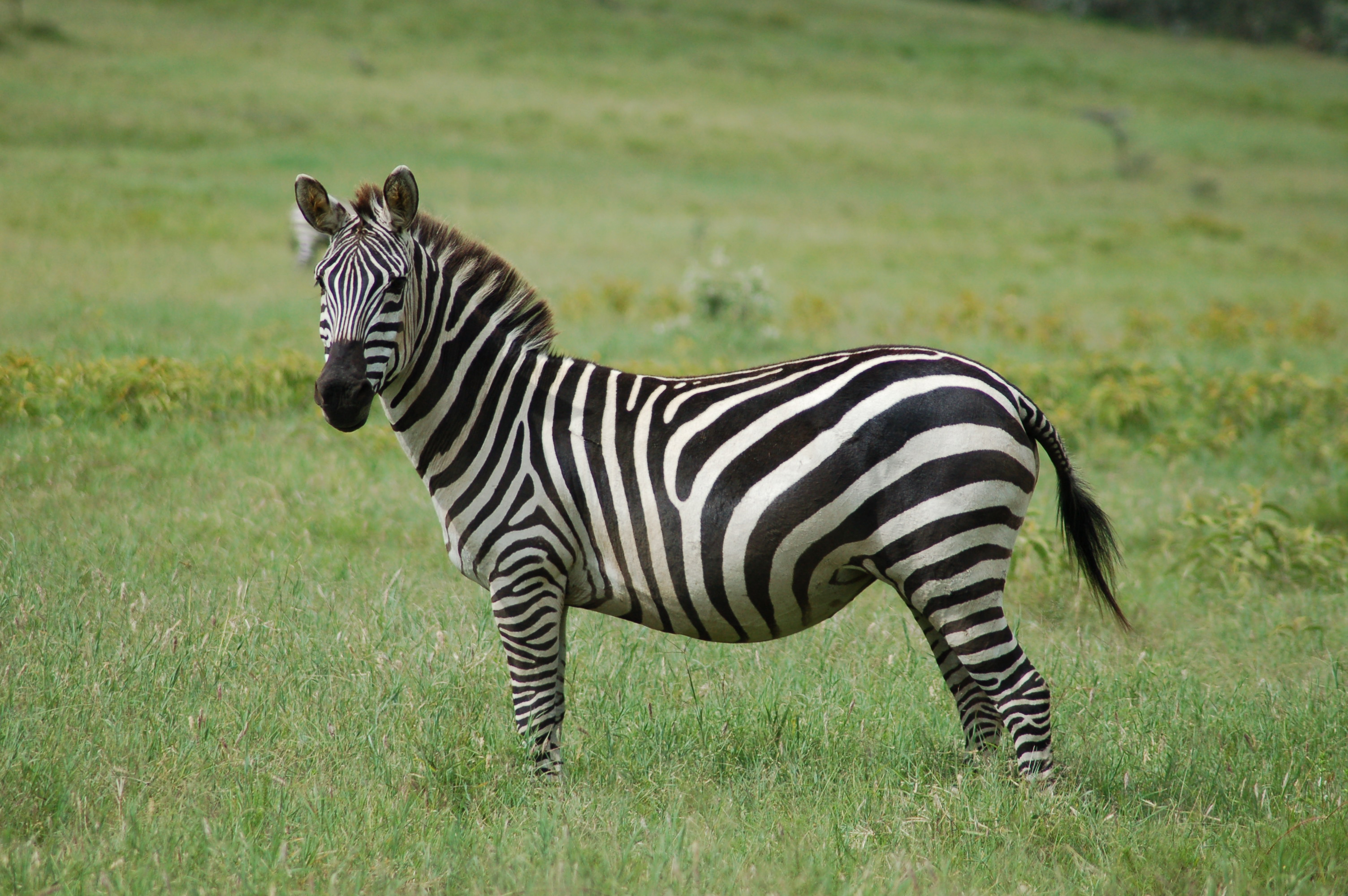
- At the Hell's Gate National Park, Kenya

Scientific classification
- Kingdom: Animalia
- Phylum: Chordata
- Class: Mammalia
- Order: Perissodactyla
- Family: Equidae
- Genus: Equus
- Species: E. quagga
- Subspecies: E. q. boehmi

Trinomial name
- Equus quagga boehmi Matschie, 1892
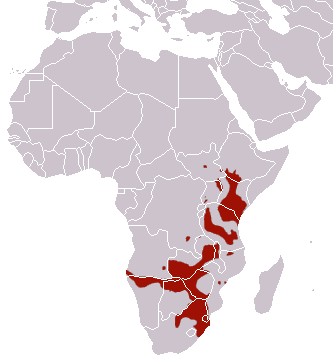

Synonyms
- Equus quagga zambeziensis (Prazak, 1898)

= Grant's zebra =

Subspecies of zebra

Grant's zebra (Equus quagga boehmi) is the smallest of the seven subspecies of the plains zebra. This subspecies represents the zebra form of the Serengeti-Mara ecosystem and others across central Africa.

== Distribution ==
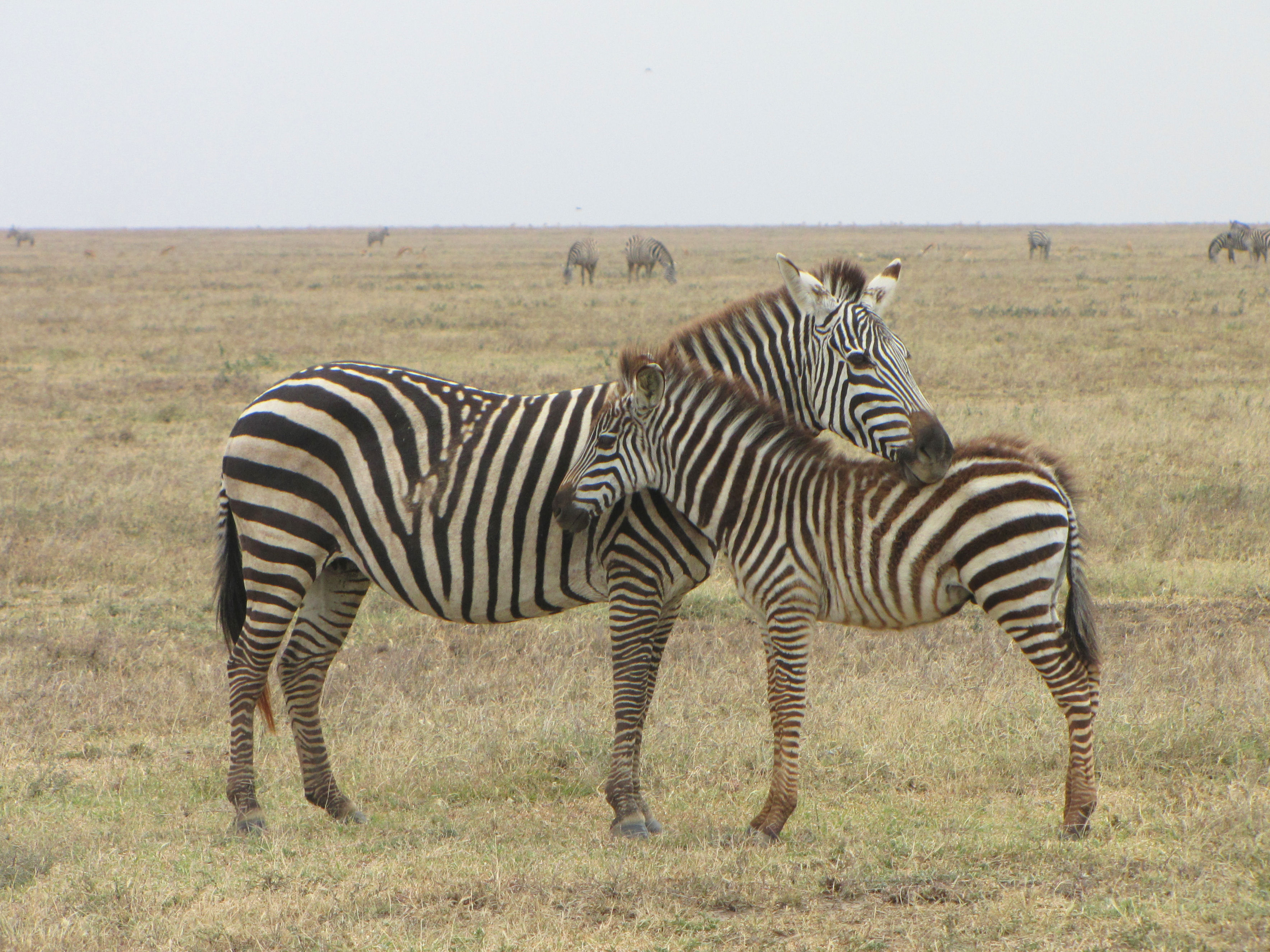
Female with foal, resting, Serengeti, Tanzania

This subspecies is distributed in Zambia west of the Luangwa river west to Kariba, Katanga Province of the Democratic Republic of the Congo, north to the Kibanzao Plateau, and in Tanzania north from Nyangaui and Kibwezi into southwestern Kenya as far as Sotik. It can also be found in eastern Kenya and east of the Great Rift Valley into southernmost Ethiopia. It occurs as far as the Juba River in Somalia.

== Upper Zambezi zebra ==
Duncan (1992) recognized the Upper Zambezi zebra (Equus quagga zambeziensis Prazak, 1898). Groves and Bell (2004) came to the conclusion that the zebras from West Zambia and Malawi cannot be distinguished cranially and that they differ only slightly from other northern plains zebras. The minor size difference does not justify a separate subspecific status for the Upper Zambezi zebra. Therefore, they combine these zebras with Grant's zebra (Equus quagga boehmi).

== Characteristics ==
Grant's zebra at Beijing Wildlife Park, China

This northern subspecies is vertically striped in front, horizontally on the back legs, and diagonally on the rump and hind flanks. Shadow stripes are absent or only poorly expressed. The stripes, as well as the inner spaces, are broad and well defined. Northerly specimens may lack a mane. Grant's zebras grow to be about 182 to 243 cm (6–8 ft) long and 120 to 140 cm (3.9 to 4.6 ft) tall, and generally weigh about 300 kg (660 lb). The zebras live in family groups of up to 18 led by a single stallion. Grant's zebras typically live 20 years.

== Regional extirpations ==
Recent civil wars in the Congo, Rwanda, Somalia, Sudan, Ethiopia, and Uganda have caused dramatic declines in all wildlife populations, including those of Grant's zebra. It is now extirpated from Burundi. Civil war in Angola during much of the past 25 years has devastated its wildlife populations, including its once-abundant plains zebra, and destroyed the national parks administration and infrastructure. Consequently, Grant's zebra is probably extinct or nearly so in Angola, although confirmation will have to wait until future surveys are conducted.

More Grant's zebras are in the wild than any other species or subspecies of zebras. Unlike Grevy and mountain zebras, they are not endangered. Grant's zebras eat the coarse grasses that grow on the African plains, and they are resistant to diseases that often kill cattle, so the zebras do well in the African savannas. However, recent civil wars and political conflicts in the African countries near their habitats has caused regional extinction, and sometimes zebras are killed for their coats, or to eliminate competition with domestic livestock.

== Controversial Burchell's zebra introductions in Grant's zebra historical range ==
From 2001 until 2016 the Kissama Foundation reintroduced wildlife in the Kissama National Park in Angola. The project was dubbed Operation Noah's Ark. Amongst the animals, such as blue wildebeest, waterbuck, Cape giraffe, bush elephants, oryx gemsbok, Livingstone eland, nyala and ostrich, were Burchell's zebras. And from 2017 until 2019 Wildlifevetsnamibia exported wildlife to the Democratic Republic of the Congo's capital city Kinshasa to introduce animals in Parc de la Vallée de la Nsele in partnership with Institut Congolais pour la Conservation de la Nature Amongst the animals were golden oryx gemsbok, impala, blue wildebeest, Kafue lechwe, nyala, blesbok, red hartebeest, southern white rhino, Angolan giraffe, bush elephants and Burchell's zebras. Both introductions are controversial since the park service bodies from both countries did not opt to obtain the native Grant's zebra from for example countries as Zambia, Tanzania or Kenya.

In northwest and northeast Angola the Grant's zebra has been extirpated. But a small population remains in the DRC's Upemba National Park. The DRC thus now has populations of two different subspecies.

== Habitat ==
These animals prefer savanna woodlands and grasslands; they are not found in deserts, wetlands, or rainforests. The mountain variety lives in rocky mountainous areas. The availability of habitat for all species of zebras is shrinking, resulting in population decline.

== Diet ==
Zebras are exclusively herbivorous. Their diet is almost entirely made up of grasses, but they also eat leaves, bark, shrubs, and more.

Like all members of the horse family, zebras spend more time feeding than ruminant herbivores, such as antelope and wildebeest do. This is because horses, including zebras, do not chew their cud. Instead the cellulose in their food is broken down in their caecum. This is not as efficient as the method used by ruminants but is more effective at breaking down coarse vegetation. Hence although zebras must feed for longer each day than antelope and wildebeest do, they can consume grasses and other plants with higher fibre content or lower protein levels than ruminants can digest.

== Behavior ==
Grant's zebras, like many other zebras, are highly social creatures. They can frequently change herd structure, and will change companions every few months.

== Reproduction ==
Female zebras can have one foal per year. Their gestation period is around 360–395 days long, depending on the species. The mother will protect her foal, and it can stand, walk, and run shortly after birth. This is especially important, as foals are vulnerable to predators. Foals will nurse from their mother for up to one year before being weaned.

== Gallery ==
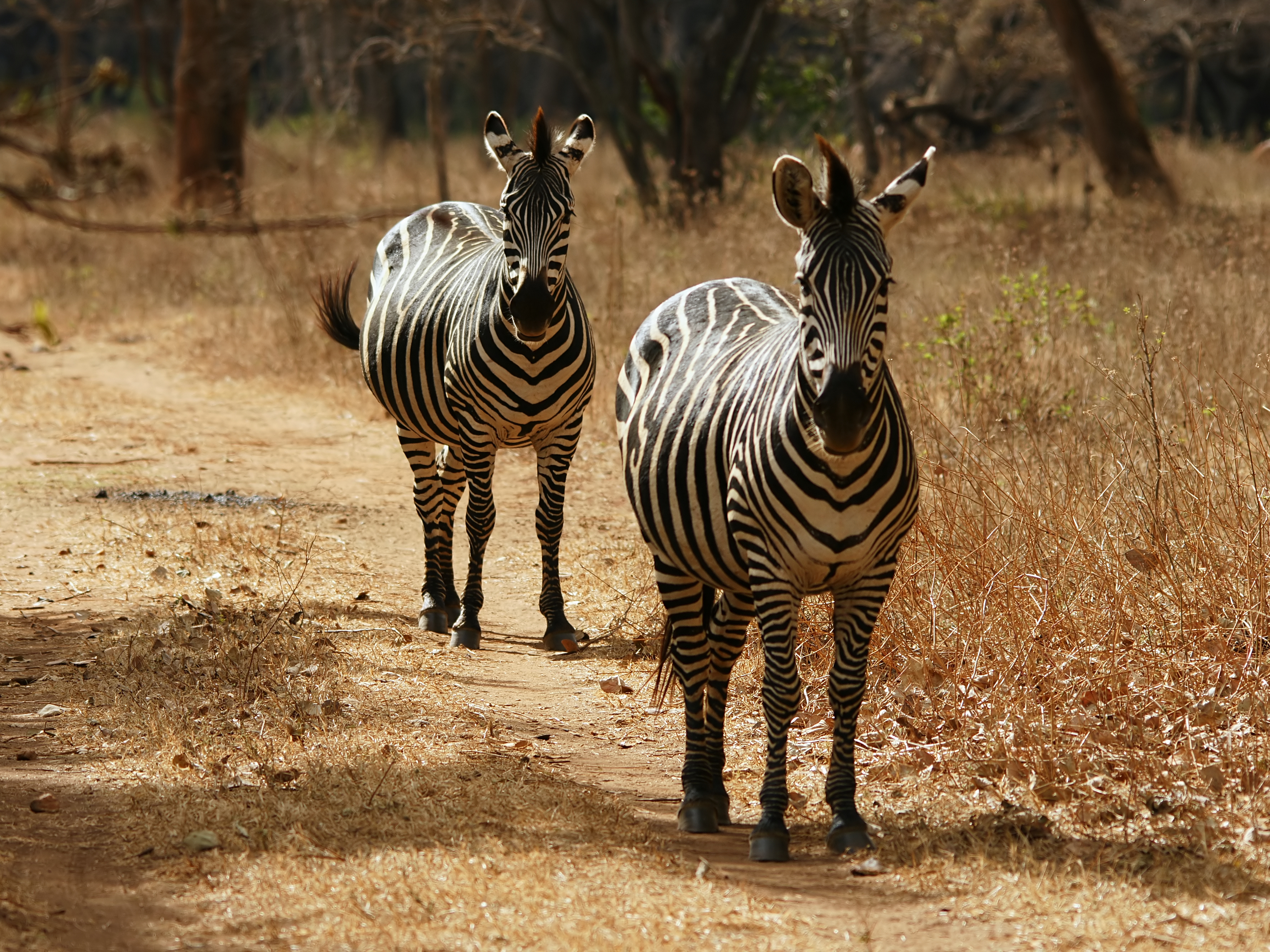
Near Chilanga, Zambia

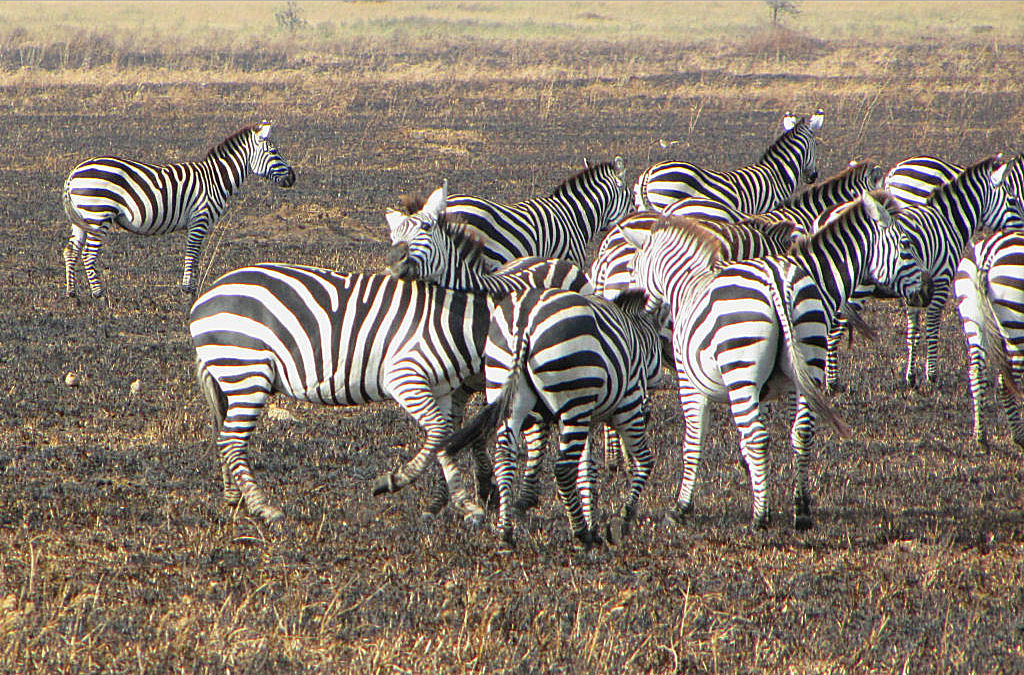
Fighting, Serengeti, Tanzania

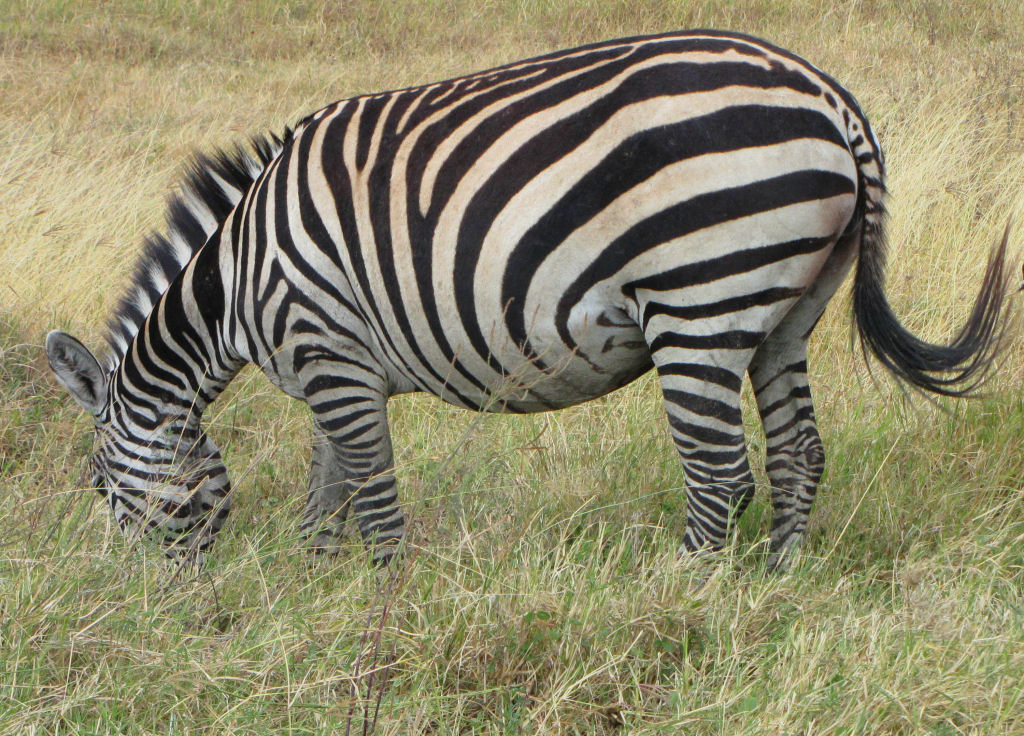
Pregnant, Serengeti

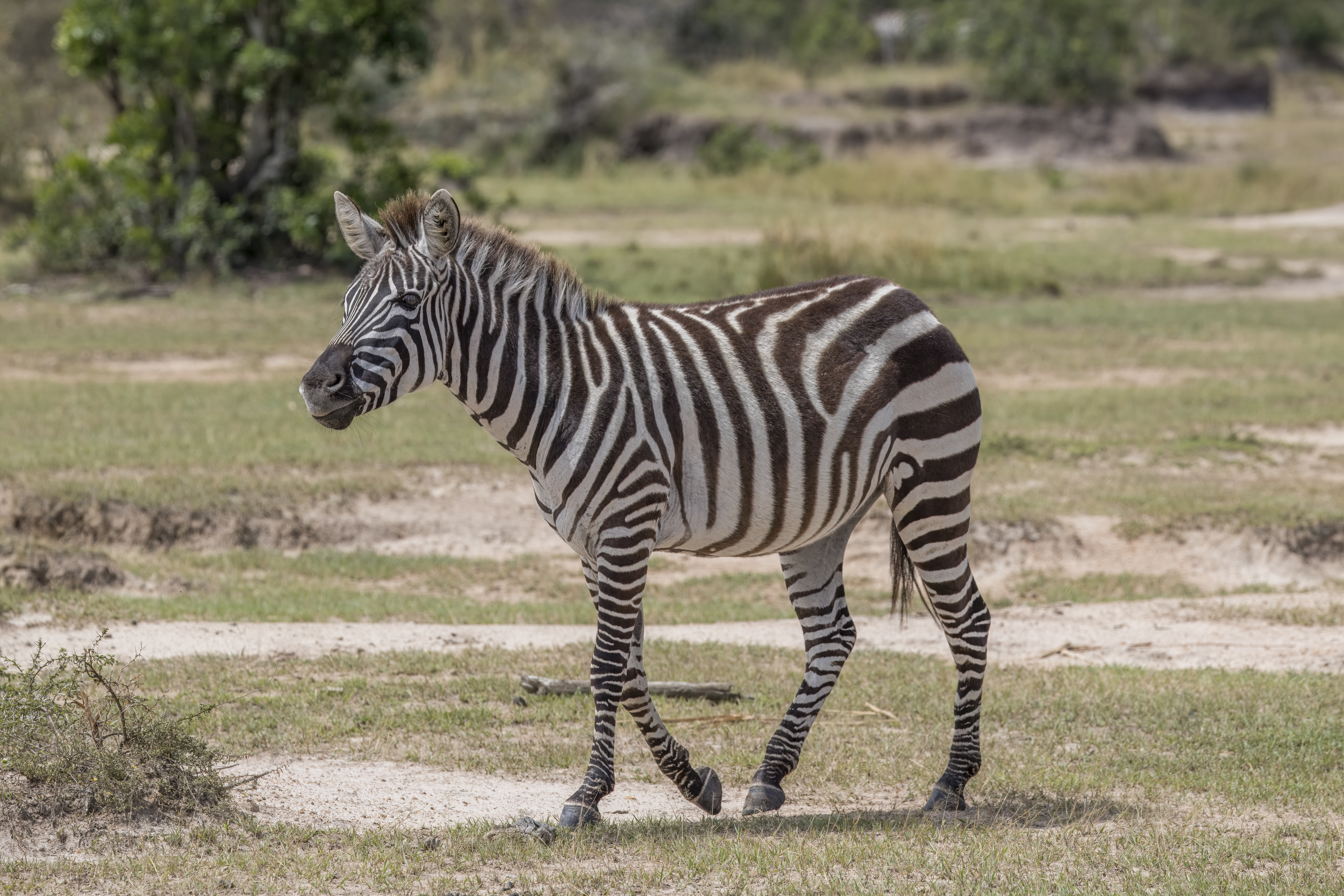
foal, Serengeti

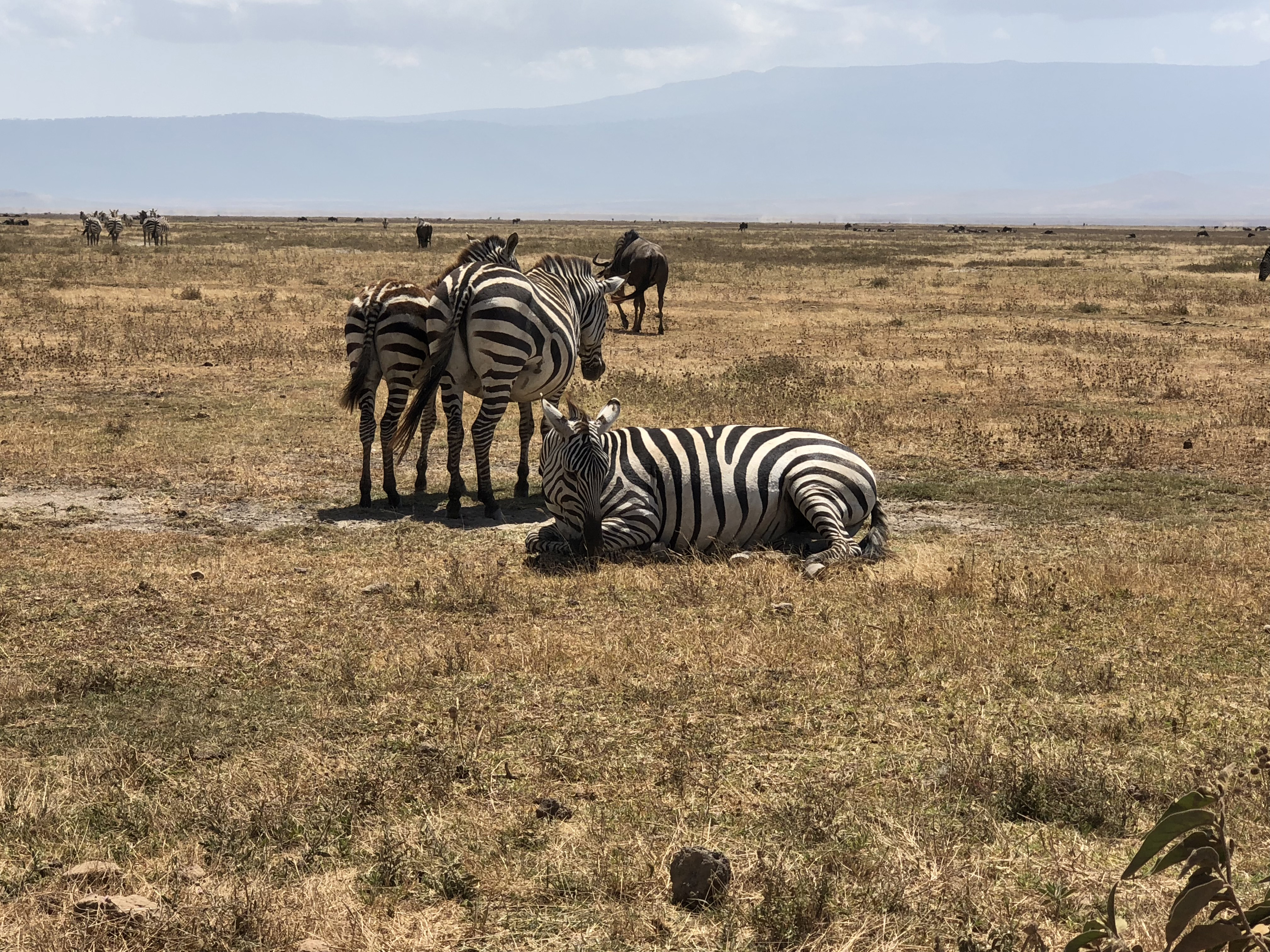
in Ngorongoro Crater during the dry season.

== Sources ==
- Moelman, P. D. 2002. Equids: Zebras, Asses and Horses. Status Survey and Conservation Action Plan. IUCN/SSC Equid Specialist Group.)
