= Otto's Encyclopedia =

Otto's Encyclopedia (Czech: Ottova encyklopedie or Ottův slovník naučný), published at the turn of the 20th century, is the largest encyclopedia written in Czech. For its scope and the quality of the writing, it is comparable to the greatest world encyclopedias of its time, such as Encyclopædia Britannica.

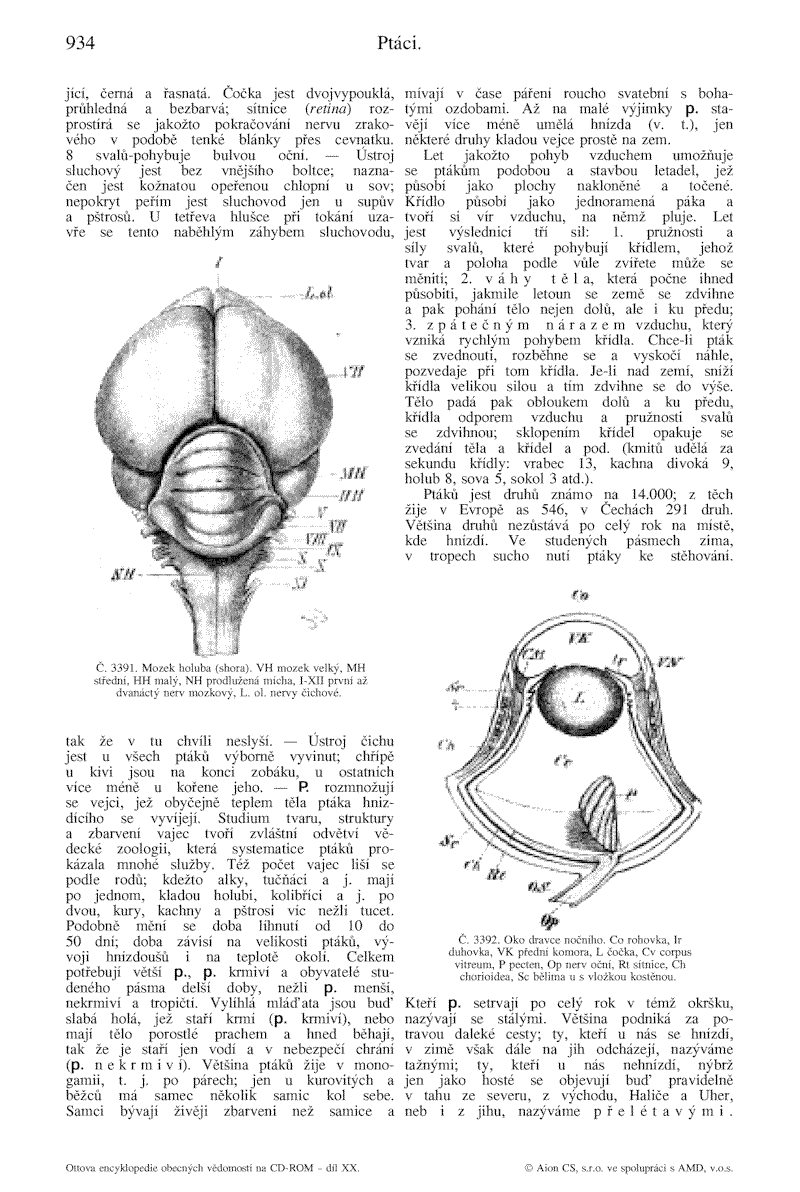
Page number 934 from the 20th volume of Otto's Encyclopedia dealing with birds includes a diagram of the brain of a pigeon (left) and a cross-section of the eye of a night predatory bird (right).

== The first edition ==
At the beginning of the 1880s, Jan Otto, a Czech book-seller and publisher, began planning a new general Czech encyclopedia. He was inspired by the first Czech encyclopedia by F. L. Rieger, a fourteen-volume work published between 1860 and 1874, but wanted to go further. For a long time Otto could not find an eligible editor-in-chief until he began to cooperate with Jan Malý, a former co-editor of the Reiger's encyclopedia, who laid down a concept of the new work with a proposed name - Czech national encyclopedia (Národní encyklopedie česká) in 1884. After Malý's death the following year, Otto found a new editor-in-chief, Tomáš Masaryk later the president of Czechoslovakia, and in 1886 the actual work began (Masaryk himself leading subjects of psychology, sociology, philosophy and logic disciplines, but didn't contribute any text to published encyclopedias). Work on encyclopedia then was slower than Masaryk promised. The next year, Masaryk got involved in a tempestuous dispute over the authenticity of the allegedly historical Zelenohorský and Královedvorský manuscripts and resigned from the editorship. Otto managed to establish a new editorial group from prominent technicians, theologians and representatives of Czech universities including figures such as Karel Boromejský Mádl. Their intensive work and the work of their collaborators lead to the publication of the first volume of the encyclopedia, under the name Ottův slovník naučný (Otto's Encyclopedia), in January 1888. From that point onwards, the work progressed without major problems and volumes were published regularly until the last (28th) one appeared in 1908.

Otto's Encyclopedia consists of 28 (27 regular plus one supplementary) volumes. It contains approximately 150,000 entries printed on 28,912 pages, using an estimated 130 million letters. There are nearly 5,000 images and illustrations and 479 pages of attachments in the encyclopedia. Around 55 main editors and 1,100 external collaborators participated in its creation.

== Otto's Encyclopedia of the New Era ==
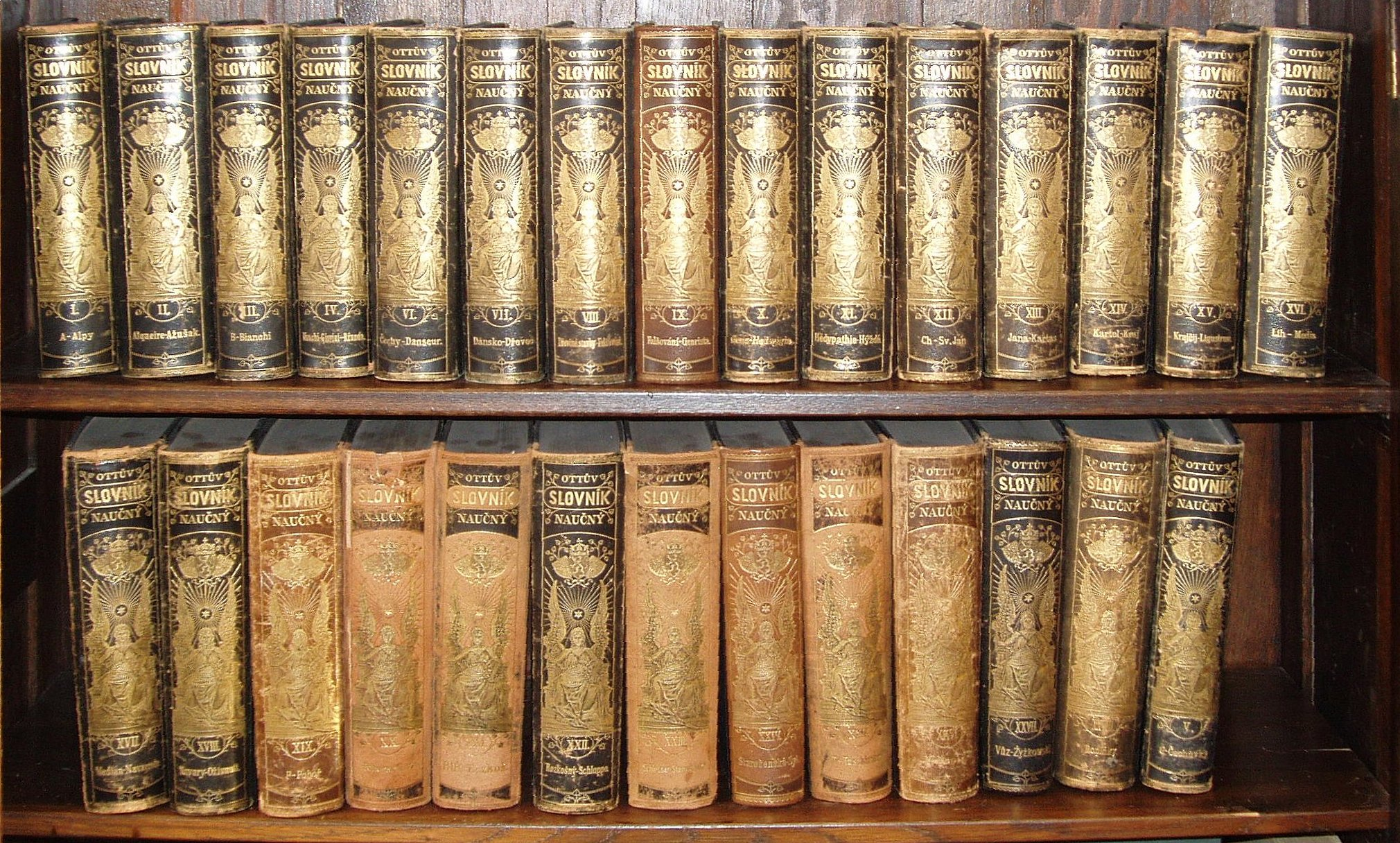
Ottův slovník

Immediately after finishing his encyclopedia, Otto began to plan a second, sixteen-volume revised edition and started to prepare its realization. The preparation was continued by others even after he died (1916) and during the World War I but it was never completed due to quickly rising expenses.

But the story does not end yet. Since the "Jan Otto Ltd." publishing company, which was led by Otto's son-in-law K. B. Mádl, began issuing supplements to the original encyclopedia - the so-called Otto's Encyclopedia of the New Era (Ottův slovník naučný nové doby) - in 1930. These supplements, of very broad conception, were supposed to reflect new pieces of knowledge arising since the first edition was published, new historical events and the new political reality of the freshly born Czechoslovakia. Most of the entries were completely new, only a minor part of them were revised entries from the first encyclopedia. The Jan Otto company continued to release the supplements until 1934, when it got into financial problems and the work was given over to the "Novina" publishing company. Although the supplements were laid out as a set of 16 volumes, the last two of them, although being ready for printing, never came out, as the whole project was stopped in 1943 by the Nazis. In 1945, an order not to publish the rest of the encyclopedia came, substantiated by a statement that volumes released during World War II were severely affected by the Nazi censorship. (This statement has been disputed since. Jan Havránek, a contemporary Czech historian, states that such censorship interference indeed took place, its range was much more limited than was thought at that time.) Thus, the last released entry of the Otto's Encyclopedia of the New Era was "Užok" (Uzsok - a village in Hungary). The text of the two last volumes disappeared and the letters V to Z are missing from the encyclopedia.

Otto's Encyclopedia of the New Era is about one third of the size of the original edition. It contains nearly 60,000 entries in 12 volumes printed on 8,585 pages.

The whole project has been re-released between 1996 and 2003. It has also been digitized and appeared in a CD-ROM version. Both, the paper and digital editions are 'reprints' of the original work, thus preserving the exact look and feel of Otto's Encyclopedia.

Otto's Encyclopedia demonstrated the progress of Czech society and greatly supported its rising national identity. Even today, it is a good source of information, mainly on historical subjects. Derek Sayer in his book says that "But it is Ottův slovník naučný that remains the greatest of Czech works of reference, unsurpassed by anything published since. In its time it was one of the largest encyclopedias in the world, second in the number of its entries and illustrations perhaps only to the Encyclopædia Britannica."
