= Karel Boromejský Mádl =

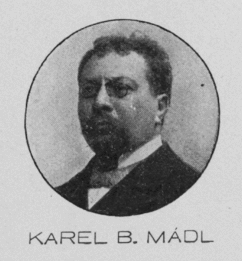
- Born: 15 August 1859; Nový Bydžov
- Died: 20 November 1932 (aged 73); Potštejn

Karel Boromejský Mádl (15 August 1859 – 20 November 1932) was a Czech historian and art critic and a professor at the Academy of Arts, Architecture and Design in Prague. He was one of the leading critics of the 1890s.

== Life ==
Mádl graduated from secondary school in Prague and lived in Vienna from 1880-83, where he attended art history lectures and seminars by Professor R. Eitelberger von Edelberg and M. Thausing at the Museum of Applied Arts, Vienna and Albertina. However, there is no evidence that he was a full-time enrolled student. In Vienna, he probably also met the founders of the Viennese School of Art History, Franz Wickhoff, and the first headmaster of the Academy of Arts, Architecture and Design, Františka Schmoranze.

In 1883 and 1884, Mádl visited Munich and Paris and then from 1884 he stayed in Vienna. From 1886, he collaborated with the newly founded Ruch Gallery and from 1888 he was an associate editor of Otto's encyclopedia. He took numerous trips abroad to study.

Mádl passionately believed in the need for an art school in Prague, and he became an associate professor of textile art and the secretary of the school when it was established in 1886. Mádl then became the successor to Otakar Hostinsky, the lecturer on history of art, and was appointed full professor and administrator of the library.

During World War I, Mádl paused his work for the art school. In 1917, he was appointed vice-chairman of the Modern Art Gallery in Prague and was a member of the commission for the return of Bohemian scholars from abroad. He was also a member of various arts societies.

Mádl died of diabetes on 20 November 1932, at the age of 73.

== Work ==
Mádl's approach to art history marked a move away from the previous generations'. It incorporated formal analysis, archaeology, and emphasised precise determination of a work's author and time and place of origin.

Mádl's influence shaped new artistic commissions, such as the Jan Hus Memorial created by Ladislav Šaloun.

Mádl resented German cultural dominance. He advocated engagement with the 'progressive currents of French art' and 'bemoaned the German appropriation of Prague.'

Mádl was a notable critic and contributor to many magazines and publications. From 1887, he published regularly in Archaeological Monuments. He began publishing an Overview of Art History from Antiquity to the Present, which was unfinished at the time of his death.
