= Nový Bydžov =

- Town
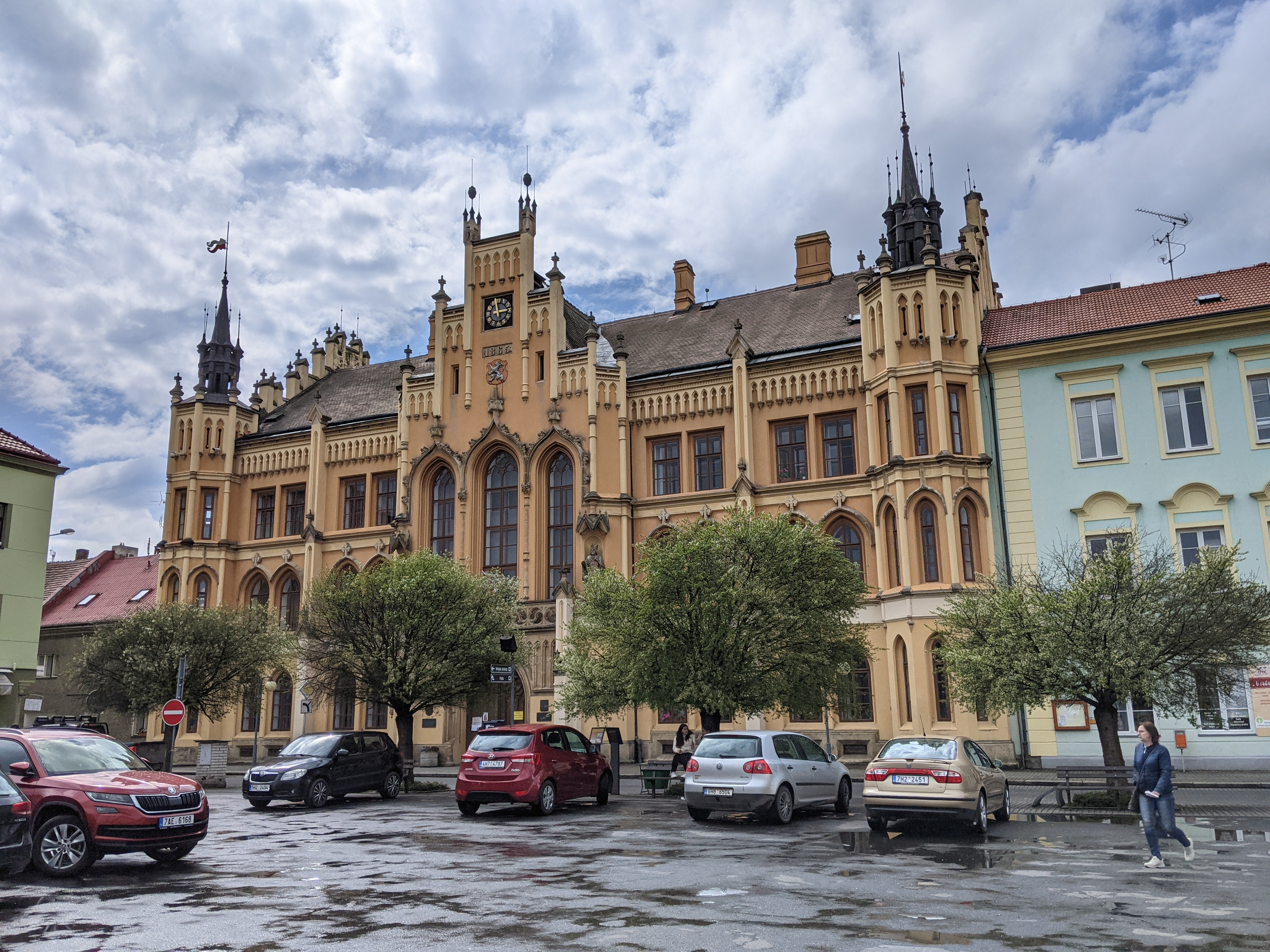
- Town hall

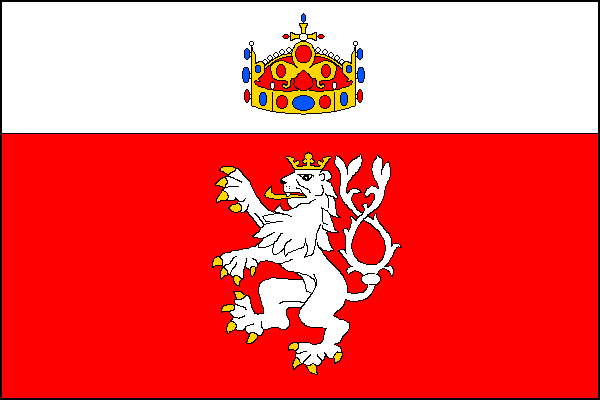
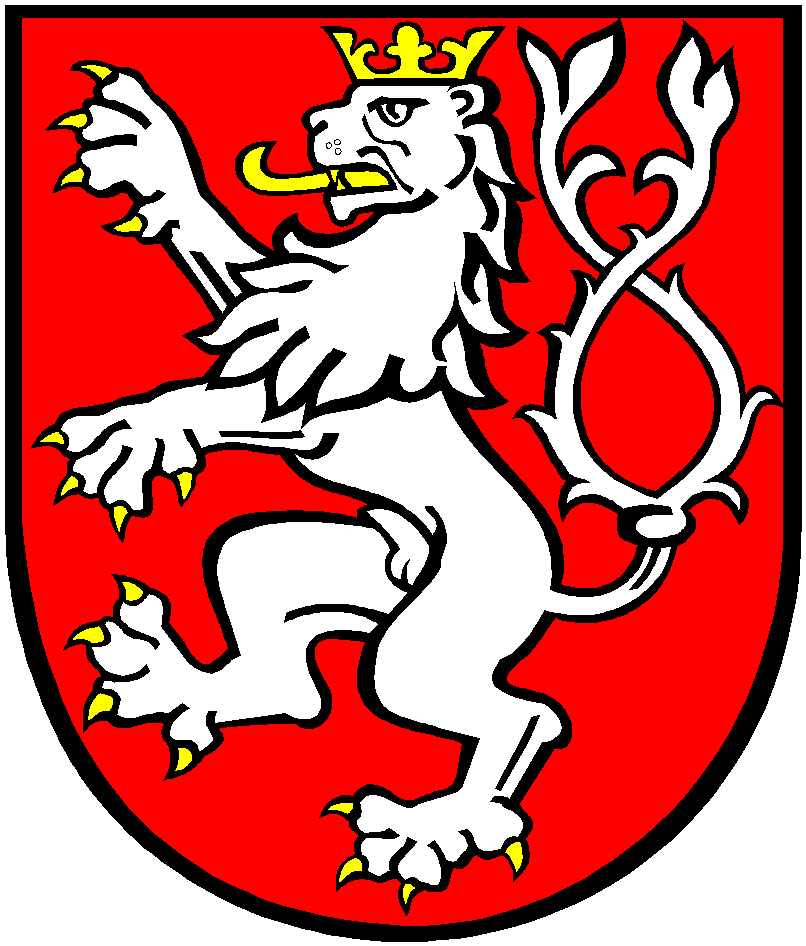
- Flag Coat of arms

- Location in the Czech Republic
- Coordinates: 50°14′25″N 15°29′31″E
- Country: Czech Republic
- Region: Hradec Králové
- District: Hradec Králové
- First mentioned: 1305

Government
  - Mayor: Matěj Novotný (ODS)

Area
  - Total: 35.27 km^{2} (13.62 sq mi)
- Elevation: 234 m (768 ft)

Population (2026-01-01)
  - Total: 7,298
  - Density: 206.9/km^{2} (535.9/sq mi)
- Time zone: UTC+1 (CET)
  - Summer (DST): UTC+2 (CEST)
- Postal code: 504 01
- Website: www.novybydzov.cz

Nový Bydžov (Czech pronunciation: [ˈnoviː ˈbɪdʒof]; German: Neubidschow) is a town in Hradec Králové District in the Hradec Králové Region of the Czech Republic. It has about 7,300 inhabitants. The town is located on the Cidlina River in the East Elbe Table.

Nový Bydžov has been a town since its founding at the beginning of the 14th century. The historic town centre is well preserved and is protected as an urban monument zone and the Vysočany part of Nový Bydžov is protected as a village monument zone. Among the main landmarks of the town are the Church of Saint Lawrence from the early 14th century and the neo-Gothic town hall.

== Administrative division ==
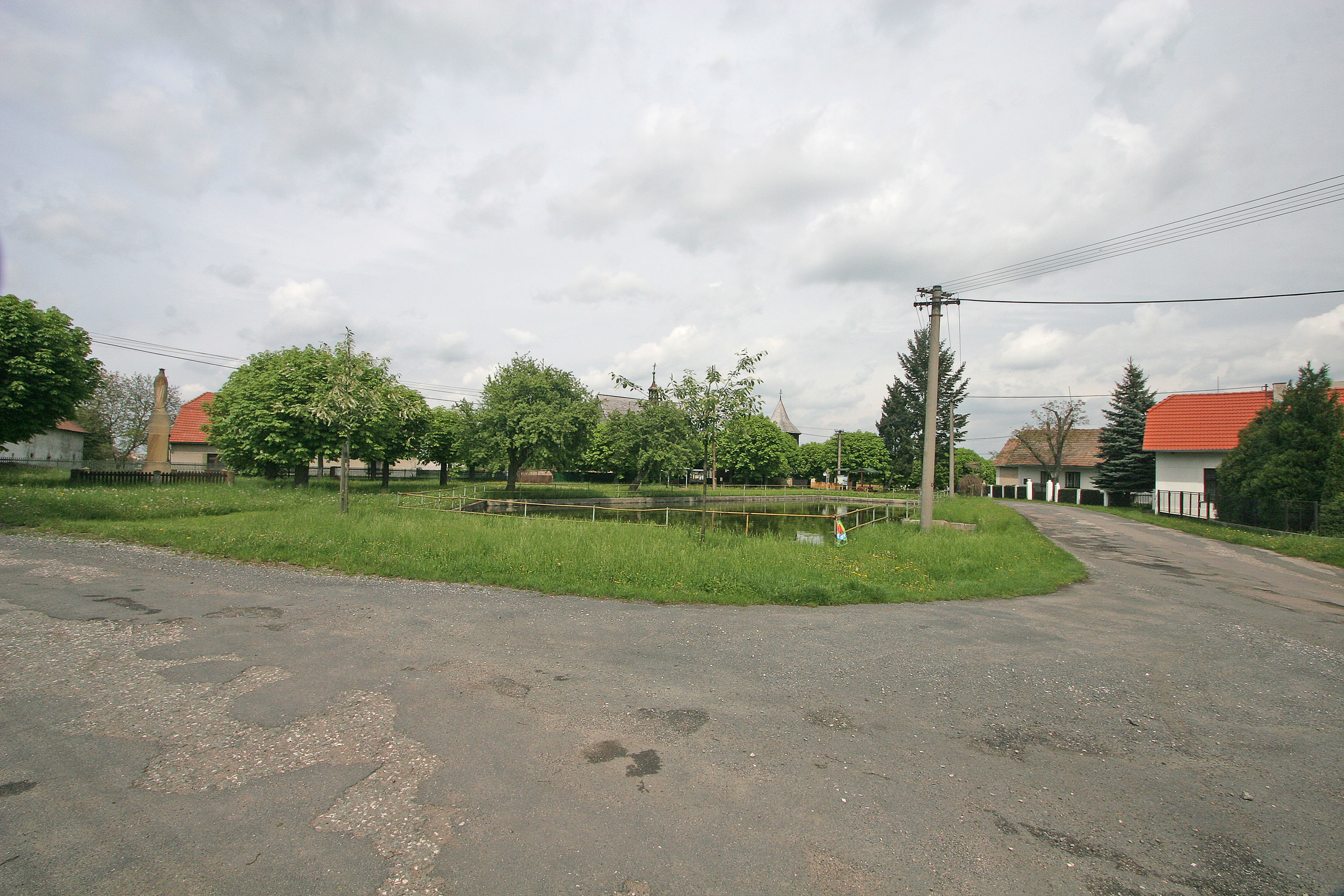
Centre of Vysočany

Nový Bydžov consists of eight municipal parts (in brackets population according to the 2021 census):

- Nový Bydžov (5,581)
- Chudonice (504)
- Nová Skřeněř (62)
- Skochovice (204)
- Stará Skřeněř (129)
- Vysočany (76)
- Zábědov (325)
- Žantov (16)

== Etymology ==
The name Bydžov is derived from the personal name Bydeš, meaning "Bydeš's (court)". The prefix nový ('new') distinguished the town from nearby Starý Bydžov ('old Bydžov'), which was originally called just Bydžov.

== Geography ==
Nový Bydžov is located about 23 kilometres (14 mi) west of Hradec Králové. It lies in a flat agricultural landscape in the East Elbe Table. The highest point is the hill Velký Borek at 267 m (876 ft) above sea level. The town is situated on the Cidlina River.

== History ==
The first written mention of Nový Bydžov is from 1305, when it was a royal town of King Wenceslaus II. In 1325, King John of Bohemia sold it to the Wartemberg family. In 1516 the property passed into the hands of the Pernštejn family, and during their rule the town prospered and gained new privileges. With the permission of the nobility, the Jewish population settled in the town. From 1548, Nový Bydžov was owned by the Waldstein family.

In 1569, Nový Bydžov was exempt by payment from servitude and became the royal dowry town. The development of the town was stopped by the Thirty Years' War.

From 1751 to 1784, it was the royal seat of the newly created Nový Bydžov Region which included the Giant Mountains from Vrchlabí through Jilemnice, Nová Paka, Jičín, Hořice, Nový Bydžov, Chlumec nad Cidlinou and Poděbrady as far as Sadská. In 1784, the seat of the region was transferred to Jičín due to its position, but the name of the region remained the same until 1850. In 1850, it was still the most populous town in the region.

Nový Bydžov was then from 1850 until 1960 the district centre. After districts had been abolished it did not cease to be the natural centre of the region.

== Demographics ==
Historical population

Year	Pop.	±%
1869	7,719	—
1880	8,753	+13.4%
1890	9,401	+7.4%
1900	9,876	+5.1%
1910	10,486	+6.2%

Year	Pop.	±%
1921	9,775	−6.8%
1930	9,295	−4.9%
1950	8,015	−13.8%
1961	8,163	+1.8%
1970	7,656	−6.2%

Year	Pop.	±%
1980	7,545	−1.4%
1991	7,242	−4.0%
2001	7,201	−0.6%
2011	7,178	−0.3%
2021	6,897	−3.9%

Source: Censuses

== Economy ==
The largest employers with headquarters in the town are Datwyler Sealing Technologies CZ (manufacturer of rubber products) and Amcor Flexibles Nový Bydžov (manufacturer of plastic packaging), both with more than 250 employees.

== Transport ==
Nový Bydžov is located on the regional railway line Kolín–Trutnov and on a local railway line heading from Městec Králové to Lomnice nad Popelkou.

== Culture ==
Since the 1840s, the town is known for its annual student celebrations called merenda.

== Sights ==
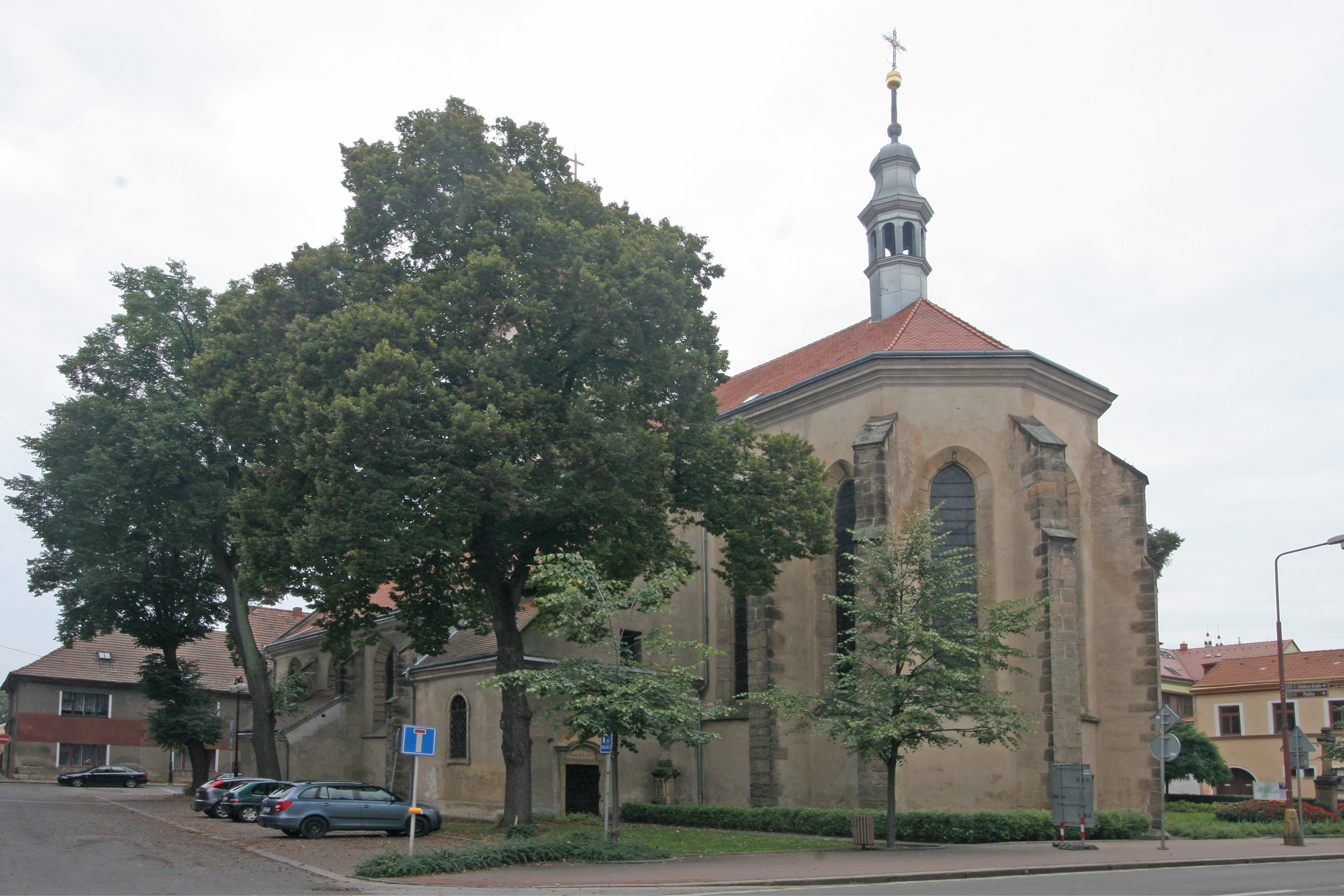
Church of Saint Lawrence

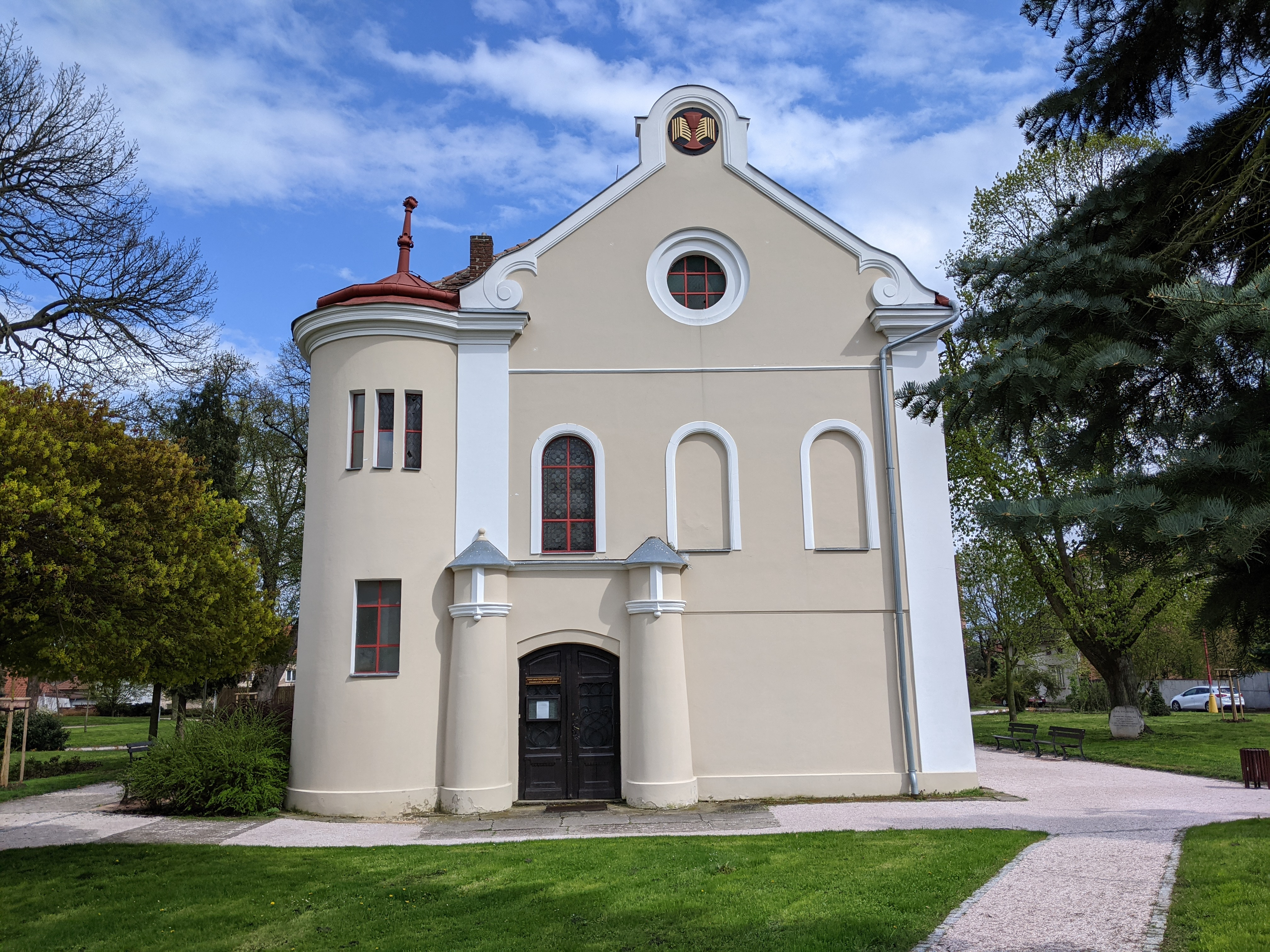
Former synagogue

The historic core has regular medieval floor plan with the square Masarykovo náměstí in the centre. In the middle of the square is a Marian plague column from 1716. The town hall, built in 1862–1865, is one of the most valuable neo-Gothic town halls in the country. The Art Nouveau building of the former savings bank, built in 1905–1907, houses today the Town Museum. The museum contains exhibits on prehistory of the region, rural ethnography, the Bydžov Ark (a winged plate altar), paintings by Petr Brandl, and sculptures of the naïve artist Václav Kudera-Křapík.

The most valuable building is the Church of Saint Lawrence from the early 14th century. It is a unique example of a preserved Gothic church unaffected by reconstructions. In the eastern part of the town is the Church of Saint James the Great, built in the late Baroque style in 1768–1775. Other churches include the Church of the Holy Trinity, the Church of Our Lady of Sorrows, and the Church of Saint Margaret the Virgin in Vysočany with the wooden bell tower.

There are two Jewish cemeteries. The Old Cemetery was founded in 1520 and is the third largest in the Czech Republic. The oldest preserved tomb dates from 1577. The New Synagogue is also preserved and today serves as a chapel of the Moravian Church.

== Notable people ==
- Josef Schnitter (1852–1914), Czech-Bulgarian architect
- Karel Boromejský Mádl (1859–1932), art historian and critic
- Karel Šviha (1877–1937), politician
- Zdeněk Jarkovský (1918–1948), ice hockey player

== Twin towns – sister cities ==
Nový Bydžov is twinned with:

- Brezno, Slovakia
- Cascinette d'Ivrea, Italy
- Nădlac, Romania
