= Josef Prokop Pražák =

Bohemian ornithologist

Josef Prokop Pražák (22 June 1870 – 15 July 1904) was a Bohemian ornithologist. Because of problems in his research including publication of false information and the submission of stolen specimens with fake data, much of his work remains under a cloud of uncertainty.

ed to Edinburgh again, he was declared a Doctor of Natural Sciences there. After this, he engaged in further scientific activity in the natural science institutes of this university and achieved a distinguished name there, and was offered a professorship in the college of Calcutta, India. But military duty prevented him from this mission, as a reserve officer he had to return home and therefore declined the position. He then settled in Prague, where he took the post of prefect at Straka's Noble Academy and taught French and English there. At the same time, however, he continued to study privately and prepared for publication a comprehensive English book on ungulates. In order to have more time for this work, he left his posi

== Life ==
Born in Hořiněves he spent much of his life in Bohemia. He was educated at gymnasiums in Nový Bydžov and Hradec Králové and received a doctorate from the University of Vienna. He received a doctorate in law from Bordeaux. He then became an assistant professor at the University of Edinburgh between 1896 and 1897 and researched the horse family and described the subspecies Equus quagga zambeziensis in a manuscript of 1898 which was cited by Trouessart who also noted the author for the name zambeziensis as Pražák. He was offered a position in a college in Calcutta but military duty prevented him from taking it up. He then settled in Prague and taught French and English at Straka's Academy.

Pražák published numerous works in ornithology but a lot of his work was doubted even during his lifetime. His records of the birds of Galicia included rarities and included a mass of collections that simply could not have been collected in the time period mentioned and it was noted by von Tschusi and Lorenz von Liburnau that there was no way he could have collected in some of the places in which he obtained some specimens and has subsequently come to be recognized as fraudulent. He was requested to respond to the statements made against his observations by Lorenz von Liburnau and he failed to respond. He described at least two fake species of bird including Vanellus grisescens which he claimed was collected by Richard Materna in northern Chile and Trochalopteron hennickei supposedly collected by Jaworowski from the Hunan Province of China. He also contributed a paper on bird migration with arrival dates for species in eastern Bohemia. He published on the birds of Bohemia with Karel Kněžourek. His data covered more than a hundred years and this was submitted to the Hungarian journal Aquila but was suspected to be fraudulent and not published. Like Richard Meinertzhagen he too stole specimens from museums and resubmitted them with altered labels. Ernst Bauernfeind, a curator at the Natural History Museum at Vienna (Naturhistorisches Museum Wien, NHMW) found that a Bohemian specimen of Prunella montanella (NHMW 11423) that Pražák submitted matched details to a specimen collected by Dybowski at Kultuk, Lake Baikal, which had gone missing. Otto Kleinschmidt, who had corresponded with and had noted various inaccuracies in information provided by Pražák, concluded in his obituary that the latter suffered from kleptomania and that he was possibly mentally ill. Pražák returned from Edinburgh, got married and taught in private schools for a while and briefly took part in political agitations. He died of tuberculosis and few ornithological journals covered his death.
