= Starkoč =

- Municipality
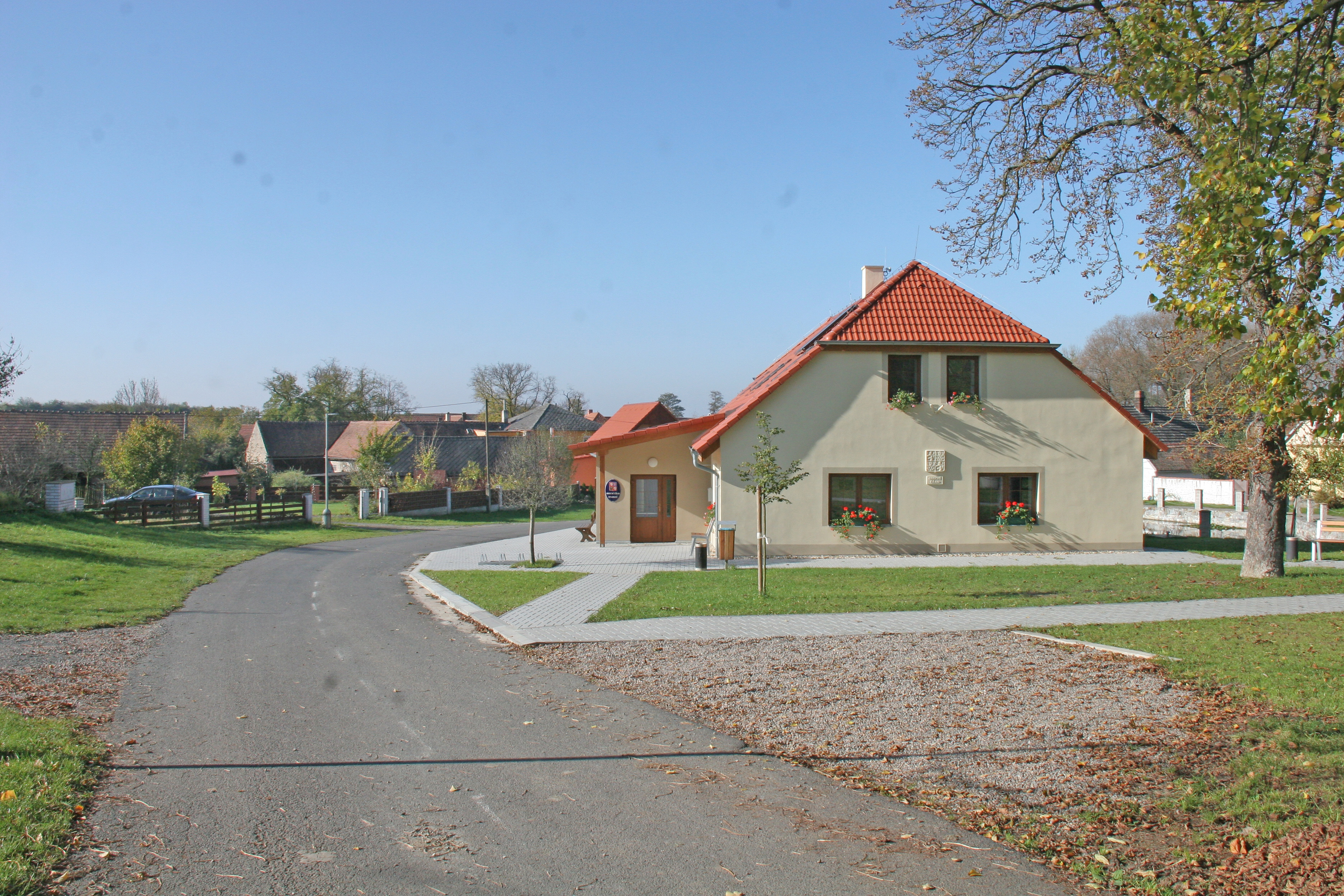
- Centre of Starkoč with the municipal office

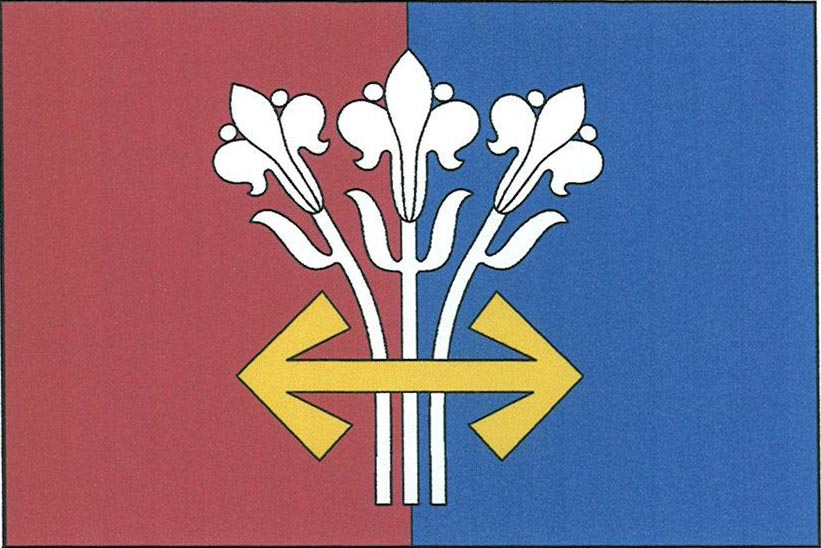
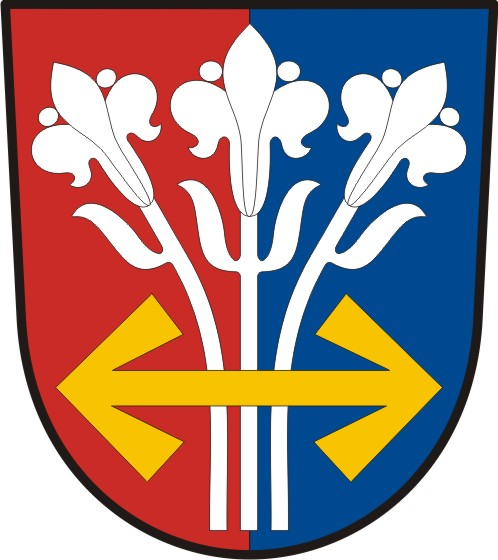
- Flag Coat of arms

- Location in the Czech Republic
- Coordinates: 49°56′14″N 15°30′27″E
- Country: Czech Republic
- Region: Central Bohemian
- District: Kutná Hora
- First mentioned: 1355

Area
  - Total: 4.09 km^{2} (1.58 sq mi)
- Elevation: 250 m (820 ft)

Population (2026-01-01)
  - Total: 155
  - Density: 37.9/km^{2} (98.2/sq mi)
- Time zone: UTC+1 (CET)
  - Summer (DST): UTC+2 (CEST)
- Postal code: 286 01
- Website: www.starkoc.cz

Starkoč is a municipality and village in Kutná Hora District in the Central Bohemian Region of the Czech Republic. It has about 200 inhabitants.

== Geography ==
Starkoč is located about 17 kilometres (11 mi) east of Kutná Hora and 21 km (13 mi) southwest of Pardubice. It lies in an agricultural landscape in the Central Elbe Table. The streams Starkočský potok and Čertovka flow through the municipality.

== History ==
The first written mention of Starkoč is from 1355. Until the 17th century, it was owned by various local noble families. After the Battle of White Mountain, it was acquired by the Trčka of Lípa family. In 1663, when Starkoč already belonged to the Žehušice estate, the estate was bought by the Thun und Hohenstein family.

== Demographics ==
Historical population

Year	Pop.	±%
1869	543	—
1880	568	+4.6%
1890	624	+9.9%
1900	574	−8.0%
1910	572	−0.3%

Year	Pop.	±%
1921	510	−10.8%
1930	503	−1.4%
1950	367	−27.0%
1961	305	−16.9%
1970	229	−24.9%

Year	Pop.	±%
1980	171	−25.3%
1991	114	−33.3%
2001	109	−4.4%
2011	112	+2.8%
2021	140	+25.0%

Source: Censuses

== Transport ==
The I/17 road (the section from Chrudim to Čáslav) runs through the southern part of the municipal territory.

== Sights ==
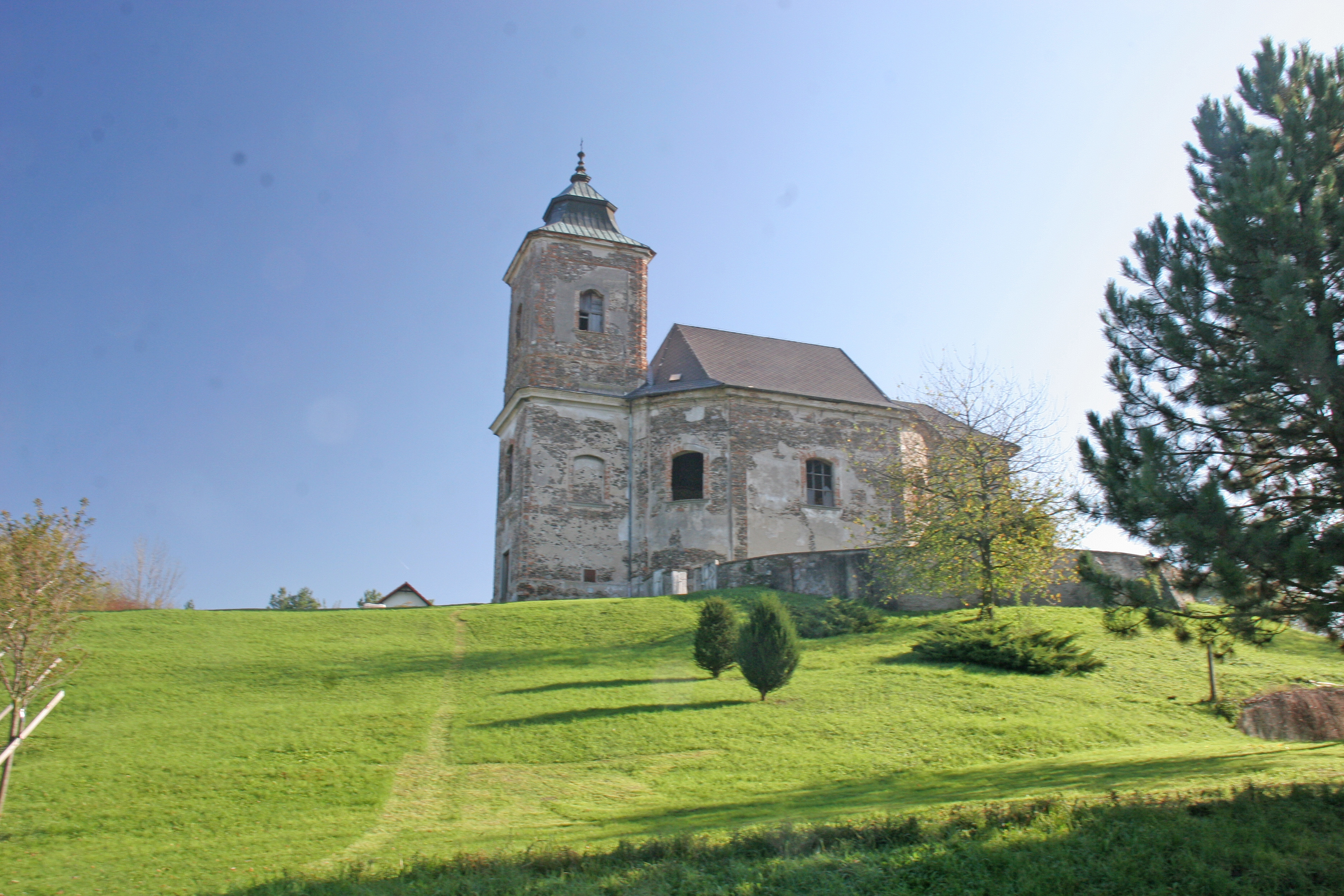
Church of the Assumption of the Virgin Mary

The main landmark of Starkoč is the Church of the Assumption of the Virgin Mary. It is a replica of the type of church designed in 1732 by the architect Kilian Ignaz Dientzenhofer for other two villages in Bohemia. It was built in 1738 on the site of an old church from the mid-14th century.
