= Městec Králové =

- Town
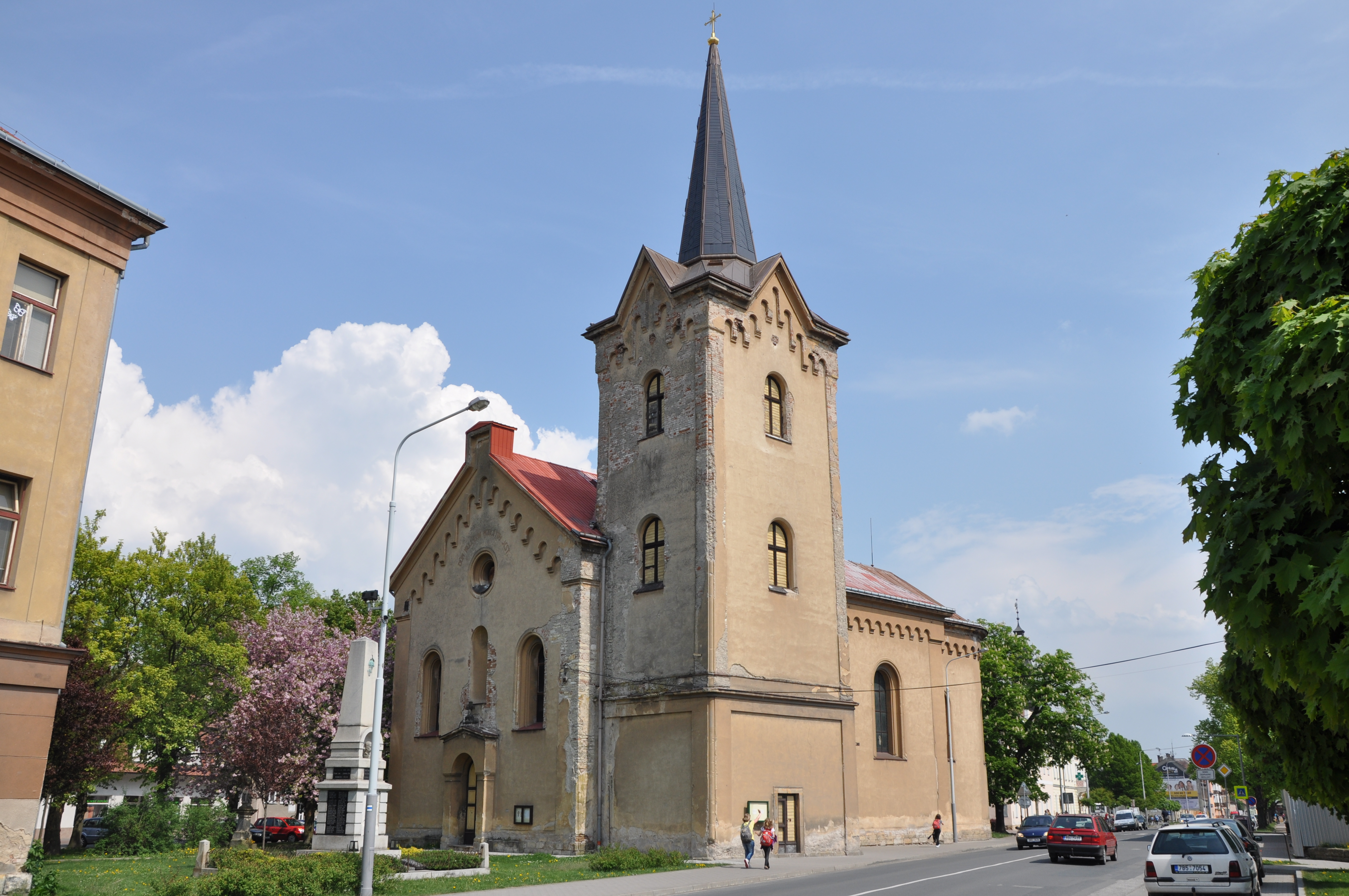
- Church of Saint Margaret

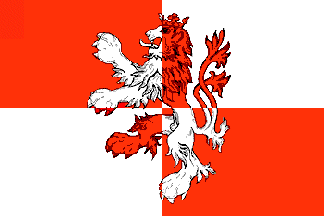
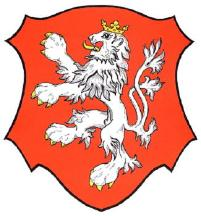
- Flag Coat of arms

- Location in the Czech Republic
- Coordinates: 50°12′23″N 15°17′34″E
- Country: Czech Republic
- Region: Central Bohemian
- District: Nymburk
- First mentioned: 1300

Government
  - Mayor: Milan Pavlík

Area
  - Total: 19.87 km^{2} (7.67 sq mi)
- Elevation: 212 m (696 ft)

Population (2026-01-01)
  - Total: 2,867
  - Density: 144.3/km^{2} (373.7/sq mi)
- Time zone: UTC+1 (CET)
  - Summer (DST): UTC+2 (CEST)
- Postal code: 289 03
- Website: www.mesteckralove.cz

Městec Králové (Czech pronunciation: [ˈmɲɛstɛts ˈkraːlovɛː]; German: Königstädtel) is a town in Nymburk District in the Central Bohemian Region of the Czech Republic. It has about 2,900 inhabitants.

== Administrative division ==
Městec Králové consists of three municipal parts (in brackets population according to the 2021 census):

- Městec Králové (2,649)
- Nový (59)
- Vinice (86)

== Etymology ==
The name means 'small town of the King' in Czech. The initial name of the town was Královo Městce. Later it changed to Králův Městec and then to the current form.

== Geography ==
Městec Králové is located about 18 kilometres (11 mi) east of Nymburk and 54 km (34 mi) east of Prague. It lies in the Central Elbe Table. The highest point is a place called Kostelíček at 241 m (791 ft) above sea level. The stream Štítarský potok flows through the municipal territory.

== History ==
Městec Králové was established as a walled town on the road from Hradec Králové to Prague in the 13th century.

According to legends, Queen Kunigunde, the wife of King Wenceslaus I, was returning from Červený Hradec (today Hradec Králové) to Prague and abruptly gave birth to Ottokar II, the most powerful king of the Přemyslid dynasty, in Městec Králové. Ottokar II rewarded his assumed birthplace by a lion on its coats of arms and some privileges reserved for royal towns.

The town was almost destroyed during the Thirty Years' War and by large fires in 1680, 1746, 1776 and 1792.

== Demographics ==
Historical population

Year	Pop.	±%
1869	2,628	—
1880	2,908	+10.7%
1890	2,899	−0.3%
1900	2,823	−2.6%
1910	3,002	+6.3%

Year	Pop.	±%
1921	3,292	+9.7%
1930	3,444	+4.6%
1950	3,098	−10.0%
1961	3,095	−0.1%
1970	2,925	−5.5%

Year	Pop.	±%
1980	2,973	+1.6%
1991	3,022	+1.6%
2001	2,920	−3.4%
2011	2,829	−3.1%
2021	2,794	−1.2%

Source: Censuses

== Transport ==
Městec Králové is the start of a railway line to Chlumec nad Cidlinou.

== Sights ==
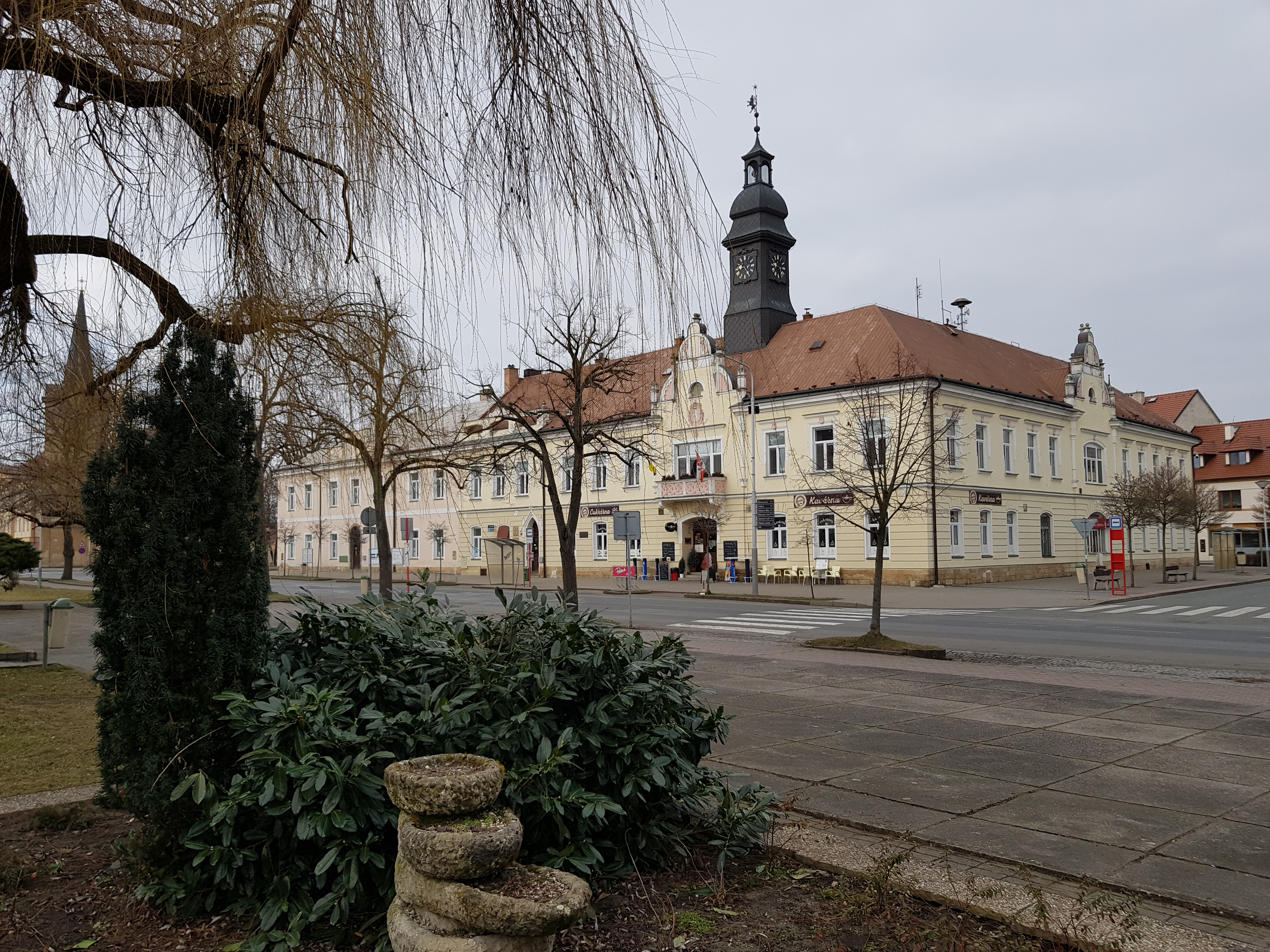
Town hall

The main landmark of Městec Králové is the Church of Saint Margaret. It was built in 1793, after a fire in 1792 burned down the old building. In the 19th century, the church was repaired and the Romanesque tower was added.

Among the most valuable buildings is the town hall, built in 1799.

== Notable people ==
- Ottokar II of Bohemia (1233–1278), King of Bohemia
- František Xaver Pokorný (1729–1794), composer and violinist
- Karel Kněžourek (1857–1920), naturalist
- Otakar Zich (1879–1934), composer and aesthetician
- Karel Schulz (1899–1943), writer
- Ivan Hašek (born 1963), football player and manager
- Aleš Hruška (born 1985), footballer
- Bořek Dočkal (born 1988), footballer
