= Birdlife (disambiguation) =

Birdlife may refer to:

- Bird, a winged, egg-laying, vertebrate animal.
- Bird Life, a book on Australian birds.
- BirdLife International (BLI), an international conservation organisation with national partners around the world
  - BirdLife Australia, BLI national partner
  - BirdLife Cyprus, BLI national partner
  - BirdLife Malta, BLI national partner
  - BirdLife South Africa, BLI national partner
  - SOS/BirdLife Slovakia, BLI national partner

== See also ==
- List of Birdlife International national partner organisations
