= List of BirdLife International national partner organisations =

The following is a list of the BirdLife International national partner organisations for each country:

== A ==
- Afghanistan – None
- Albania – None
- Algeria – None
- Andorra – None
- Angola – None
- Antarctica – None
- Antigua and Barbuda – None
- Argentina – Aves Argentinas
- Armenia – None
- Australia – BirdLife Australia
- Austria – BirdLife Austria
- Azerbaijan – None

== B ==
- Bahamas – Bahamas National Trust (BNT)
- Bahrain – None
- Bangladesh – None
- Barbados – None
- Belarus – None
- Belgium – Natagora (Wallonia) and Natuurpunt (Flanders)
- Belize - Belize Audubon Society
- Benin – None
- Bhutan – Royal Society for the Protection of Nature
- Bolivia – Asociacion Armonía
- Bosnia and Herzegovina – None
- Botswana – BirdLife Botswana (BLB)
- Brazil – SAVE Brasil
- Brunei – None
- Bulgaria – Bulgarian Society for the Protection of Birds (BSPB)
- Burkina Faso – NATURAMA
- Burundi – Association Burundaise pour la protection de la Nature (ABN)

== C ==
- Cambodia – BirdLife International Cambodia Programme/NatureLife Cambodia
- Cameroon – None
- Canada – Birds Canada and Nature Canada
- Cape Verde – Biosfera
- Central African Republic – None
- Chad – None
- Chile – Comité Nacional Pro Defensa de la Flora y Fauna (CODEFF)
- China – Hong Kong Bird Watching Society
- Colombia – Asociación Calidris
- Comoros – None
- Democratic Republic of the Congo – None
- Republic of the Congo – None
- Cook Islands – Taporoporo'anga Ipukarea Society
- Costa Rica – None
- Croatia – Association BIOM
- Cuba – Centro Nacional de Áreas Protegidas (CNAP)
- Cyprus – BirdLife Cyprus
- Czech Republic – Czech Society for Ornithology

== D ==
- Denmark – BirdLife Denmark/Dansk Ornitologisk Forening (DOF)
- Djibouti – None
- Dominica – None
- Dominican Republic – Grupo Jaragua (GJI)

== E ==
- East Timor – None
- Ecuador – Aves y Conservación and Fundación de Conservación Jocotoco (affiliate)
- Egypt – Nature Conservation Egypt
- El Salvador – Fundación Ecológica Salva Natura
- Equatorial Guinea – None
- Eritrea – None
- Estonia – BirdLife Estonia
- Eswatini – None
- Ethiopia – The Ethiopian Wildlife and Natural History Society (EWNHS)

== F ==
- Falklands Islands (a British overseas territory) - Falklands Conservation
- Faroe Islands (a Danish overseas territory) – Faroese Ornithological Society
- Fiji – NatureFiji-MareqetiViti
- Finland – BirdLife Finland
- France – Ligue pour la Protection des Oiseaux
- French Polynesia (a French overseas territory) – Société d’Ornithologie de Polynésie (MANU)

== G ==
- Gabon – None
- Gambia – None
- Georgia – Society for Nature Conservation (SABUCO)
- Germany – Naturschutzbund Deutschland (NABU)
- Ghana – Wildlife Society (GWS)
- Gibraltar (a British overseas territory) – Gibraltar Ornithological & Natural History Society (GOHNS)
- Greece – Hellenic Ornithological Society (HOS)
- Grenada – None
- Guatemala – None
- Guinea – Guinée-Ecologie
- Guinea-Bissau – None
- Guyana – None

== H ==
- Haiti – None
- Honduras – None
- Hungary – Magyar Madártani és Természetvédelmi Egyesület (MME)

== I ==
- Iceland – Fuglavernd - BirdLife Iceland (ISPB)
- India – Bombay Natural History Society
- Indonesia – Burung Indonesia
- Iran – None
- Iraq – Nature Iraq
- Ireland – BirdWatch Ireland
- Israel – Society for the Protection of Nature in Israel (SPNI)
- Italy – Lega Italiana Protezione Uccelli (LIPU)
- Ivory Coast – SOS-FORETS (SF)

== J ==
- Jamaica – None
- Japan – Wild Bird Society of Japan (WBSJ)
- Jordan – Royal Society for the Conservation of Nature (RSCN)

== K ==
- Kazakhstan – Association for the Conservation of Biodiversity of Kazakhstan (ACBK)
- Kenya – NatureKenya
- Kiribati – None
- Kuwait – Environment Protection Society (KEPS)
- Kyrgyzstan – None

== L ==
- Laos – None
- Latvia – Latvian Ornithological Society (LOB)
- Lebanon – The Society for the Protection of Nature in Lebanon (SPNL)
- Lesotho – None
- Liberia – The Society for Conservation of Nature in Liberia (SCNL)
- Libya – None
- Liechtenstein – Botanish-Zoologische Gesellschaft (BZG)
- Lithuania – Lithuanian Ornithological Society (LOD)
- Luxembourg – natur&ëmwelt

== M ==
- Madagascar – Asity Madagascar
- Malawi – Wildlife and Environmental Society of Malawi (WESM)
- Malaysia – Malaysian Nature Society (MNS)
- Maldives – None
- Mali – None
- Malta – BirdLife Malta
- Marshall Islands – None
- Mauritania – Nature Mauritanie
- Mauritius – The Mauritian Wildlife Foundation
- Mexico – Pronatura
- Micronesia – None
- Moldova – None
- Monaco – None
- Mongolia – Wildlife Science and Conservation Center of Mongolia
- Montenegro – Center for Protection and Research of birds of Montenegro (CZIP)
- Morocco – GREPOM/BirdLife Maroc
- Mozambique – None
- Myanmar – Biodiversity and Nature Conservation in Myanmar (BANCA)

== N ==
- Namibia – None
- Nauru – None
- Nepal – Bird Conservation Nepal (BCN)
- Netherlands – Vogelbescherming Nederland (VBN)
- New Caledonia (a French overseas territory) – Société Calédonienne d’Ornithologie (SCO)
- New Zealand – Forest & Bird
- Nicaragua – None
- Niger – None
- Nigeria – Nigerian Conservation Foundation (NCF)
- North Korea – None
- North Macedonia - Macedonian Ecological Society (MES)
- Norway – BirdLife Norge

== O ==
- Oman – None

== P ==
- Pakistan – Ornithological Society of Pakistan
- Palau – Palau Conservation Society (PCS)
- State of Palestine – Palestine Wildlife Society (PWLS)
- Panama – Panama Audubon Society
- Papua New Guinea – None
- Paraguay – Guyra Paraguay
- Peru – Asociación Ecosistemas Andinos
- Philippines – Haribon Foundation
- Poland – Polish Society for the Protection of Birds (OTOP)
- Portugal – Portuguese Society for the Study of Birds (SPEA)
- Puerto Rico (a US overseas territory) – Sociedad Ornitológica Puertorriqueña, Inc. (SOPI)

== Q ==
- Qatar – None

== R ==
- Romania – Romanian Ornithological Society (SOR) / BirdLife Romania
- Russia – None
- Rwanda – None

== S ==
- Saint Kitts and Nevis – None
- Saint Lucia – None
- Saint Vincent and the Grenadines – None
- Samoa – None
- San Marino – None
- São Tomé and Príncipe – None
- Saudi Arabia – None
- Senegal – Nature-Communautés-Développement
- Serbia – Bird Protection and Study Society of Serbia
- Seychelles – Nature Seychelles
- Sierra Leone – The Conservation Society of Sierra Leone (CSSL)
- Singapore – Nature Society (NSS)
- Slovakia – SOS/BirdLife Slovakia
- Slovenia – BirdLife Slovenia (DOPPS)
- Solomon Islands – None
- Somalia – None
- South Africa – BirdLife South Africa (BLSA)
- South Korea – None
- South Sudan – None
- Spain – SEO/BirdLife
- Sri Lanka – Field Ornithology Group of Sri Lanka (FOGSL)
- Sudan – None
- Suriname – Foundation for Nature Conservation in Suriname
- Sweden – BirdLife Sverige
- Switzerland – BirdLife Switzerland
- Syria – The Syrian Society for the Conservation of Wildlife (SSCW)

== T ==
- Tajikistan – None
- Tanzania – Nature Tanzania
- Thailand – Bird Conservation Society of Thailand (BCST)
- Togo – None
- Tonga – None
- Trinidad and Tobago – None
- Tunisia – Association Les Amis des Oiseaux (AAO)
- Turkey – Doğa
- Turkmenistan – None
- Tuvalu – None

== U ==
- Uganda – Nature Uganda
- Ukraine – Ukrainian Society for the Protection of Birds (USPB)
- United Arab Emirates – None
- United Kingdom – Royal Society for the Protection of Birds (RSPB)
- United States of America – National Audubon Society and American Bird Conservancy
- Uruguay – Aves Uruguay (GUPECA)
- Uzbekistan – Uzbekistan Society for the Protection of Birds (UzSPB)

== V ==
- Vanuatu – None
- Venezuela – None
- Vietnam – BirdLife International in Vietnam

== Y ==
- Yemen – None

== Z ==
- Zambia – BirdWatch Zambia
- Zimbabwe – BirdLife Zimbabwe (BLZ)

== Sources ==
- Europe and Central Asia
- Asia
- Middle East
- Africa
- The Americas
- Pacific
