= 2015 Maltese spring hunting referendum =

- 11 April 2015
- Do you agree that the provisions of the 'Framework for Allowing a Derogation Opening a Spring Hunting Season for Turtle Dove and Quail Regulations' (Subsidiary Legislation 504.94) should continue in force?

Results
| Choice | Votes | % |
|---|---|---|
| Yes | 126,434 | 50.44% |
| No | 124,214 | 49.56% |
| Valid votes | 250,648 | 99.01% |
| Invalid or blank votes | 2,509 | 0.99% |
| Total votes | 253,157 | 100.00% |
| Registered voters/turnout | 338,450 | 74.8% |

A referendum on spring hunting was held in Malta on 11 April 2015. Voters voted narrowly in favour of retaining the spring hunt, with 50.4% voting for the existing law to remain in place. Voter turnout was 74.8%.

== Background ==
In August 2013 a petition to ban spring hunting was started by the Coalition for the Abolition of Spring Hunting, which consisted of BirdLife Malta, the Coalition for Animal Rights, the Democratic Alternative, Din l-Art Ħelwa, Flimkien għal Ambjent Aħjar, Friends of the Earth, the Gaia Foundation, Greenhouse, International Animal Rescue Malta, the Malta Organic Agriculture Movement, Moviment Graffitti, Nature Trust Malta, the Ramblers Association Malta and Youth for the Environment. Around 45,000 people signed the petition, triggering a referendum.

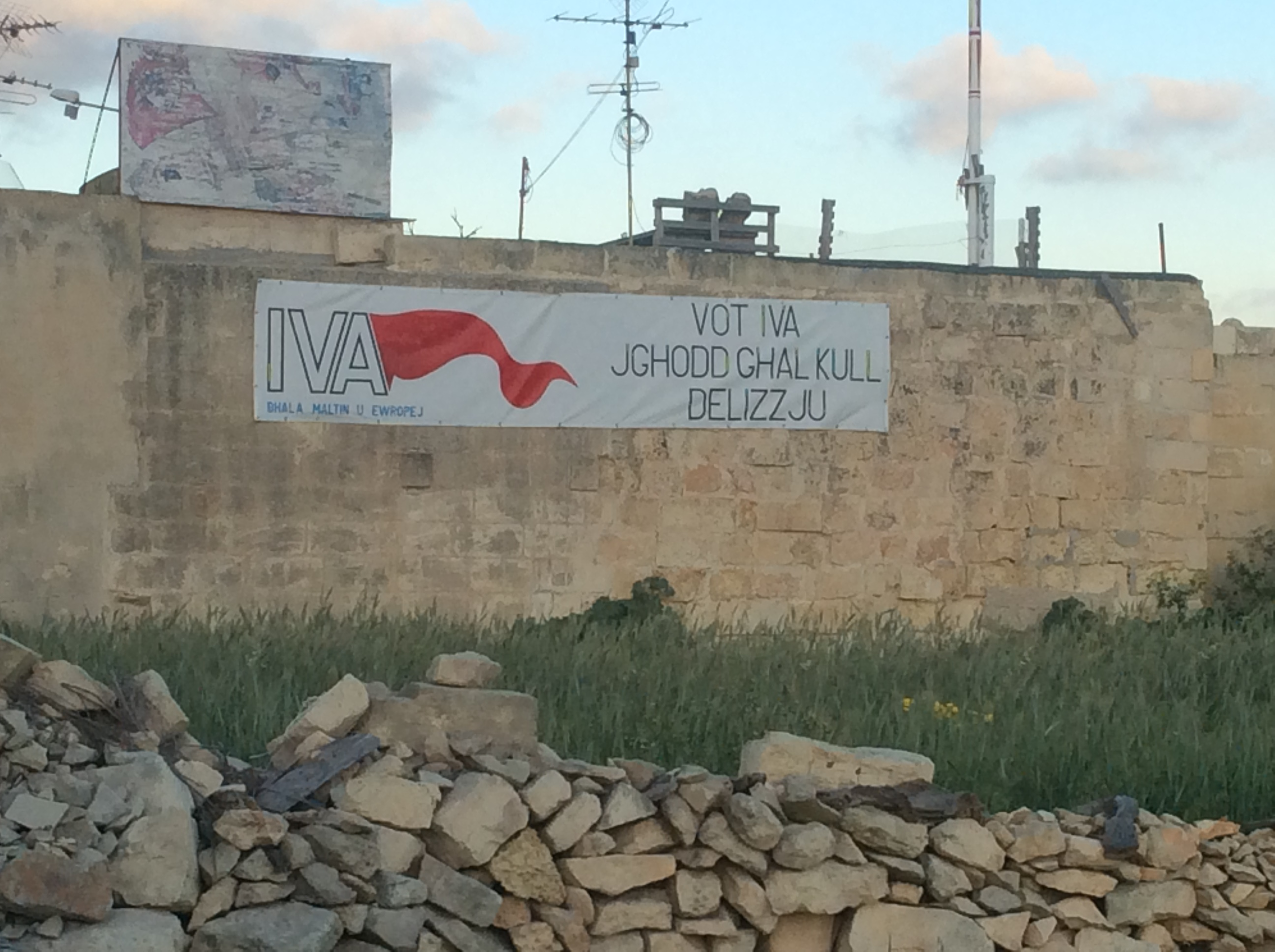
Banner in favour of spring hunting in Naxxar road

Birdlife Malta said that the number of turtle doves declined by 77% between 1980 and 2015. A 2007 study by the European Commission said that hunting was a medium-level threat to the turtle dove (with loss of breeding habitat in the EU being described as high-level), and described spring hunting as particularly concerning.

The Hunter's Federation (FKNK) and St Hubert Hunters (KSU) filed a petition at the Constitutional Court in an attempt to stop the referendum being held, saying it would violate the country's European Union treaty obligations. The FKNK said the petition had 104,293 signatures, making it the largest in Maltese history. However, the court dismissed their claim on 9 January 2015, and also ordered the FKNK and KSU to pay court costs. In 2009 the European Court of Justice had found that Malta was breaching its EU treaty obligations by allowing the spring hunt. However, successive governments passed legislation allowing it to continue. Malta is the only country in the EU to allow spring hunting for recreational purposes. Only two species, turtle doves and quails, are allowed to be shot, with quotas of 11,000 and 5,000 bird respectively. This quota is set annually, based on how many birds were reported killed the previous autumn. Hunters are required to report their kills to the government. According to the Maltese government, 805 turtle doves and 151 quail were reported as killed in the 2012 spring hunting season.

== Result ==
The question voted on in the referendum was "Do you agree that the provisions of the ‘Framework for Allowing a Derogation Opening a Spring Hunting Season for Turtle Dove and Quail Regulations’ (Subsidiary Legislation 504.94) should continue in force?"

| Choice | Votes | % |
|---|---|---|
| For | 126,434 | 50.44 |
| Against | 124,214 | 49.56 |
| Total | 250,648 | 100.00 |
| Valid votes | 250,648 | 99.01 |
| Invalid/blank votes | 2,509 | 0.99 |
| Total votes | 253,157 | 100.00 |
| Registered voters/turnout | 338,450 | 74.80 |
Source: ECM

== Aftermath ==
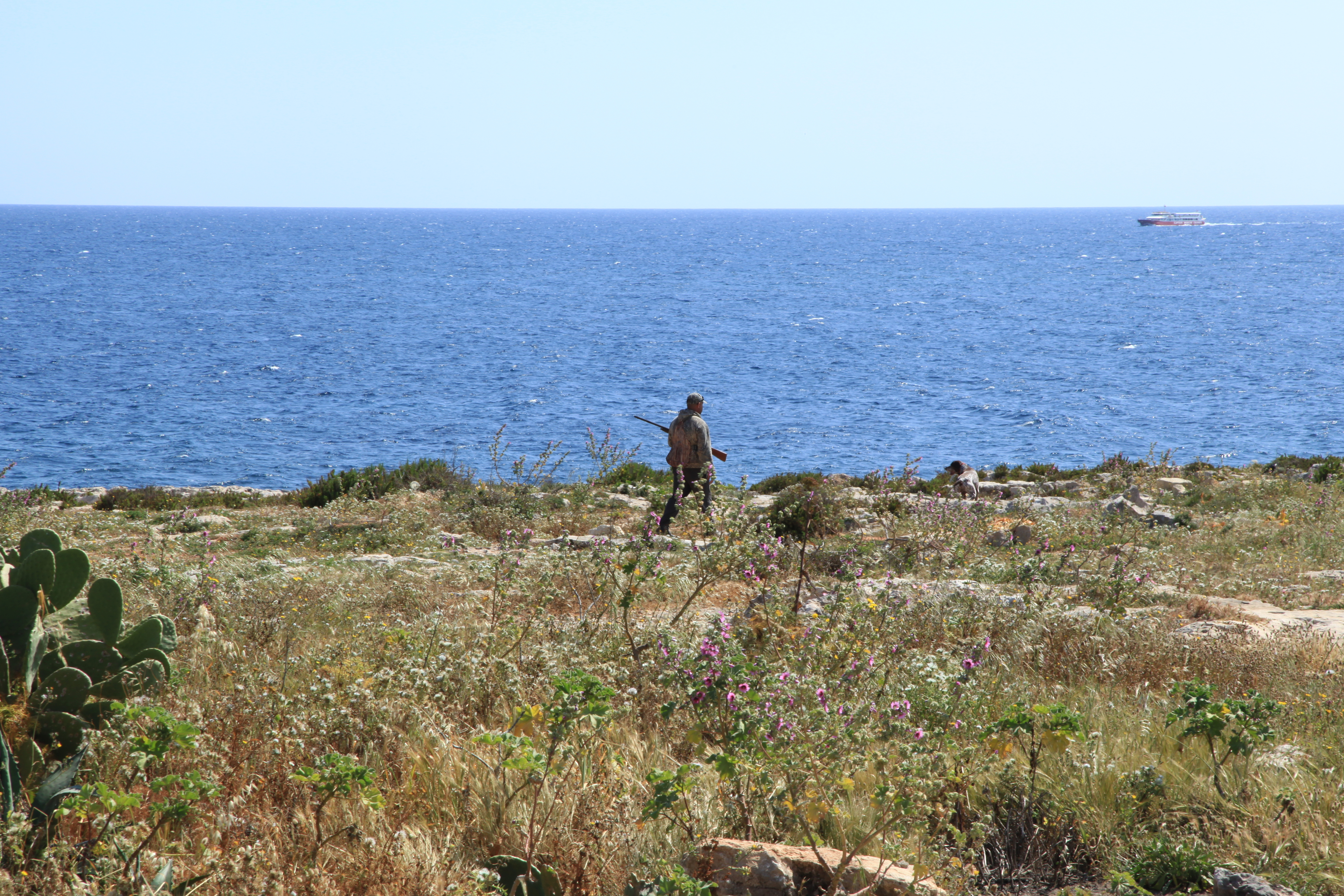
Hunter in Qalet Marku, Naxxar, in spring 2014

When the results of the referendum were out, Prime Minister Joseph Muscat announced that the spring hunting season would open on 14 April. He warned hunters to be careful, and he said they were being given a 'final chance' and no abuse will be tolerated.

During the season, there were six illegalities, which is much fewer than in previous years. A particular incident involved a Dutch boy being accidentally hit by pellets fired by a hunter. On 27 April, a kestrel was illegally shot at, and the injured bird fell in the yard of St. Edward's College in Birgu. Muscat called this incident "inexcusable" and closed the season immediately. This decision was welcomed by the Coalition Against Spring Hunting, the Nationalist Party, the Democratic Alternative and BirdLife Malta. The pro-hunting lobby, consisting of FKNK and KSU, condemned the incident and called for those responsible to be brought to justice. Birdlife Malta said that it reported 9 incidents and in addition, a total of 63 illegal bird callers were detected by CABS during this hunting season.
