= 33, Cathedral Street =

Carmen House
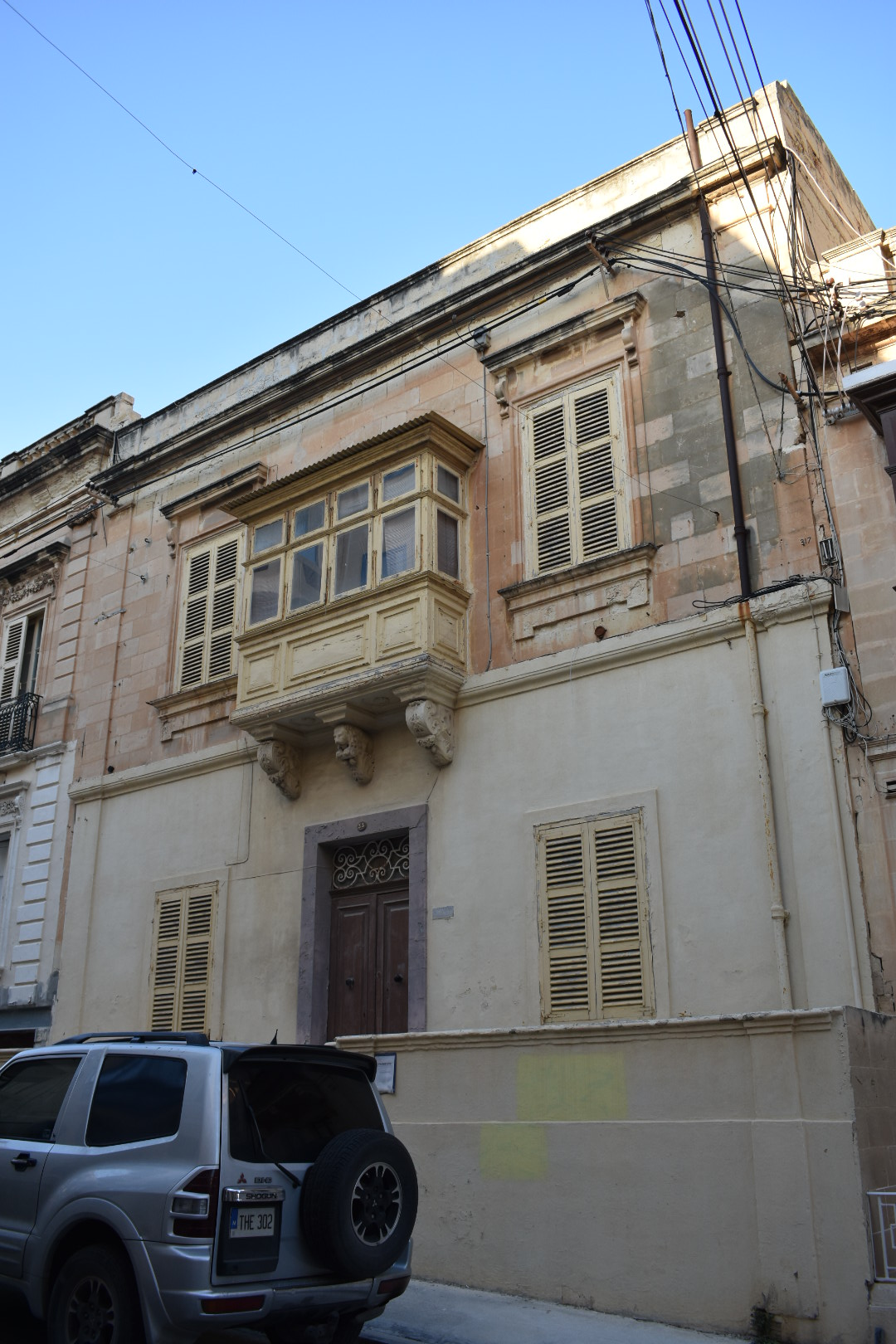
- 33, Cathedral Street
- Interactive map of the Carmen House area

General information
- Status: Intact
- Type: Townhouse
- Architectural style: Vernacular Baroque
- Location: Sliema, Malta
- Coordinates: 35.911372°N 14.504968°E
- Current tenants: Uninhabited
- Construction started: 1870
- Completed: 1870
- Owner: Private Property

Technical details
- Material: Limestone

Carmen is a late 19th-century townhouse at 33, Cathedral Street, Sliema, Malta. The residence was purposely built, and used, by Catholic clergy as a residence and for general community services. It was built and completed in 1870 by the Mdina Cathedral. It was used for its original purpose for less than two decades, after which went through adaptive reuse.

Today the townhouse lies in the Urban Conservation Area (UCA). It is considered a historic house, however has been the subject for demolition due to its site being of high economic interest for high rise development. It is currently in good condition but left neglected. An application to develop the site into flat has been refused in March 2019.

== History ==
Sliema developed into a town during the British Crown Colony of Malta, when several townhouses were built both by the British and by the Maltese. It was common for the Maltese to build their houses in the vernacular style, mixed with some influence of the period.

The Mdina Cathedral took the decision to build a modest building at 33, Cathedral Street, to serve as residence for Roman Catholic clergymen who had the purpose to serve the ever-growing community in Sliema. The townhouse was completed and started to be used from 1870. It served for its original premise for about sixteen years, when in 1886 it changed purpose. A coat-of-arms in the entrance is representative of its original use.

It later went under different adaptive reuse and changed ownership several times. At one point it was the home of an elderly woman who was renting it from third parties. As the woman required more dependence on carers due to age, she moved to an elderly home care. She left the house vacant but continued to pay the low rent based on her contract, which was agreed upon several years before. The contract also implied that she was to use the property as a residence, but after moving out, it was claimed by the owners that she no longer uses the building as per contract as officially she was living elsewhere. The owners used this reason in order to get their valuable property in their hands, using the clause of contract in their favour.

Over the years, several townhouses in the area were demolished, were partially demolished or were subject to redevelopment for several reasons. The building lies in the core of high commercial and other economic interests, and has become subject to be completely demolished to build a high rise building on its site.

The building is a landmark and lies in the Urban Conservation Area (UCA) of Sliema. The iconic and sentimental building is a historic house but enjoys no significant protection, such as other immediate vicinity buildings that are either scheduled, listed as National Monuments or both.

The Planning Authority (PA) has received a demolition application in 2017, which is now subject to a board decision over the matter. General opinion, from people not connected to the economic interest, is in favour of conserving the building, and to avoid a domino effect for other buildings in the area. It is also argued that further development in the area would increase congestion and impact on the people already residing in the area.

On a political level, the Partit Demokratiku (Democratic Party) has advocated for its conservation and showed its concern if the demolition would be given the go ahead. The spokesperson for the party said that:

Its destruction would set a precedent for neighbouring

buildings of cultural and heritage value to Malta and
negatively affect the quality of life of residents.

== Architecture ==
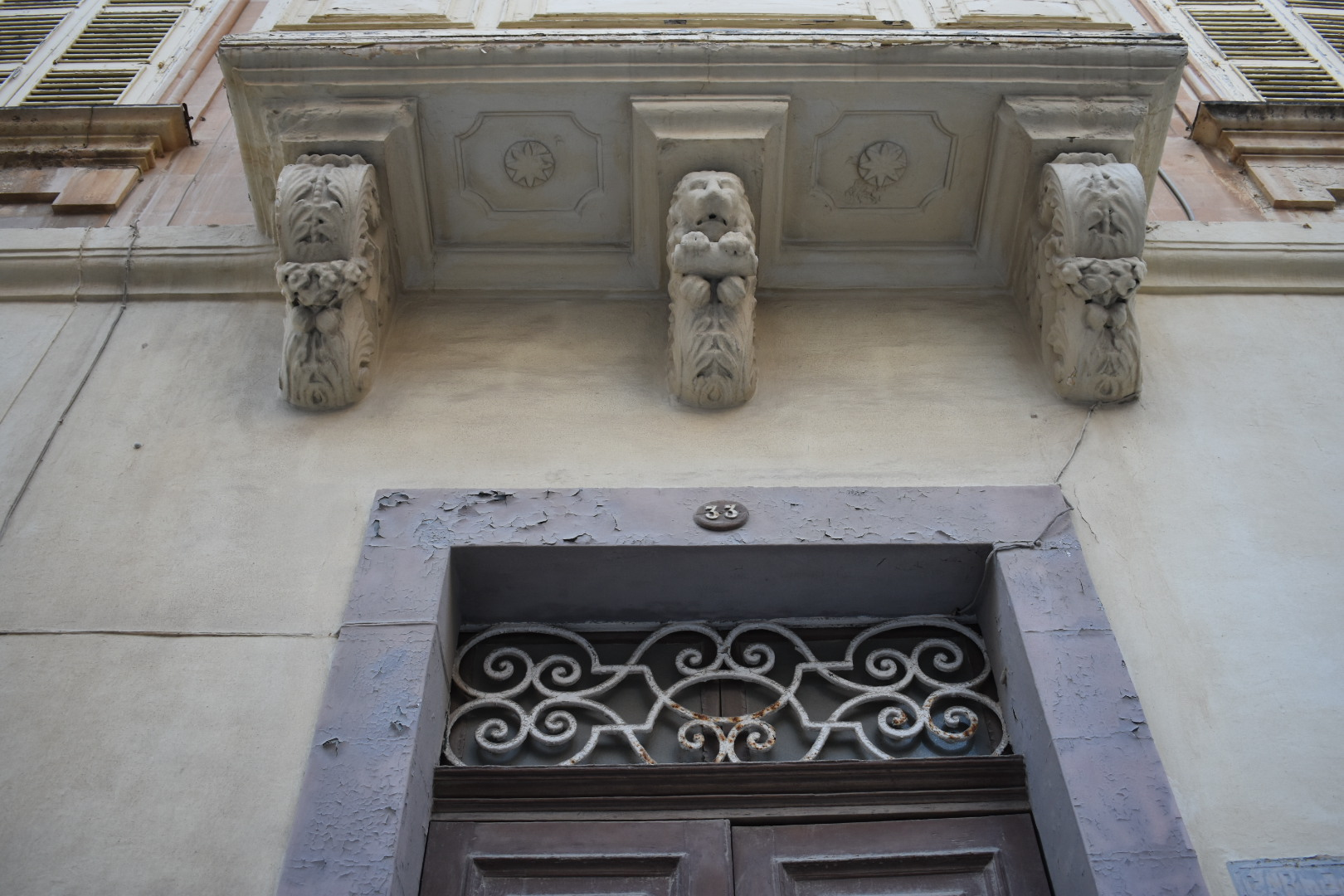
Details on façade

At some point the house was named Carmen. The building is two stories high, with a groundfloor and a first floor. It has a vernacular baroque façade, generally described simply as being vernacular, with a balanced facade and front terrace. The façade is characterized by a main door, with one window on each side on the groundfloor.

The part of the façade on the upper floor has a traditional closed timber balcony, supported by detailed decorative corbels the middle of which having a sculpted head of a lion. Similar to the groundfloor, the upper floor has a window on each side however are complemented by a corbel above each.

The interior of the house is rich in architecture and has been described by the Planning Authority as “consist[ing] of a symmetrical double fronted town-house having a restrained neo-classical exterior with a more lavish internal layout accentuated by fine architectural detailing concentrated in the main hall and main staircase, together with its centralised axis leading from the front door to the ‘nympheum’ at the back of the garden. The town house under consideration is the last in this row of houses which abut it on the left, whilst on the right it is abutted by a single fronted Art Nouveau town house, attributed to Architect Giovanni Psaila who worked prolifically in the Sliema area during the first part of the 20th century and whose most noteworthy work is Balluta Buildings.”

The townhouse has a large back garden, with trees that were planted years ago which are sparse over its grounds. An elaborate niche is found at the very end of the garden.

Since December 2017, the house has been designated as a Grade II building.

== See also ==
- Sliema
- Villa Bonici
- The Green House, Sliema
- Fatima House
- List of monuments in Sliema
- Partit Demokratiku
