= Ambelopoulia =

Traditional Greek Cypriot dish

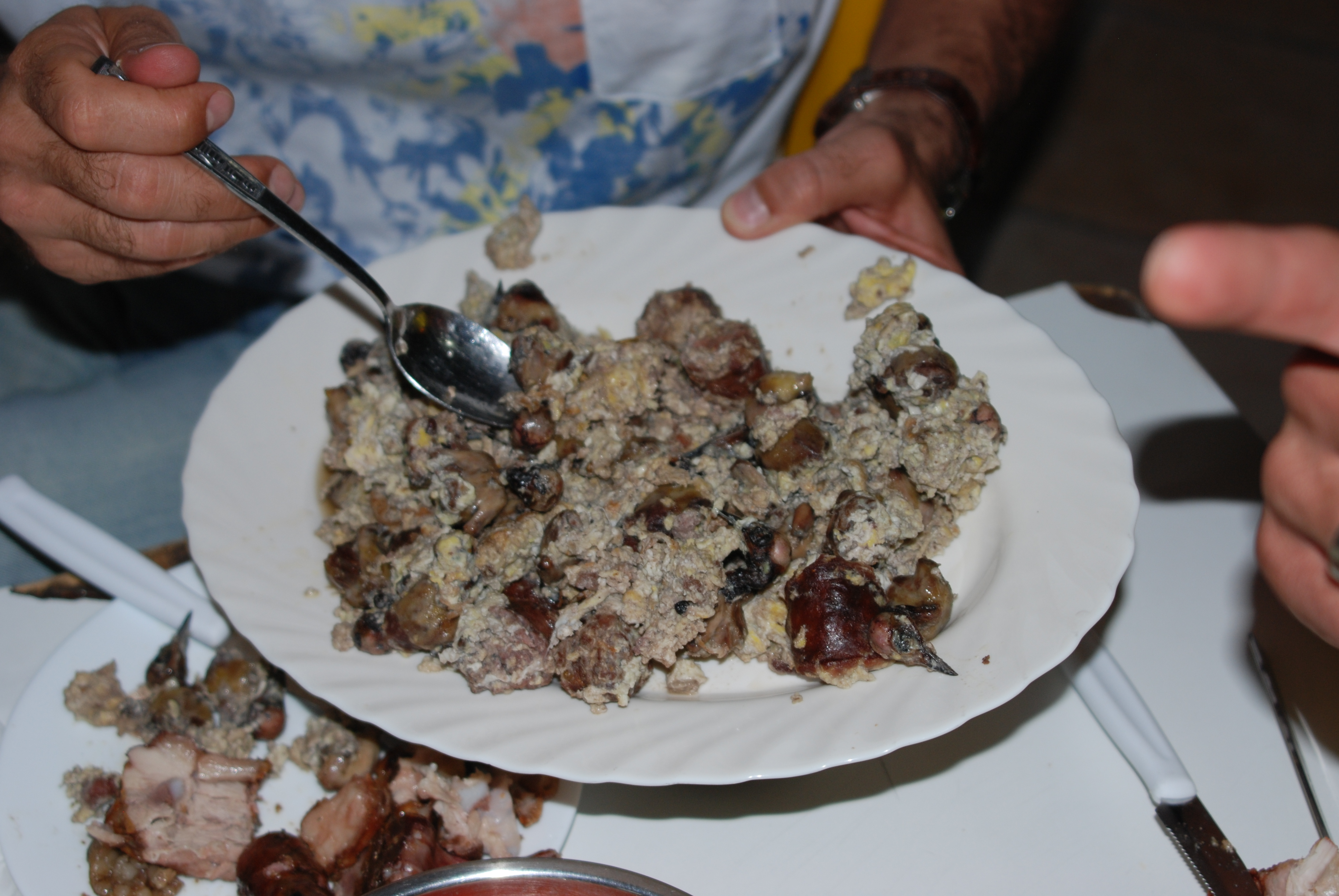
A plate of ambelopoulia

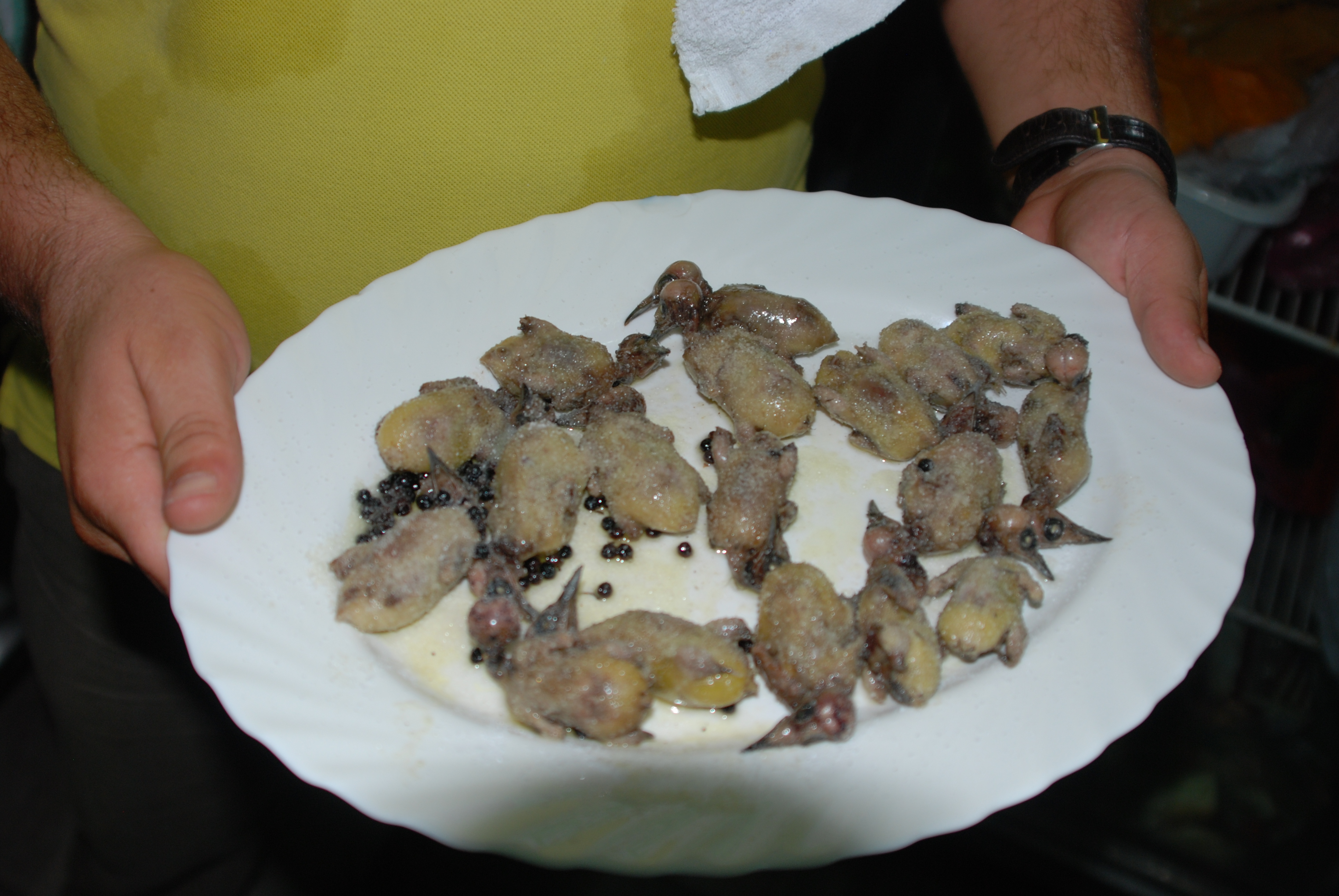
A platter with whole songbirds

Ambelopoulia (Greek: αμπελοπούλια) is a dish of grilled, fried, pickled or boiled songbirds which is a traditional dish enjoyed by native Cypriots and served in some Cypriot restaurants.

== Legality and enforcement ==
It is illegal in Cyprus as it involves trapping wild birds such as blackcaps and European robins. Trapping kills birds indiscriminately, thus internationally protected species of migratory birds are killed as well. Enforcement of the ban has been lax, so many restaurants serve the dish without consequence. As a result, about 2.4 million birds across Cyprus are estimated to have been killed during 2010. According to a BirdLife Cyprus report released in 2014, over 1.5 million migrating songbirds are killed annually, and the number is increasing each year. In 2015 it was estimated that over 2 million birds were killed, including over 800,000 on the British territories Akrotiri and Dhekelia and a further 800,000 on them in autumn 2016.

== Trapping of birds for ambelopoulia ==
The birds are trapped in either of two ways. One method uses black, fine-mesh nylon fishing nets, which are difficult to see, strung between planted acacia trees. Electronic bird calls lure the birds to entangle their wings and legs, or alternatively gravel is brought in by truck and is thrown at the base of the trees to scare the birds into the nets. The other trapping method uses glue sticks made either from the berries of a local tree or birdlime. The glue sticks are placed on the branches of trees, and any birds that perch on them are stuck until the trapper returns to kill them (usually with a tooth pick to the throat). Often the legs of the birds are so stuck to the glue sticks that they need to be pulled off. Protests against the removal of acacia scrub have resulted in 36 hectares (89 acres) remaining in 2016, compared with 56 hectares (140 acres) in 2014.

The trappers defend their activity by citing the practice as traditional Cypriot food gathering and claiming that this has been an important source of protein for the natives for many thousands of years, even though the practice has been illegal since 1974. BirdLife Cyprus has identified restaurants as the main culprits as they provide the financial incentives. The enthusiasm Cypriots and many other visitors to the island have for this delicacy despite its illegality has resulted in the development of a very profitable industry. Poaching for ambelopoulia has been on the rise in recent years, involving by 2011 a "mafia-like operation" that include poachers, dealers, exporters, and restaurant operators that participate in the illegal business estimated to be worth about 5 million euro at that time. The birds reportedly sell for five euros each and it is estimated by Cypriot authorities to have earned criminals on the island 15 million euro in 2015.

== Method of eating ==
Since the entrails of the birds are not removed, as it is not cost-effective to do so, the consumer is encouraged to swallow the bird whole. Unsuspecting diners may be served much cheaper farmed birds such as immature quails by some restaurants.

== See also ==
- Ortolan bunting
