= Leyla Belyalova =

Uzbek ecologist

- Born: 1957 (age 68–69)
- Education: Samarkand State University
- Occupations: Ecologist; academic

Leyla Belyalova (Uzbek: Leylya Enverovna Belyalova; born 1957) is an Uzbek academic and ecologist. For her work to promote and protect Uzbekistan's ecosystems, she was recognised by the BBC as one of its 100 Women in 2018.

== Career ==
Belyalova currently serves as an associate professor in the ecology department at Samarkand State University.

Belyalova's most notable fieldwork includes the surveying, monitoring, and conservation in the Kattakurgan reservoir and the Zarafshan State Nature Reserve. She is also noted for her promotion of the importance of the Amankutan Pass, in the western Pamir-Alay mountain range, as an important site for Uzbek flora and fauna.

Through her work with the Uzbek Society for the Protection of Birds (Uzbek: O'zbekistan Qushlarini Muhofaza Qilish Jamiati, UzSPB), Belyalova has been instrumental in identifying locations across Uzbekistan that meet the criteria to be recognised as Important Bird and Biodiversity Areas (IBA) and Key Biodiversity Areas (KBA) and getting both practical and financial support in having these formally recognised by the Uzbek government.

Belyalova is also a member of the UzSPB's executive committee.

== Recognition ==
In 2018, Belyalova ranked third in the annual Uzbekistan Woman of the Year competition. That same year, she was named as one of the BBC's 100 Women for "seeking to protect Uzbekistan's birdlife and mountain ecosystems".

Belyalova has been recognised as a "Nature's Hero" by Bird Life.

The UzSPB has praised Belyalova for her role in leading "the first attempt by an environmental charity in our region to preserve the wildlife of a site with international importance on a long-term basis".
