= MME =

MME may stand for:

- M^{me} or Mme, the French abbreviation for Madame
- MME, the IATA code for Teesside International Airport, United Kingdom
- MME, Maths Made Easy, an academic resource provider in the United Kingdom
- MME (psychedelic), 2,4-dimethoxy-5-ethoxyamphetamine, a psychedelic drug
- Magyar Madártani és Természetvédelmi Egyesület, Hungarian Ornithological and Nature Conservation Society
- Mass mortality event, the naturally occurring death of large numbers of a species in a short period of time
- Master of Mechanical Engineering, a postgraduate degree; see British degree abbreviations
- Master of Management Engineering (MME)
- Master of Music Education (MME or MMEd)
- Membrane metallo-endopeptidase, an enzyme also named neprilysin
- Michigan Merit Exam, a minimum-competency test for students
- Mitsubishi Motors Europe, the European subsidiary of Mitsubishi Motors
- Mobility Management Entity, a standardized entity in a System Architecture Evolution network dedicated to mobility management
- Morphine milligram equivalents, a measure of opioid potency utilized in pain management
- Middle East Eye, a London-based online news outlet covering events in the Middle East
- Multi-model ensemble, a climate ensemble used in climate change research
- Multimedia Extensions, an extension to Windows 3.0 to support multimedia
- VEB Mikroelektronik "Karl Marx" Erfurt, a division of Kombinat Mikroelektronik Erfurt, in East Germany
- Middle Market Enterprises, 250-2500 FTE, 50M – 300M turnover
