= The Green House, Sliema =

Historic townhouse in Sliema, Malta

The Green House
- Id-Dar il-Ħadra
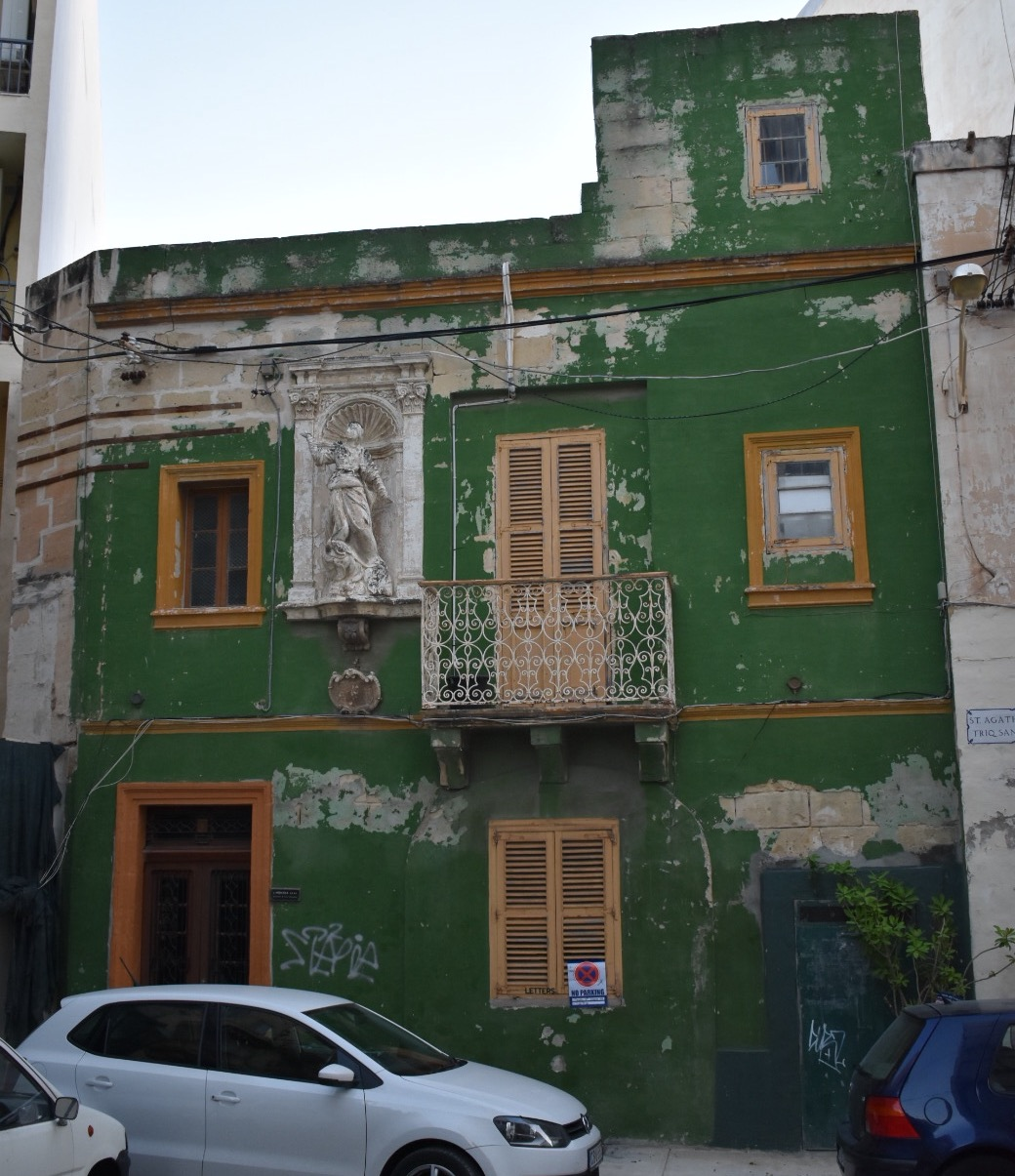
- No. 1, St Agatha Street
- Interactive map of the The Green House area

General information
- Status: Demolished
- Type: Townhouse
- Architectural style: Vernacular, with a Baroque niche
- Location: Sliema, Malta, No. 1, St Agatha Street
- Coordinates: 35°54′31.5″N 14°30′04″E
- Named for: Colour of façade
- Construction started: c. 1875
- Completed: c. 1875
- Demolished: 2019
- Owner: Ray Camilleri

Technical details
- Material: Limestone

The Green House (Maltese: Id-Dar il-Ħadra) was a late 19th-century vernacular townhouse in Sliema, Malta. The historic residence was an icon in the area, situated at the end of St Mary Street of which name of street derives from the niche on the façade of the building. The façade was notably characterized by its dark green colour which had made it a noticeable landmark. The niche of the Assumption of Our Lady, dated to 1875, is listed on the National Inventory of the Cultural Property of the Maltese Islands (NICPMI).

At one point the building was in the parameters of the Urban Conservation Area (UCA), but this status was later retired. The house was demolished in 2019 to build thirteen residences above street level and garages below ground in its place. The landmark niche was incorporated in the new building, as required per permit issues by the Planning Authority.

== History ==
Sliema developed into a town during the period of British colonial rule, when townhouses were built both by the British and by the Maltese. It was common for the Maltese to build their houses in the vernacular style, mixed with some influence of the period.

The building was erected around the mid-nineteenth century to be purposely used as a residence, with the layout of a townhouse. Either from the beginning, or at one point, the façade was painted in dark Green, and houses painted similarly in the immediate vicinity are unknown today. The colour attracts the passers by because of its unusual painted colour, and colloquially became known, as it is still known today, as Id-Dar il-Ħadra. This unofficial name translates to as The Green House. It has been an iconic building and a landmark on its own. The owners of such houses may often be better known for the type of building they live at and sometimes be nicknamed for it; such example in this case would be "The Green House owner (family)" or "The Green House resident(s)" (Maltese: Tad-Dar il-Ħadra).

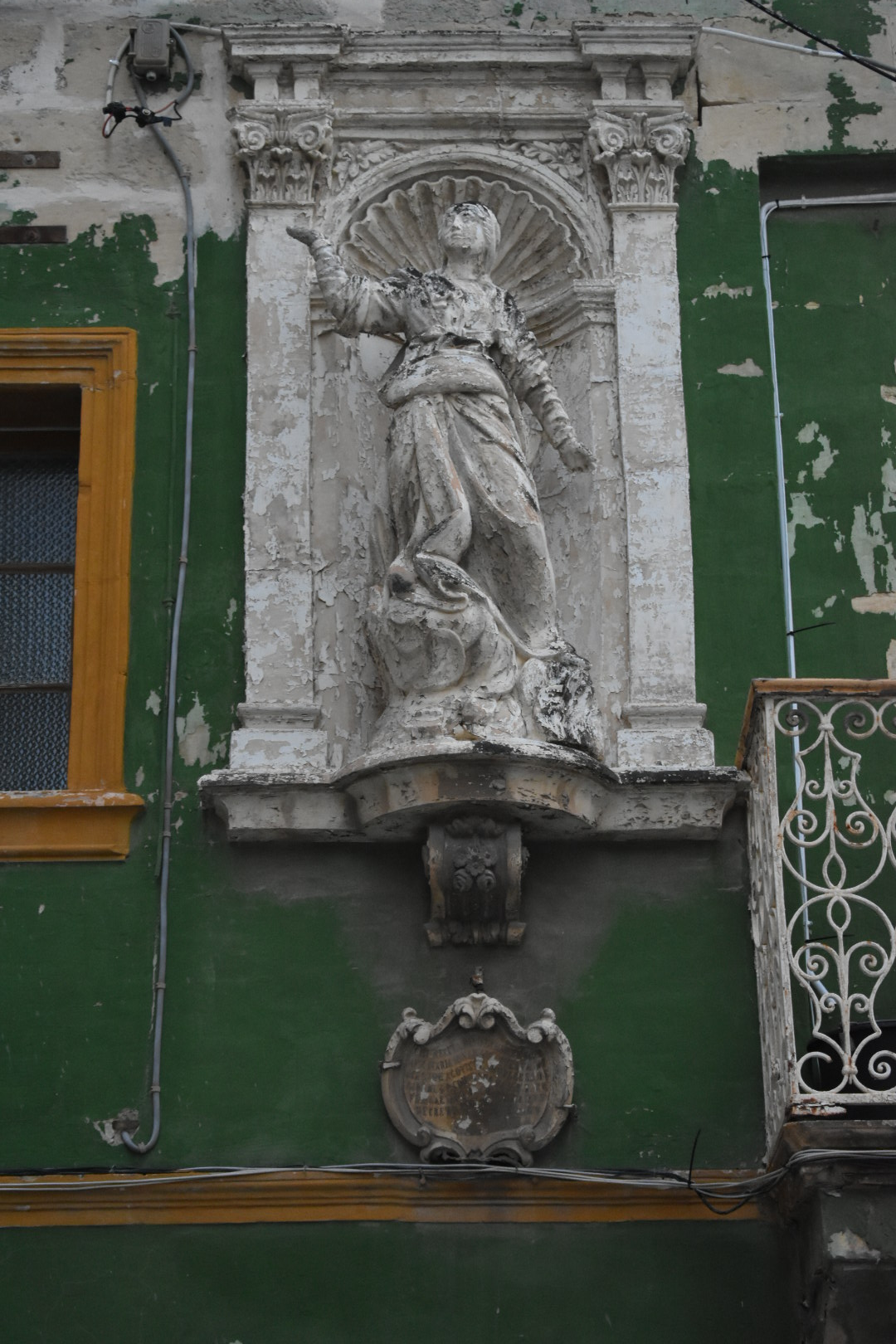
The imposing niche on the façade, a listed monument

Predominantly on the façade sits a Baroque niche where a statue of the Assumption of Our Lady stands. Being one of the first houses to be built in the area, the integral niche gave the name to the street that is found at, as St Mary Street. The later name was likely given as a consequence of the building being visible from different points of the street, which like the name of the house may origin from the residents's given reference. The building is, however, addressed at No. 1, St Agatha Street, exactly at the cross-section of St Mary Street. The niche received the blessing by Bishop Gaetano Pace Forno, who awarded those who prayed in front of it with indulgences. A date is written on the niche as 1875, which is an approximate indication of when the building was built.

The area of the residence was declared as part of the Urban Conservation Area (UCA), for being in the historic core of Sliema. The niche was eventually listed a national monument in Sliema, being on the National Inventory of the Cultural Property of the Maltese Islands (NICPMI). It was listed by the Superintendence for Cultural Heritage (SCH) in the early 21st century.

The building remained a residence throughout the 20th century, after which point became uninhabited and eventually dilapidated. The building became too expensive for the owners to maintain and at the same time it because more profitable to sell to third parties for development. Furthermore, other buildings erected on sides of the building has led to damage in the foundations of the building. The owners saw it was no longer safe not feasible for use.

In the 21st century the area was removed from the UCA status and, years later, the owners of the property applied with the Planning Authority (PA) for the redevelopment of the site, which showed motion to demolish the present building. The application proposes to completely destroy the building, build thirteen residences with underlying garages including a ground floor maisonette with its own entrance, eleven flats and another flat with terrace at the top.

External image
- Planning Authority: PA/03062/17 - Notification Receipt of Development Application

As soon as a notification (PA/03062/17) was attached to the building, the residents, conservationists and interested parties were outraged at the request of the developers. The NGO Flimkien għal Ambjent Aħjar (FAA) and the Sliema Heritage Society (SHS) opposes any development apart from the rehabilitation of the present structure. FAA spokesperson, Environmental Officer Tara Cassar, has pressured the SCH to protect the property. The SCH has agreed and called for its preservation. The SHS has said that further to the detailed niche, the interior of the building also has a decorated interior, characterized by columns at the staircase.

The PA gave its opinion that had had the permission be granted it would request to conserve the entire façade, while dismantling the staircase before demolishing the interior. Based on this preposition, it would follow the concept of facadism, the staircase would be integrated again in the interior, and would destroy the back garden. The Sliema Local Council has objected for its demolition. It is established that the demolition of previous houses has led to a domino effect, and the demolition of The Green House would create major precedence. Residents have insisted on their objection to the proposed development, even as suggested by PA, believing it would impact on them negatively and would destroy a sentimental and historic heritage.

The PA made a final decision to grant the permission for the demolition of the building in February 2019. The house was demolished in March 2019.

== Architecture ==
The Green House was a two-storey building at the inter-section of two streets but is situated on one side. It had a vernacular design, with an asymmetric façade and a Maltese characteristic interior.

== Present building and niche ==
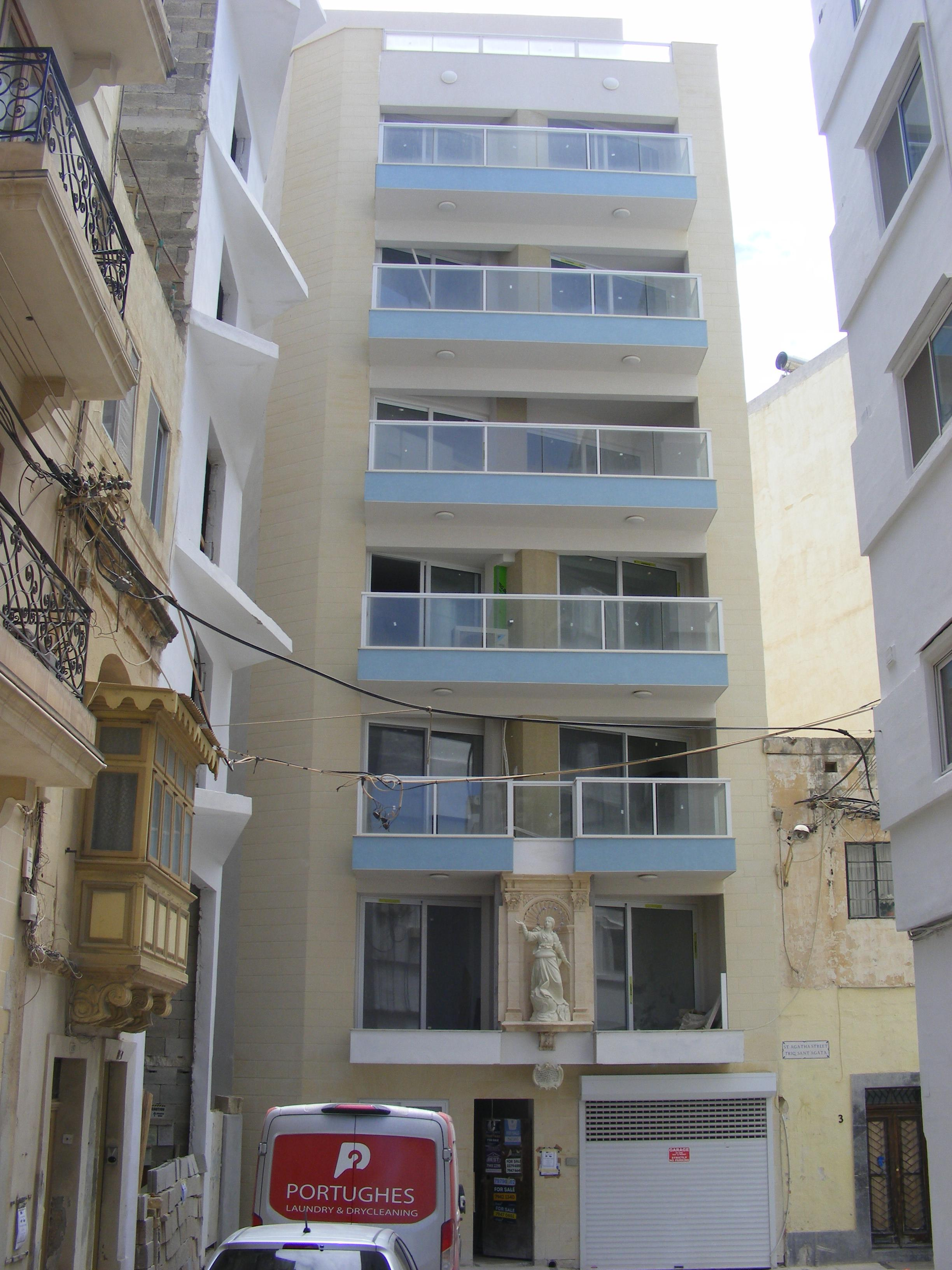
Residential building on the site of "The Green House" (May 2022)

Following its demolition, an eight-floors residential building with underground garages was built. On its façade, between the balconies of the first floor, the renovated niche with the statue of the Madonna, previously located on the façade of the demolished building, was placed. By placing a historic niche dated 1873 on the facade of a modern building was considered controversial by the inhabitants of Sliema and aroused many protests.

== See also ==
- Villa Bonici
- 33, Cathedral Street
- Villa Drago
- The Cloisters, Sliema
- Fatima House
