= Mark Brazil =

British naturalist, conservationist and writer (born 1955)

Dr Mark Andrew Brazil (born 8 June 1955) is a naturalist, conservationist, author and journalist, particularly noted for his work on east Asian birds and Japanese natural history.

Brazil was born in Worcestershire, England, and studied at Keele University, Staffordshire, where he graduated with a double honours BA degree in Biology & English Literature in 1977. In 1981 he received his Ph.D. from Stirling University, Scotland, for his thesis The behavioural ecology of the Whooper Swan. He worked for many years with Japanese natural history television (NHK Science) and then Television New Zealand (TVNZ) and Natural History New Zealand (NHNZ). He has also worked for various other television companies, including the BBC and BBC Radio, as a scientific advisor, contributor and interviewee. From 1998 to 2007 he was professor of Biodiversity and Conservation at Rakuno Gakuen University, Hokkaido. Since 2007 he has been a freelance natural history and travel writer, an editor of scientific papers, and a frequent leader of expeditions in Japan and internationally.

He was previously scientific advisor/researcher for Natural History Television New Zealand; currently: author, editor, lecturer and expedition leader for various expedition companies including Victor Emanuel Nature Tours (VENT). Also consultant and guide trainer for Japan's Ministry of the Environment and Japan's Tourism Agency. Previously a resident of Ebetsu. Since April 2018 he has been based in the Teshikaga area of east Hokkaido, in the buffer zone of the Akan-Mashu National Park.

Brazil was the author of the "Wild Watch" column for The Japan Times newspaper from April 1982 to March 2015, the longest running single-author natural history column in any newspaper. He has been writer in residence for JapanVisitor.com since June 2011.

== Publications ==
Books

- 1987: A Birdwatcher's Guide to Japan, Kodansha America ISBN 0-87011-849-8
- 1991: The Birds of Japan, Christopher Helm Publishers Ltd ISBN 0-7136-8006-7
- 2000: Wild Asia: Spirit of a Continent, Pelican Publishing ISBN 1-56554-827-2
- 2003: The Whooper Swan, ISBN 0-7136-6570-X
- 2009: Birds of East Asia, Helm Field Guides series, A&C Black ISBN 978-0-7136-7040-0
- 2013: The Nature of Japan: From Dancing Cranes to Flying Fish, Japan Nature Guides.
- 2015: Pocket Guide to the Common and Iconic Birds of Japan, Japan Nature Guides.
- 2015: Pocket Guide to the Common and Iconic Mammals of Japan, Japan Nature Guides.
- 2018: Birds of Japan, Helm Field Guides series, A&C Black.
- 2022: Japan The Natural History of an Asian Archipelago, Princeton University Press.

Has also published numerous papers, magazine and newspaper articles in the fields of science, natural history and travel.

== See also ==
- Wild Bird Society of Japan
