= Birds of East Asia =

2009 book by Mark Brazil

- Author: Mark Brazil
- Language: English
- Publication date: 2009

Birds of East Asia is a 2009 book by naturalist Mark Brazil. It lists 985 species of birds resident to East Asia.
