= Ian Rowley =

Australian ornithologist

Ian Cecil Robert Rowley
- Born: 1926
- Died: 29 May 2009 (aged 82–83)
- Education: University of Cambridge; University of Melbourne
- Scientific career
- Fields: Ornithology

Ian Cecil Robert Rowley (1926 – 29 May 2009) was an Australian ornithologist of Scottish origin. He was born in Edinburgh and educated at Wellington College and Cambridge University. Following service in the Royal Navy during the Second World War, he moved to Australia in 1949 and graduated in agricultural science from the University of Melbourne under the Commonwealth Reconstruction Training Scheme.

From 1952, Rowley worked for many years with the CSIRO on animal ecology. He was well known for his extensive studies on fairy-wrens and co-authored the book Fairy-wrens and Grasswrens with Eleanor Russell in 1997. He served the Royal Australasian Ornithologists Union as Editor of Emu (1990–2000). He was elected a Fellow of the RAOU in 1989. In 1991, he was awarded the inaugural D.L. Serventy Medal, which recognises excellence in published work on birds.

== Bibliography ==
- Rowley, Ian. (1975). Bird Life. Australian Naturalist Library. Collins: Sydney.
- Rowley, Ian. (1990). Behavioural Ecology of the Galah, Eolophus roseicapillus, in the Wheatbelt of Western Australia. Surrey Beatty & Sons Pty Ltd: Chipping Norton.
- Rowley, Ian; & Russell, Eleanor. (1997). Fairy-wrens and Grasswrens. Bird Families of the World. No.4. Oxford University Press: Oxford.
