= Hungarian Ornithological and Nature Conservation Society =

Hungarian non-profit organization

The Hungarian Ornithological and Nature Conservation Society (Hungarian: Magyar Madártani és Természetvédelmi Egyesület) (MME), also known as BirdLife Hungary, is a non-profit ornithological and nature conservation organisation founded in Hungary in 1974. Its mission is to protect wild birds and help preserve biodiversity. It has about 10,000 members, employs 26 staff, and is the Hungarian partner organisation of BirdLife International. Since 1991 it has published the journal Ornis Hungarica.

== History ==
MME was formed in 1974 with 200 founding members. Initially it focussed on population surveys of threatened species, later expanding to promotion of, and lobbying for, nature conservation, as well as education and conservation fieldwork programs.

== Activities ==
Animals for which MME has been involved in conservation programs include the meadow viper, imperial eagle, saker falcon, great bustard, and white and black storks. Since 1976 MME has also operated the Hungarian Bird Ringing Centre.

== Ornis Hungarica ==
Ornis Hungarica
- Discipline: Ornithology
- Language: English, Hungarian
- Edited by: Tibor Csörgő

Publication details
- History: 1991–present
- Publisher: BirdLife Hungary (Hungary)
- Frequency: Biannual
- Open access: Yes

Standard abbreviations
- ISO 4: Ornis Hung.

Indexing
- ISSN: 1215-1610 (print); 2061-9588 (web)
- LCCN: 98640187
- OCLC no.: 26516774

Links
- Journal homepage; Online access

Ornis Hungarica is a biannual peer-reviewed open access scientific journal covering ornithology published by the society. It was established in 1991 and is edited by Tibor Csörgő. It concentrates in particular on the birds of Central Europe and Hungary.

== See also ==
- List of BirdLife International national partner organisations
- List of ornithology journals
