= Fatima House =

- Id-Dar ta' Fatima
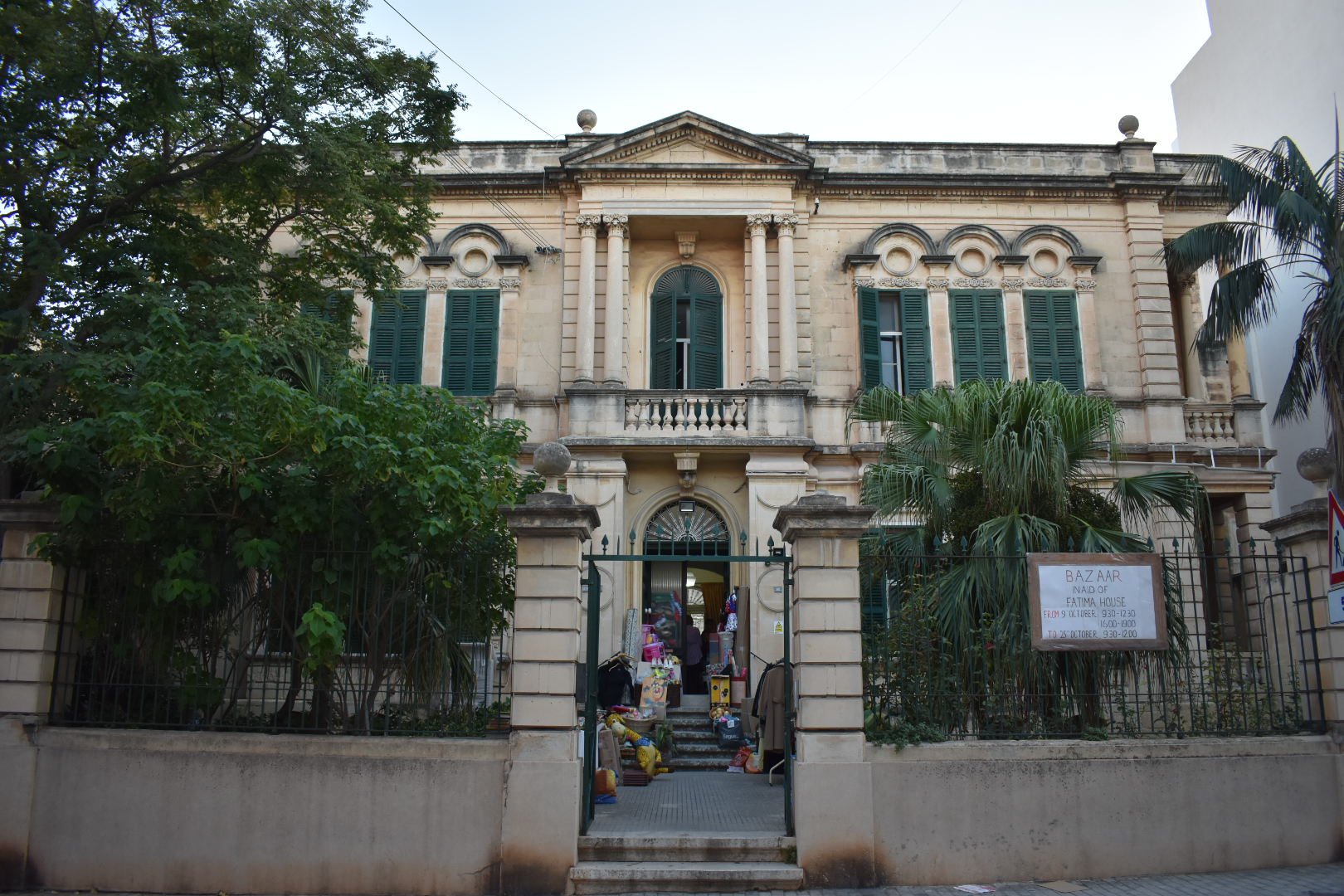
- View of the house during a bazaar
- Interactive map of the Fatima House area

General information
- Status: Intact
- Type: Villa
- Architectural style: Palladian
- Location: Sliema, Malta, 65, High Street Sliema, SLM 1541
- Coordinates: 35°54′43.9″N 14°30′7.8″E
- Current tenants: Ursulines
- Named for: Our Lady of Fátima
- Completed: 1895
- Cost: £662
- Client: Alfonso Maria Galea
- Owner: Roman Catholic Church

Technical details
- Material: Limestone
- Floor count: 2

Design and construction
- Architect: Francesco Zammit

Fatima House (Maltese: Id-Dar ta' Fatima), formerly Villa Bétharram, is a late nineteenth-century villa at 65 High Street, Sliema, Malta. It was purposely built as a family residence for the Galea family, on request of Maltese Senator Alfonso Maria Galea. It is now a residence for females in social needs, sometimes known as Fatima Hostel or Fatima Working Girls' House.

The building was designed by leading Architect Francesco Zammit in the Palladian style and is detached from other buildings, being completely surrounded by gardens. It is a historic house and a Grade II scheduled building. It is one of the few remaining villas in the highly urbanized Sliema whereabouts, giving the idea of how Sliema once was.

== History ==
The site was previously occupied by a historic larger building known as the Hunter's Palace. It was built in the early British colonial period, when most of Sliema consisted of fields and open spaces. This served as a hunting lodge for years and was decided to replace it with two villas when the now demolished lodge was inherited between the brothers-in-law Alfonso Maria Galea and Agostino Borg Cardona.

The site in Sliema and the whereabouts saw major development during the Crown Colony of Malta, when British and Maltese developed the place from a fishing village to a vibrant town of differing architecture. The most prominent Maltese acquired plots in the whereabout of the current villa and built stately homes with imposing architecture, as a symbol of their position and for personal commodities.

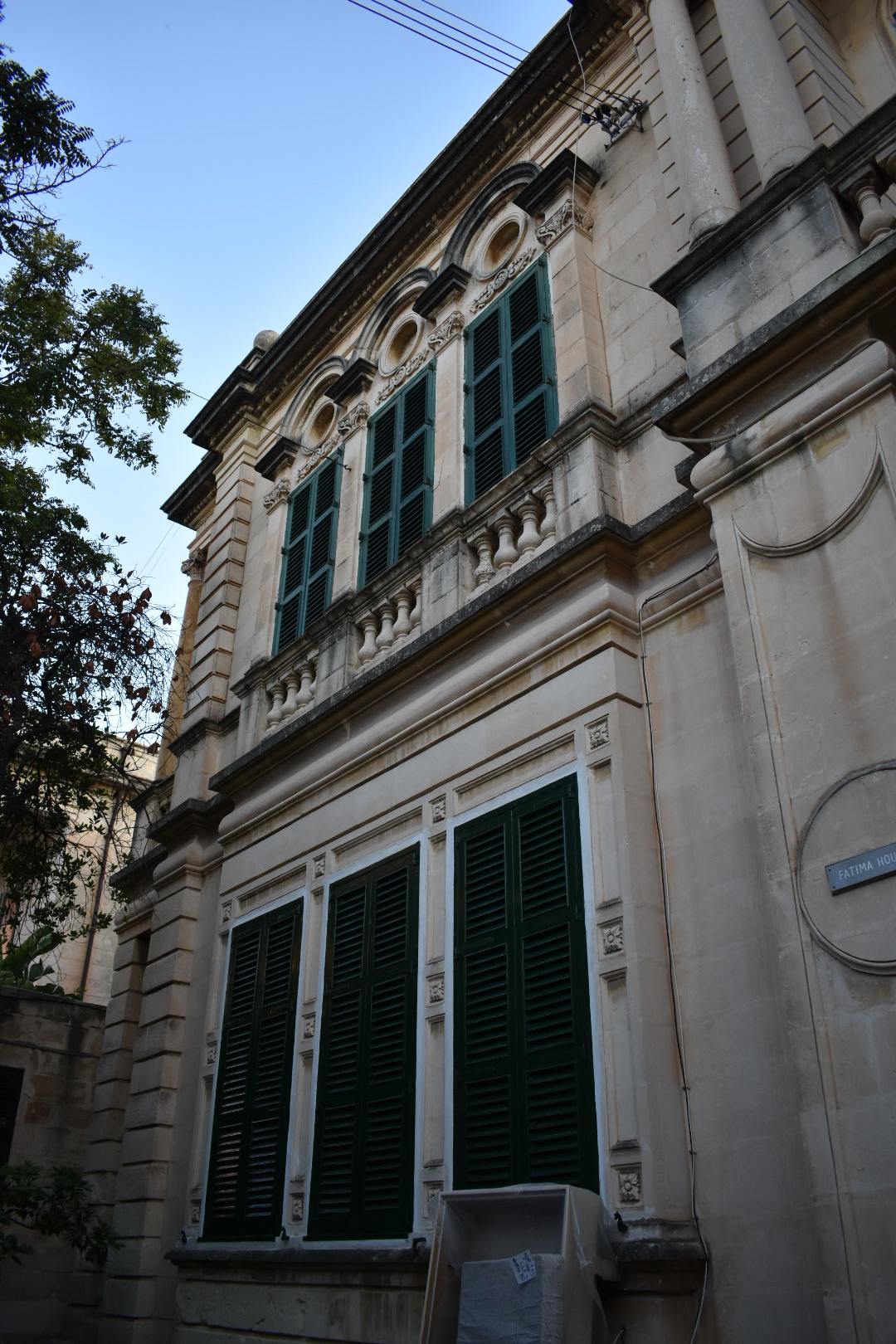
Façade details by Zammit

The ground of the building became in possession of Philanthropist Sir Alfonso Maria Galea (Maltese: is-Sur Fons Marija Galea) in the early 19th century and, through his decision to erect a building, it set a domino effect for a growing community in the area. Galea appointed leading Architect Francesco Zammit to design a villa, who had an eye for details, expectations for the clients and architectural context. Zammit used a mix of contemporal and British period design, and the final design is of Palladian architecture. He also designed the next door Villino Zammit to similar architecture design. Zammit and Alfonso were close relatives of the same family.

The residence was completed by 1895, and was originally named Villa Betharram, and at some point renamed as Villa Rathnapoora. It was used as a residence for Galea himself. Galea was a prominent person and had close connection with the Roman Catholic Church who often corresponded with the higher hierarchy of the religion and gave generous donations.

In 1942 the nearby matrice parish Church of Stella Maris was severely damaged by an aerial raid during World War II, and the Galea family opened their house as an alternative place for worship during and after the war, until the parish church opened to the public again.

The daughter of Galea, Mary Xavier, became a Catholic nun and at this point the family donated the Villa to the White Sister, the same Catholic organization which Mary joined. The short-lived religious organization was founded in 1957, when the house was transferred from the family to the church, and became defunct by 1960.

The donation of the property received a prominent coverage by the Times of Malta on 19 September 1957, when passed to the sisters, and was described as a stately home due to being one of the largest residences in Sliema. The main scope of donating the property was to serve as an ideal place for newly ordained sisters to further their studies for their vocation and as a residence. The family received praise by being named for their gesture. The newspaper said that:

The stately home 'Betharram' in High street
Sliema, formerly the residence of Mr and Mrs A M
Galea has been taken over by the White Sisters
to serve as a study house for the Congregation
in Malta.

The residence changed purpose by 1960, when it was handed to the Sisters of St Dorothy who converted it to a homeless shelter. The initiative was encouraged and pushed forward by the Bishop of Malta Mikiel Gonzi, in order to keep assisting in later stages girls who when younger were already assisted in the institutions of the church.

As a startup the home accepted the help and initiatives of two American aid organizations; the C.R.S. and the American Relief Association (C.A.R.E.). The organizations accepted donation from the American and Maltese people in the form of items and food, who later distributed them accordingly. About a year later on 29 January 1961, when the house had already received clients, it was officially inaugurated by Lady Granthem, the wife of the Government of Malta Sir Guy Grantham, followed by the blessing of Bishop Gonzi. The number of girls given residence increased from two in 1960 to fifteen in 1965.

The conversion proved to be successful and the shelter for minors and youth females remained a supporting ground leading for an eventual independent living. The house was then handed to the Sister of St Joseph in 1965, when Provincial Sister Victoria Ramsey accepted to administer the home. The Sisters of St Joseph ran the hostel for four and a half decades, until the lack of vocations saw the need to transfer the hostel to another Catholic organization. It was then trusted to the Ursuline Sisters in 2009 or 2010.

Since 1960, Fatima House remains the most common name used to refer to the building. On this point, the nunnery have also referred to the home, building or both as the Fatima Hostel or Fatima Working Girls' House. Thus, the building is used both as a residence for some of the Ursuline nuns and as a homeless shelter for young women. Clients are over 16 years and under 26 years to be accepted as residents. They generally may stay not longer after they are 30 years of age.

Throughout the years, since becoming a homelessness shelter, the house has received funding from the local government, sponsorship or voluntarily work by private firms, and several means of donations by groups and individuals of different backgrounds. The home has also been the subject for studies related to social work in Malta in areas of involving children, poverty, homelessness and empowerment for women. It has been observed that among the needs of the clients of the house, before moving to independent living, is to help them deal with emotional feelings caused due their difficult childhood. Along the years, the home was aided by a number of volunteers, with continuous request for. The Ursulines operate a website for necessarily contact solely for the purpose of the home.

A restoration permission was requested from the Planning Authority by the Superior Nun Elonora Chetcuti in March 2019, and was given the go ahead in September 2019.

In August 2025, an agreement was signed between the Ministry for Social Policy and Children's Rights and the foundation known locally as Fondazzjoni Sebħ so that the latter could run the house for similar purposes.

== Architecture and gardens ==
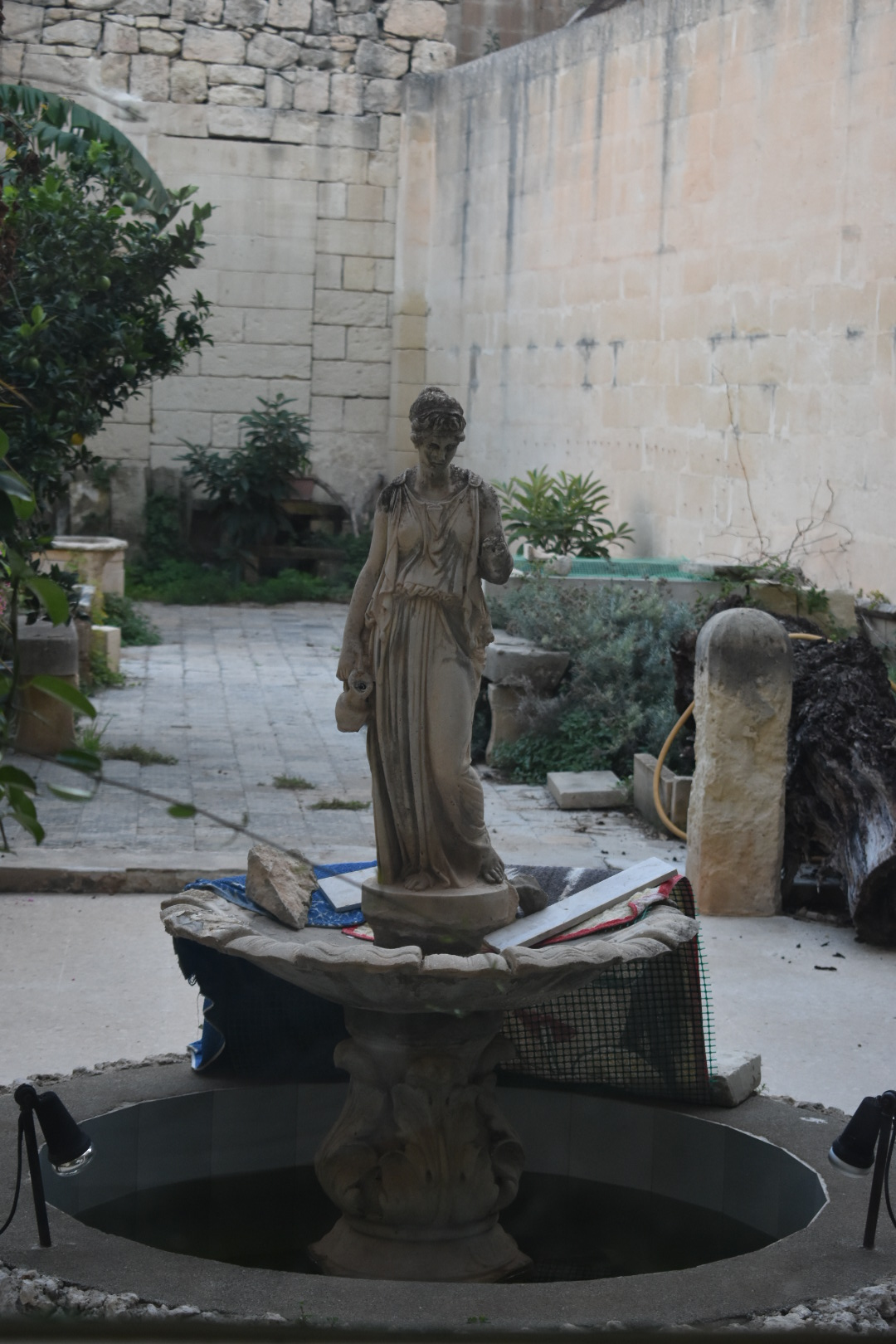
Fountain at the back garden

Fatima House is a two-story building and Architect Zammit designed it with a detached outline from other buildings. The Palladian architecture and imposing four-sides façades are unusual to Sliema. The latter are characterized by massive columns on each side terrace and a prominent portico above the main door at the first floor. The building is elevated, is two storey high, and similar to most buildings in Malta has a flat roof. Its architecture is a fine example of secular family homes of the period, but has now become useful for the religious duty of helping the homeless.

Similar to Villino Zammit, the Malta Environment and Planning Authority has scheduled Fatima House as a Grade II listed building.

The stately home is considered as one of the finest buildings in Sliema, one of the best example of historic architectural styles, and among the most preserved buildings in the area in their original state.

The interior of the villa is divided with the groundfloor being used for the more common living purposes and seldom open to the public, and the upper floor used privately by the residents which includes a dormitory.

A chapel is also hosted into the building with active attendance for worship.

The villa is surrounded by native Maltese gardens in front, sides and at the back. Some of the garden are visible to the public from the street while the back garden is more private but over time became overshadowed by modern housing developments. The front garden features a niche of the Madonna of Lourdes. The main attraction in the back garden is a period fountain surmounted by a statue of a secular lady.

== See also ==
- Villa Bonici
- The Green House
- 33, Cathedral Street

== Bibliography ==
- Guillaumier, Alfie (2005). Pawlu Mizzi (ed.). Bliet u Rħula Maltin (in Maltese). Vol. 2 (5 ed.). Gudja: Klabb Kotba Maltin. p. 827. ISBN 99932-39-40-2.
