= Wild Bird Society of Japan =

Organisation in Japan

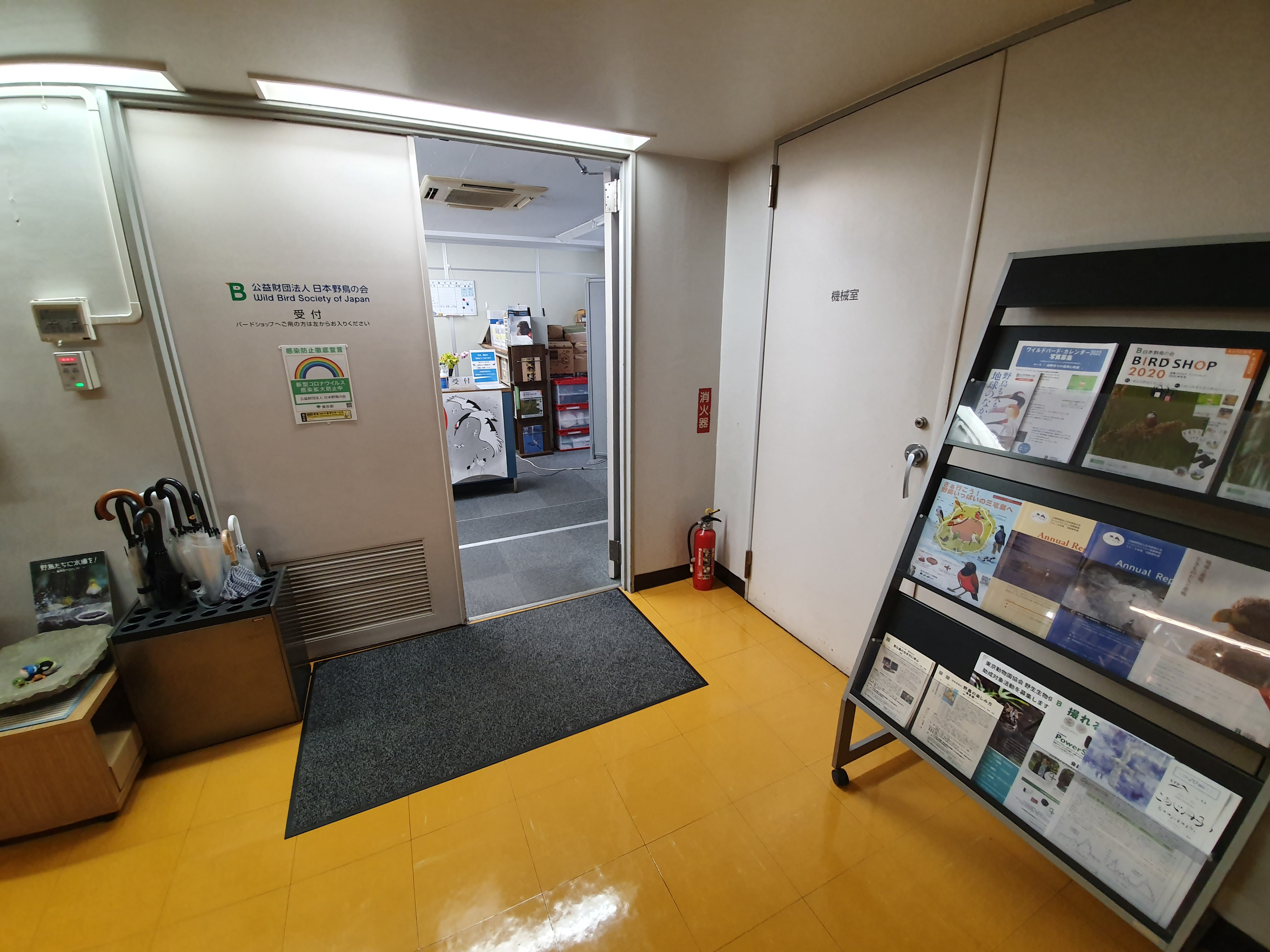
Wild Bird Society of Japan in Tokyo

The Wild Bird Society of Japan (Japanese: 日本野鳥の会, romanized: Nihon'yachōnokai) was founded in 1934 in Tokyo, Japan. The organisation has 47,000 members and publishes a newsletter called Strix. Other relevant publications include the Field Guide to the Birds of Japan, Birds of East Asia, and A Birdwatchers's Guide to Japan by Mark Brazil (published by Kodansha).

After 15 years of lobbying by WBSJ and numerous other conservation organisations, the Hokkaido Government chose not to build drainage channels along the Chitose River in Chitose, Hokkaidō. Lobbying by WBSJ and others, were also successful in getting the plan to reclaim Fujimae Tidal Flat, an important migration stop-over site for shorebirds, to be dropped.

Wild Bird Society of Japan (WBSJ) is a BirdLife International Partner. Princess Takamado is the honorary president of BirdLife International.

== International activities ==
Wild Bird Society of Japan is engaged in a number of international partnerships and campaigns.

In conjunction with Taiwan Wild Bird Federation (previously BirdLife in Taiwan), Hong Kong Bird Watching Society (BirdLife in Hong Kong) and other organisations, a joint-project sponsored by JFGE and the Council of Agriculture of Taiwan (COA), successfully tracked black-faced spoonbills to previously unknown nesting sites in the Demilitarized Zone in Korea, and also identified several new important stopover sites in China.

WBSJ worked with the Heilongjiang Farm Bureau to design nature reserves at the Sanjiang Plain in China, sponsored by the Japan Bank for International Cooperation (JBIC).

In conjunction with Wetlands International, the organisation worked to promote the Asia-Pacific Migratory Waterbird Conservation Strategy.

WBSJ also funded and supported the opening of an education centre at Muraviovka Nature Park, Russia.

Japan and Australia also shared lead roles in the promotion of international bird conservation links, for example, the Japan Australia Migratory Bird Agreement (JAMBA) treaty which came into force in 1981.
