= Bird trapping =

Methods of capturing wild birds

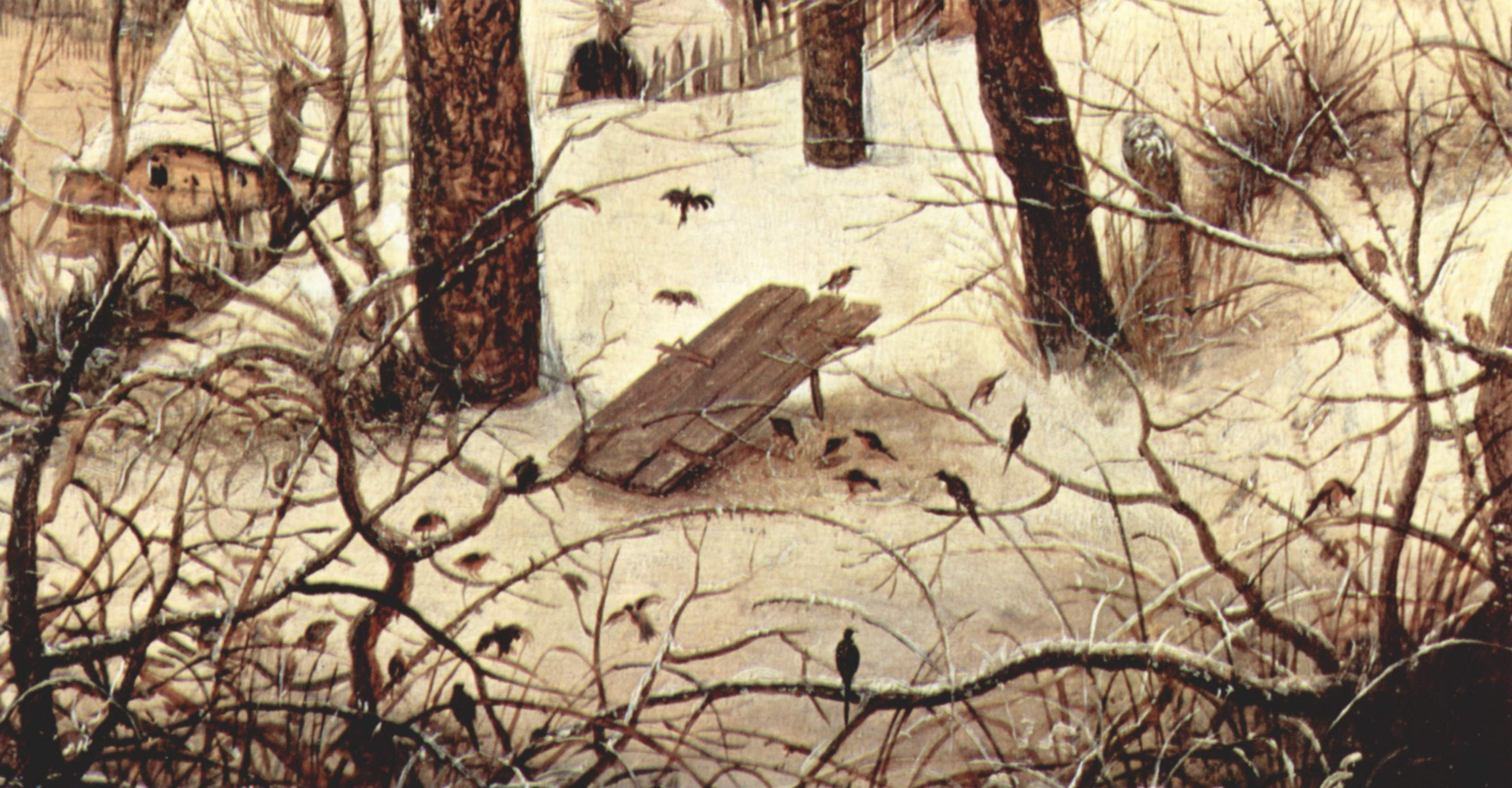
Painting of a lethal deadfall trap, a detail of Bruegel's 1565 Winter Landscape with Ice skaters and Bird trap

Bird trapping techniques to capture wild birds include a wide range of techniques that have their origins in the hunting of birds for food. While hunting for food does not require birds to be caught alive, some trapping techniques capture birds without harming them and are of use in ornithology research. Wild birds may also be trapped for their display in captivity in zoological gardens or for keeping as a pet. Bird trapping was formerly unregulated, but to protect bird populations most countries have specific laws and regulations.

== Luring ==
Birds are lured into the vicinity of traps through the use of suitable habitat patches where the birds are known to visit. A specific location may be further modified by the provision of food, the use of decoy birds, the use of calls, or owls that may induce mobbing. Male birds of some species are used as decoys during the breeding season to challenge and beckon other males from nearby. Larks were formerly attracted using a rotary paddle, sometimes with shiny mirrors attached, turned by a spring. The phrase "a mirror for larks" was once a common metaphor for a trap. Owls and their calls are often used to bring birds out of dense vegetation. The technique has also been used by birdwatchers.

== Trapping techniques ==
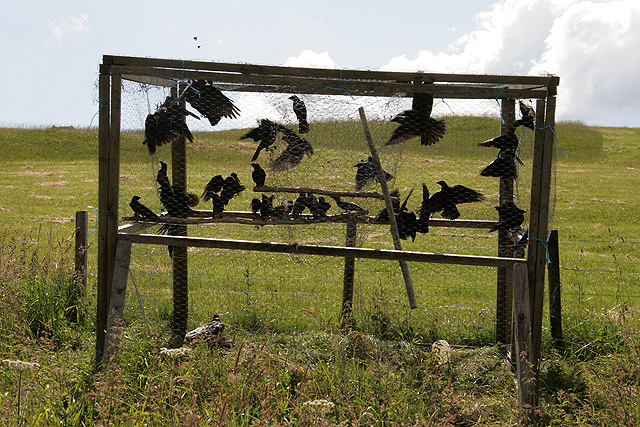
Crows in a trap on a farm in England

Almost all traps involve the use of food, water or decoys to attract birds within range and a mechanism for restricting the movement, injuring or killing birds that come into range. Food, water, decoy birds and call playback may be used to bring birds to the trap. The use of chemical sprays on crops or food can have more widespread effects and are not usually included in trapping techniques although there are some capture techniques that make use of bait with stupefying agents. The mechanism can be physical and non-lethal like a noose that tightens around the leg or lethal like in deadfall traps. Lethal techniques have been used for the control of birds considered as pests or can be used in the capture of birds for food. Traps can vary in their design to capture individual birds or large flocks and are adapted according to the habitat and behaviour of the birds. Trapping is regulated in most countries and needs to be operated by trained research personnel and failure to follow precautions can lead to injury or death of birds.

=== Trap door traps ===
Introduced in 2011, trap door traps are humane box traps with a spring-loaded lid and feeding platform. The trap attracts target birds to feed and is triggered when the bird steps on a perch. The trap then drops the bird via gravity into a quiet, comfortable space until they are ready for live removal and relocation. There is no stress to the bird – no part of the trap makes contact nor does a human touch. These traps offer flexibility in bait and attraction techniques, can be outfitted with an internal catch bag for bird removal, and some include a means to send a notification to a phone or remote operator that a bird has been captured. Trap door traps are most often used for relocating small birds that have entered public buildings and structures such as warehouses, atriums and airport terminals.

=== Clap traps ===
Clap traps are spring-loaded frames with netting that are set up in two parts that come together rapidly when triggered by birds or manually controlled to enclose birds. They are usually used for ground birds but some variants are used in shallow water for the capture of waterfowl. Clap traps may be placed at a location habitually used by birds or can include luring devices.

=== Funnel traps/corral traps ===
Funnel traps have a narrow entrance into which birds may be lured or driven and the entrance typically leads to larger holding pen or corral (which also gives them the name of corral trap). Funnel traps can be very large and a particularly well-known large scale form was devised in the German bird observatory at Heligoland and are termed as a Heligoland trap.

=== Cannon nets ===
Flocking birds are sometimes trapped using a large net which is thrown using a series of synchronized cannons or rockets that shoot a weight that drags a net behind it over the entire flock. These nets are also called rocket nets or boom nets. Capturing entire flocks can be an important tool for studies where large numbers of birds need to be examined (such as when monitoring for viruses) or when the birds are gregarious and social. These techniques are used especially in open habitats and are particularly suited for waders and waterbirds. After examination, ringing or other operations, the captured birds are usually released together rather than individually.

=== Mist nets ===
Mist nets are fine nets that are suitable for capturing birds in woodlands. The fine net is strung across trees so as to lie in the flight path of a bird. A bird flies into the nearly invisible net and falls to a fold at the bottom of the net where it usually gets entangled. These nets are used especially in bird ringing and are typically never left unsupervised. A bird that falls is quickly removed to avoid injury to the bird and to prevent it from falling prey to predators.

=== Noose traps ===
Birds that walk on the ground can be captured using an array of mono-filament nooses. These are usually placed along favoured feeding, roosting or nest sites. Some raptors are trapped using live-bait and nooses on the cage holding the bait. This trap, also known as a bal-chatri, has also been adapted to capture other birds such as shrikes. A "noose carpet" is another variant that consists of a number of tiny nooses on a mat.

=== Birdlime ===
The muscles of perching birds allow the toes to pull inwards with some force but there are no strong muscles to open them up. The application of sticky latex, "birdlime", often obtained from a local tree to favourite perches is used in many parts of the world to capture small birds. Other variations include the use of a long stick daubed with birdlime that is manually placed over the bird to cause its wings to get stuck. The sale and use of birdlime is illegal in many jurisdictions, but its use was widespread in older times.

=== Spot-light trapping ===
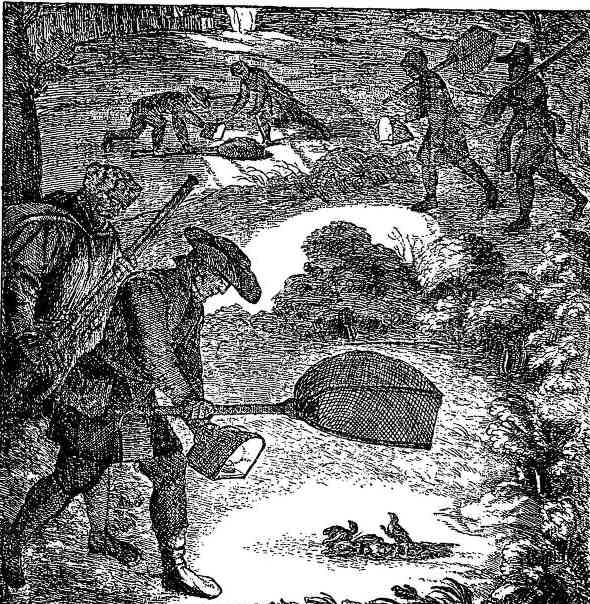
Netting larks at night with a lantern

Some birds such as partridges and pheasants can be caught in the night by stunning them with bright light beams. Before the 19th Century, lanterns were used for hunting larks at night in Spain, Italy and England. In Italy the technique was known as lanciatoia and in England it was referred to as bat-fowling or low belling.

== Other methods used in control and hunting ==
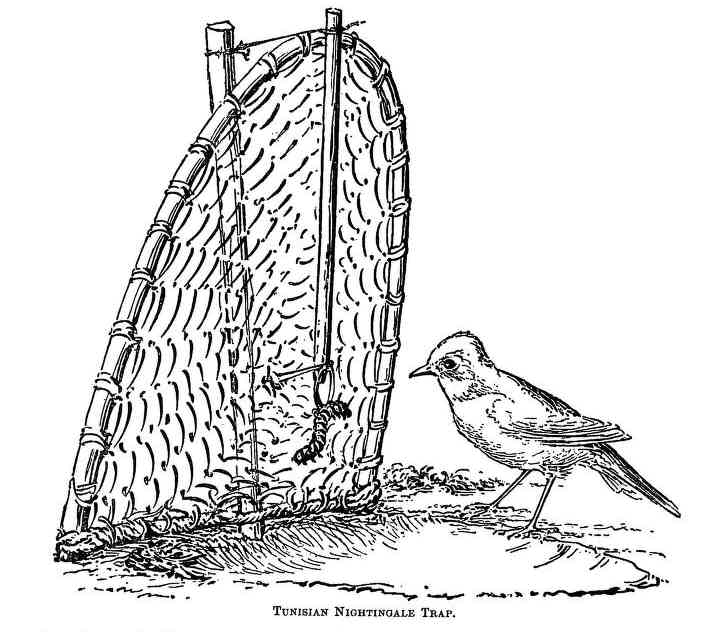
A baited trap

A number of lethal techniques have been described for the killing of birds. Dead-fall traps, consisting of heavy slabs or branches, that fall onto the targets when they trigger it from below have been described from early times. A painting of such a trap for killing crows was made by Pieter Bruegel the Elder in 1565. Birds are particularly vulnerable at their nest and a variety of methods to capture nesting birds exist around the world. In 2005, after a 100-year-long prohibition, the French government permitted the reintroduction of the use of stone traps ("tendelles") in the Départements Lozère and Aveyron. Around the Mediterranean birds are caught in France, Italy, Spain, Greece, Cyprus, Malta and other countries by traps specifically during the migratory seasons when birds travel between Europe and Africa and back. In many countries trapping of wild birds is illegal and thus represents poaching. Cyprus is a stepping stone in the eastern European-African flyway. Although illegal for decades bird trapping is a black market enterprise with a profitable sale of birds to restaurants that cater to their patrons serving ambelopoulia. The spring 2010 led to the killing of over a quarter million of birds in Cyprus. Some birds with weak flight can be captured by chasing them. In India waterfowl were once captured by hunters who walked underwater with an earthen pot over their head. By walking up to floating ducks they could grab the legs of the duck. Empty pots were floated for a few days to make the birds accustomed to them.

== Restraint and handling of trapped birds ==
=== Waterfowl and long billed birds ===
Ducks, geese and other water birds can use their wings and bills to batter handlers and inflict potentially significant injuries. Loons, grebes and herons have long, sharp beaks, with which they may stab the face of a handler. One technique employed for restraint of a captured waterfowl is to grasp the base of the neck and hold the wings back and immobile.

=== Shore birds and gulls ===
Upon extraction from the net, a restraint technique utilized in the case of small birds is to hold them around the body, with the fingers at the back of the head. While shore birds are not aggressive, their sharp beaks may be hazardous to handlers.

=== Raptors ===
Raptors are adapted carnivores; their talons and beaks are designed to rend flesh from prey. Thus – in order to avoid injury – handlers may employ mitigating techniques, such as wearing heavy leather gloves when handling raptors. While this measure provides protection, this may be impeded by a raptor's beak and talons piercing through the protective equipment. Additionally, a falconer's hood may be utilized for the reduction of stress on the bird, while a tether at the metatarsi could bind the bird to a perch or block.

There are several manners in which raptors are captured. This may occur through throwing a towel over the target, followed by wrapping it in the towel. Another method is to manually restrain the body and wings of the bird. Specifics of the approach are determined by the use case. In the case of a specific defensive posture occurring in owls, characterized by them lying on their back and flailing at a handler with their talons, an approach used by handlers is to provide a towel for the owl to claw at, resulting in a situation in which its legs can be secured. Medium-sized raptors can also be restrained by a set of nylon hose for long periods of time.

=== Flightless birds ===
In order to avoid the risk posed by a penguin's beak, a technique for capturing them may consist of grasping them at the base of the head from behind. Another way to capture large penguins is to cover them in a trash can with a hole in the bottom.

Large ostriches, emus, and cassowaries have pecking beaks and long legs used to kick. The cassowary in particular has a large claw on one toe that can inflict serious lacerations and punctures, or even disembowelment. While handling of emus can occur through a straddling technique, the physical handling of ostriches and cassowaries requires moving them to a smaller enclosure. Other restraint techniques include lowering and directing the head of the ostrich, which is said to discourage an ostrich from kicking forward. For the handling of cassowaries without harm to a handler, a favored technique aimed at enclosure is the utilization of a large wooden shield. This technique is also applicable to ostriches.

== Laws ==
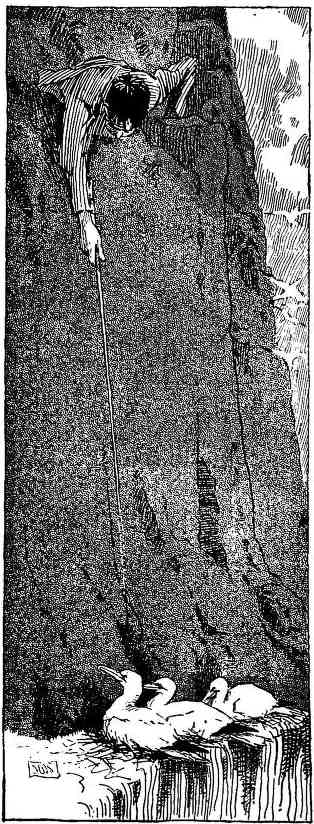
Capturing gannets with a noose

Most countries have laws prohibiting the use of traps for capturing birds. Professional bird trapping may be regulated by licenses and researchers requiring to trap birds will usually need to obtain permissions. Hunting to some extent may however be allowed and some birds may be exempted. Traps may thus be used under some circumstances such as in the control of birds considered as pests. Some international treaties aim to protect migratory species across national boundaries. Some organizations work to protect birds from trappers. Several organizations have emerged to identify and remove traps and help authorities. Among the volunteer organizations are Lega per l´Abolizione della Caccia (League for the Abolition of Hunting), Centro Soccorso Animali Modena (CSA) Modena (Fauna Rescue Centre Modena), World Wide Fund for Nature (WWF Italia), and LIPU (Lega Italiana Protezione Uccelli or Italian League for Bird Protection, Naples) One volunteer organization removed 150,000 illegal traps during a ten-year span.

In Europe, the 1979 Birds Directive and its amendments seeks to protect wild birds and allows hunting only within certain limits. According to the Directive use of traps, bird lime (glue), nets, live decoys and poison is forbidden at all times and birds are protected during breeding and spring migration. Malta joined the European Union in 2004 and obtained certain exemptions from the protective laws that apply to the membership states regarding wild birds. Trapping of several types of finches was allowed for five years until 2009 when the derogation was phased out. Malta had about 4,700 licensed trappers in 2007 who, by exemption from European protective laws, continue to trap quail, turtle doves, golden plovers and song thrushes. Further, illegal trapping continues to be a problem in Malta. In North America the Migratory Bird Treaty Act of 1918 and its amendments protect wild birds.

== Ecological impact ==
Trapping can devastate local bird populations and also impact migrants at critical stopover sites. In Malta, three local species have been extirpated by trappers and hunters—the peregrine falcon, the barn owl and the jackdaw. Jonathan Franzen has called Malta "the most savagely bird-hostile place in Europe". Trapping also affects migratory birds at important stopover sites such as the Maltese islands. However, one book claims that peregrine falcons have again started to breed successfully since 2009 in Malta and that the main hunting organisation openly speaks against illegal hunting and trapping. The author also suggests that claims by Birdlife are often exaggerated.

A study of prehistoric kitchen middens suggests that hunting by humans may have contributed to the extinction of several bird species.
