= Bat-fowling =

Archaic method to catch birds at night

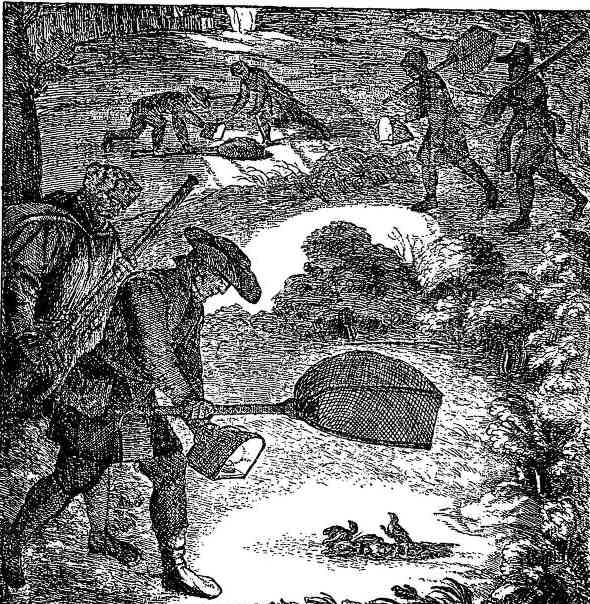
Hunting birds by night

Bat-fowling is an archaic method of catching birds at night, while they are at roost. The process involves lighting straw or torches near their roost. After awakening them from their roost, the birds fly toward the flames, where, being amazed, they are easily caught in nets, or beaten with bats. The phrase "beating about the bush" is said to be derived from this practice as the trapper's accomplices would go around the bushes to disturb the birds. The practice was also called lanciatoia in Italy and a variation was called low-belling. The low-belling process involves approaching birds with bright lights and using cow bells, which the birds were accustomed to, to approach the birds up close and capture them with a long-handled net.
