= BirdLife Malta =

Maltese wildlife conservation organization

- Formation: January 25, 1962; 64 years ago
- Type: NGO
- Main organ: BirdLife International
- Website: birdlifemalta.org
- Formerly called: Malta Ornithological Society

BirdLife Malta is Malta's biggest environmental movement. The organization's stated aim is to "achieve protection of wild birds, natural habitat and biodiversity".

BirdLife Malta is also Malta's first environmental NGO. It was founded in January 1962, and was then known as MOS (Malta Ornithological Society). It started off more as a study group, but quickly came to realize that wild birds were in dire need of protection. Today, Birdlife Malta works to protect bird populations.

Malta is a very densely populated small Mediterranean island state, with no truly wild areas left. The biggest threats to birds in Malta are habitat destruction (e.g. new roads, building development, hotels, golf courses), disturbance and direct persecution (hunting, trapping). Malta has been called "the most savagely bird-hostile place in Europe".

BirdLife Malta uses various methods to protect birds. Foremost among its methods are education, especially through schools campaigns, publications, the media and an active junior member section; the management of two wetland nature reserves, namely Għadira and Is-Simar; lobbying the authorities for better bird-protection legislation; assisting the police for better law enforcement; reclaiming and improving degraded habitat; and doing research about birds and their habitat to identify more areas for protection.

BirdLife Malta issues various newsletters and magazines for its membership, and publishes books about natural history. Its latest book is Nature in Gozo (2007).

BirdLife Malta is an entirely voluntary organisation and dependent on subscription and donations. Membership currently stands at about 3000.

BirdLife Malta is a Partner of BirdLife International, a global network of environmental organizations in 100 countries and territories.

Causes of Population Decline:

Hunting and illegal poaching of birds, especially larger predatory birds can have a significant impact on their population size and has resulted in some population decline.[3] Recently the Maltese government agreed to allow the shooting of 5,000 Turtle Doves. This created controversy due to the endangered status of these birds. BirdLife Malta works to prevent the illegal hunting of birds and works to maintain Malta as a safe stop for the many migratory bird species that pass through on an annual bases.

== See also ==
- List of environmental organizations
