= Taiwan Wild Bird Federation =

Taiwanese bird conservation organization

- 中華民國野鳥學會
- Abbreviation: TWBF
- Formation: July 31, 1988; 38 years ago
- Type: NGO
- Purpose: Conservation
- Location: Taipei, Taiwan
- Region served: Taiwan
- Members: 4000
- President: Tsai Shih-peng
- Website: www.bird.org.tw
- Formerly called: Chinese Wild Bird Federation

The Taiwan Wild Bird Federation (Chinese: 中華民國野鳥學會; pinyin: Zhōnghuá mínguó yěniǎo xuéhuì) or TWBF is Taiwan's largest bird conservation organization and represents 21 groups throughout Taiwan and its outlying islands.

The official TWBF bird as well as the bird depicted on the logo is the Mikado pheasant, a species endemic to the mountainous regions of Taiwan.

== History ==
- 1988: Wild Bird Society of the Republic of China was established in Taiwan by a group of wild bird enthusiasts.
- 1994: became a Partner Designate of BirdLife International.
- 1996: became an Official Partner of BirdLife International.
- 2001: the English name was renamed to Wild Bird Federation Taiwan.
- 2008: the English name was renamed to Chinese Wild Bird Federation due to repeated pressure from People's Republic of China to BirdLife International
- 2020: on 7 September 2020 CWBF was voted out of BirdLife International due to pressure from People's Republic of China. The English name was subsequently renamed to Taiwan Wild Bird Federation on 19 September 2020 "to avoid international confusion and allow us to expand ties with other groups in promoting the important work of global conservation."

== Mission ==
The purpose of TWBF is to protect wild birds and its natural habitats through appreciation, research and conservation.

== Programs ==
TWBF conducts bird population surveys and migration research in conjunction with local and international organizations.

- Checklist of the Birds of Taiwan (Chinese: 台灣鳥類名錄), updated every three years. The publication is the most comprehensive checklist of birds found in Taiwan and covers all land areas under Taiwan's administration, including outlying islands.
- Black-faced Spoonbill Global Census (Chinese: 黑面琵鷺全球同步普查) is a simultaneous survey of black-faced spoonbill's wintering population initiated by the Hong Kong Bird Watching Society in coordination with bird societies in the region including South Korea, Japan, China, Macau, Thailand, Cambodia, and Taiwan.
- Taiwan Bird Banding Program (Chinese: 野鳥繫放腳環管理) is administered by TWBF and provides management and support of bird ringing in Taiwan for academia and citizen research groups.

TWBF organizes several citizen science projects including the following.

- Taiwan New Year Bird Count (Chinese: 臺灣新年數鳥嘉年華), an annual community bird count to record wintering birds in Taiwan and its outlying islands.
- eBird Taiwan, administered jointly by TWBF and Taiwan's Biodiversity Research Institute.

The group publishes Feather, a quarterly bilingual online magazine on bird-related issues.

== Organization ==
TWBF is composed of 18 local bird associations and 3 ecology conservation groups.

=== Local Bird Associations ===
- Kaohsiung Wild Bird Society
- Wild Bird Association of Taiwan
- Wild Bird Society of Chang Hwa
- Wild Bird Society of Chia-Yi County
- Wild Bird Society of Chiayi
- Wild Bird Society of Hsinchu
- Wild Bird Society of Hualien
- Wild Bird Society of I-Lan
- Wild Bird Society of Keelung
- Wild Bird Society of Kinmen
- Wild Bird Society of Matsu
- Wild Bird Society of Nantou County
- Wild Bird Society of Ping-tung
- Wild Bird Society of Tainan
- Wild Bird Society of Taipei
- Wild Bird Society of Taitung County
- Wild Bird Society of Taoyuan
- Wild Bird Society of Yun-Lin

=== Ecology Groups ===
- Kaohsiung Jiading Ecology and Cultural Association
- Meinung People's Association
- Miaoli Nature Ecology Society
