= Villa Bonici =

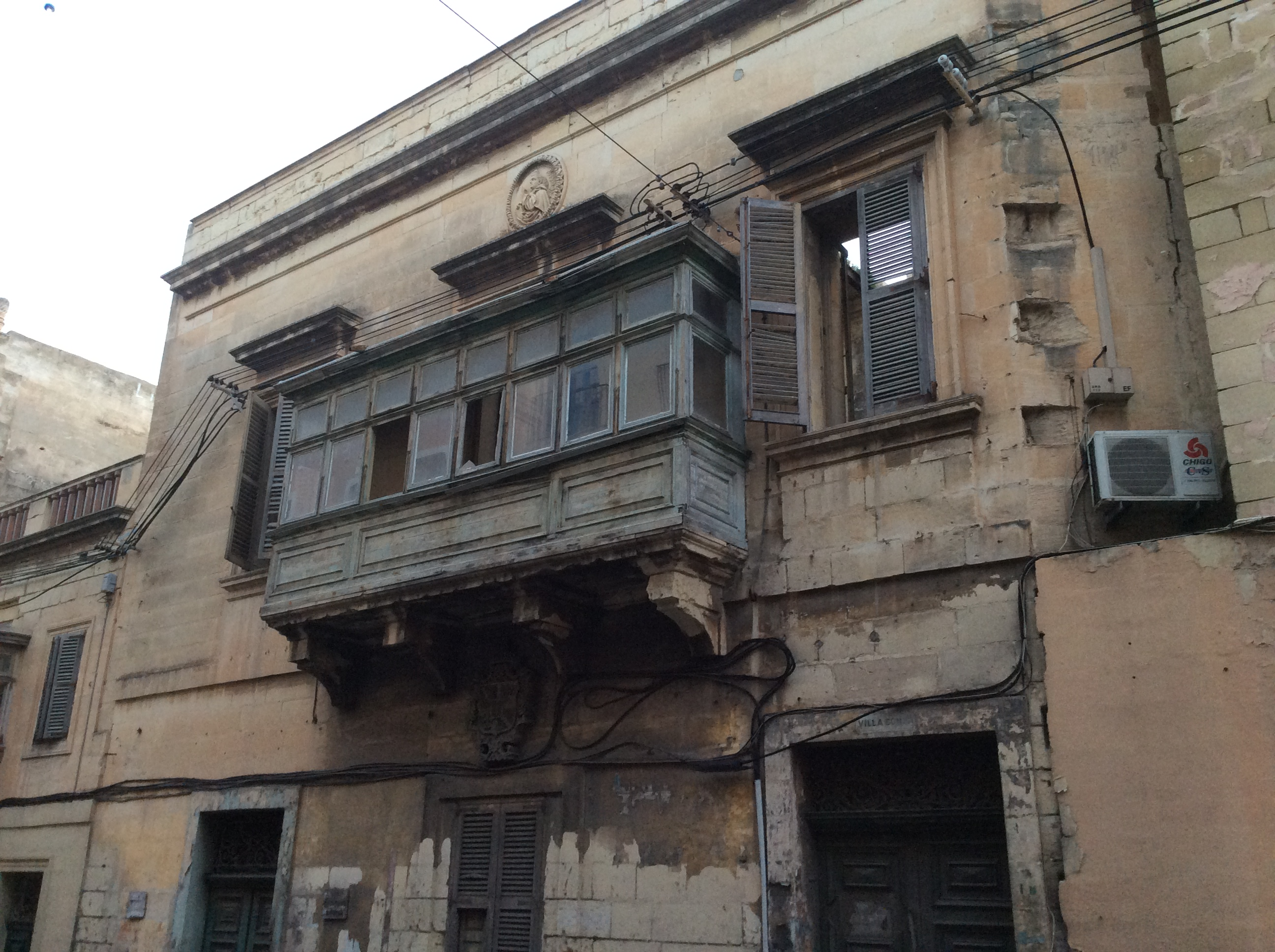
- Villa Bonici in a dilapidated state; above balcony figure representing Emanuel Testaferrata Bonici Ghaxaq
- Interactive map of the Villa Bonici area

General information
- Status: Intact
- Type: Villa
- Architectural style: Baroque
- Location: Sliema, Malta
- Coordinates: 35°54′34.6″N 14°29′58.3″E
- Current tenants: Alfred Gera de Petri
- Named for: Bonici family
- Completed: 1872

Technical details
- Material: Limestone

Villa Bonici is a baroque 19th century villa in Sliema, Malta. It was built by Marquis Emanuel Testaferrata Bonici Ghaxaq (Asciak) as a country residence.

== History ==
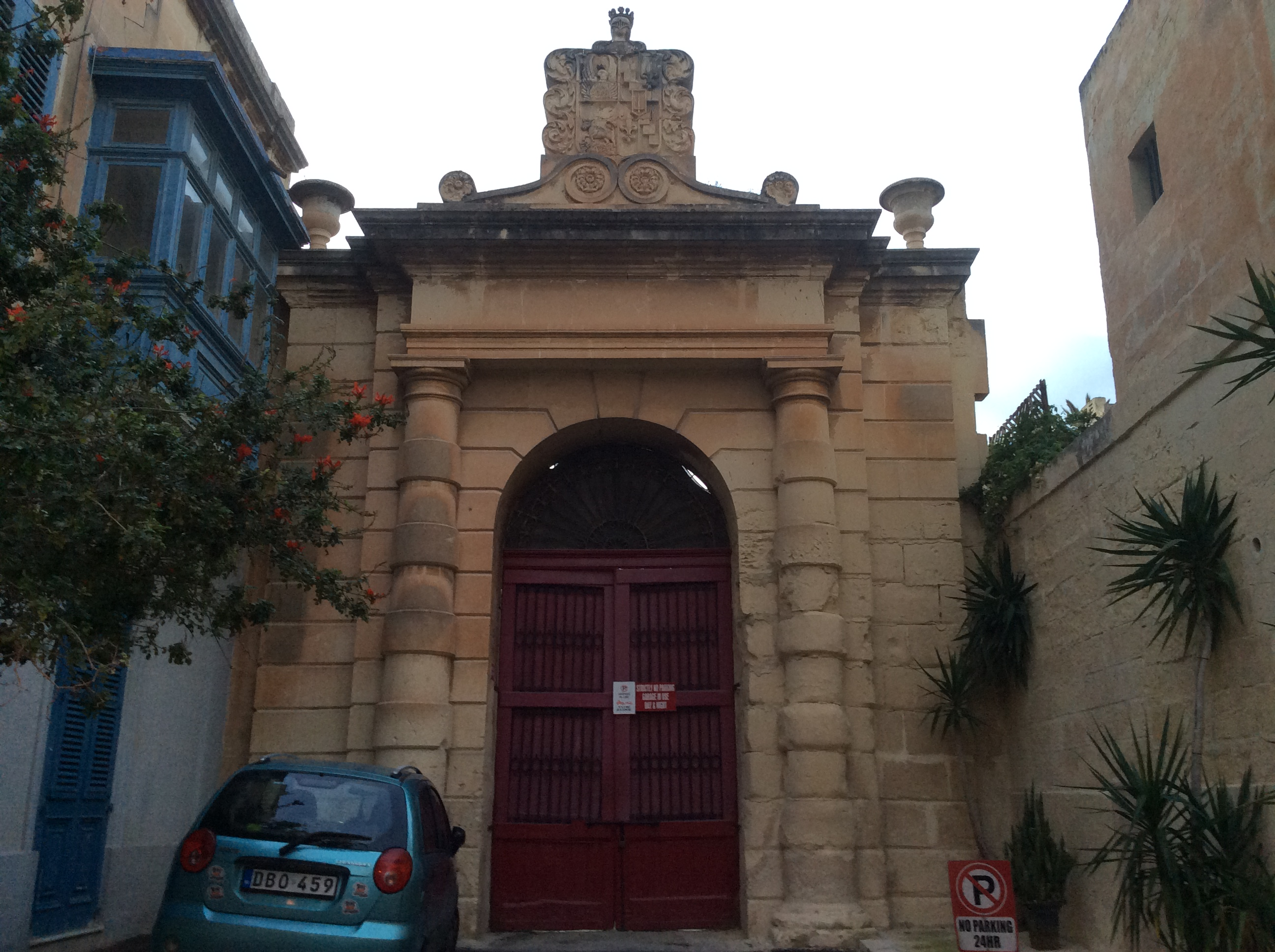
Villa Bonici Arch

Villa Bonici is a large building that was built in the 19th century, some time before 1872, as a countryside house by aristocrat Marquis Baron Emanuele Testaferrata Bonici Ghaxaq (Asciak). The villa has passed to his next generations of his family: first to Lino Testaferrata Bonici, then to Agnes Gera de Petri, and then to Alfred Gera de Petri. Apart from the building of the villa the property has a separate farmhouse and the terraced gardens for what it is well known, making it unique in the overdeveloped areas of Gzira and Sliema. Originally the gardens were surrounded by a wall made of several arches. The garden used to extend to the seaside, but this side was developed with modern buildings.

== Modern ==
The villa had previously served as one of the few open air cinema theatres in Malta. It also served as a school until 1969 and became an educational institute again as part of the St. Louis School. Today Villa Bonici is in a dilapidated state. It is surrounded by modern building development and had become an issue of development itself by its owners as being a high potential economic asset.

== Maltese heritage ==
The historic parts of Villa Bonici were scheduled as a Grade 2 by the Malta Environment and Planning Authority (MEPA) in 2010.

== Garden ==
17th and 18th century fragments were found within the gardens of the villa. It is unclear whether these are indication of earlier habitation of the grounds or dumped material from Valletta during the period of the rule of the Order of St John.

The villa has one baroque archway designed for its large gardens. Other arches at the waterfront were demolished to build up the open air cinema. The cinema was converted into a commercial outlet. This building was eventually demolished to make way for a block of apartments. Most of the gardens are still intact but are subject to development.

== See also ==
- The Green House, Sliema
- 33, Cathedral Street
- Fatima House
