= Flimkien għal Ambjent Aħjar =

Maltese non-profit organization

Flimkien għal Ambjent Aħjar (FAA) is a Maltese non-profit, non-governmental organisation, committed to preserving Malta and Gozo's architectural and rural heritage as well as ensuring a healthy quality of life. It lobbies for the better preservation and use of the heritage of the Maltese islands, not only for the sake of preservation but also as an agent of social regeneration in areas such as lower Valletta, the Three Cities and the smaller sister island of Gozo. Its name is abbreviated in the local press as FAA. Its motto is "together for a better environment."

== History and role ==
Set up in 2006, FAA has established a track record in saving sites for future generations, beginning with the Tal-Papa farm, an oasis of rare endemic plants and protected fauna dating back to the 16th century, the Palazz ta' Rohan at Balzan, Ta' Ħaġrat Temples at Mġarr, Villa Bologna in Attard, the Art Deco House and Villa Bonici in Sliema, as well as two stately residences in Ghaxaq. FAA's campaigning has saved streetscapes and public facilities in the villages and towns of Mellieħa, Sliema and Marsaskala as well as protecting a watercourse in Mellieħa and virgin land in Żebbuġ, Marsalforn, Qala Valley and the Ramla l-Ħamra hillside from being built up.
