= List of monuments in Sliema =

This is a list of monuments in Sliema, Malta, which are listed on the National Inventory of the Cultural Property of the Maltese Islands.

== List ==
Name of object	Location	Coordinates	ID	Photo	Upload
Stella Maris Parish Church	Triq il-Kbira	35°54′43″N 14°30′15″E	00019	Stella Maris Parish Church	Upload Photo
Sacro Cuor Parish Church	Triq San Trofimu	35°54′38″N 14°30′03″E	00020	Sacro Cuor Parish Church	Upload Photo
Niche of St. Anthony	101 Triq San Ġwann Battista	35°54′33″N 14°30′00″E	00727	Niche of St. Anthony	Upload Photo
Statue of St. John the Baptist	30 Triq Sant'Agata	35°54′32″N 14°29′59″E	00728	Statue of St. John the Baptist	Upload Photo
Niche of the Madonna	The Green House, 1 Triq Sant'Agata	35°54′32″N 14°30′04″E	00729	Niche of the Madonna	Upload Photo
Niche of St Joseph	Triq Manwel Dimech c/w Triq San Ġużepp	35°54′34″N 14°30′08″E	00730	Niche of St Joseph	Upload Photo
Niche of the Madonna	Triq San Trofimu c/w 29 Triq Santa Marija	35°54′37″N 14°30′05″E	00731	Niche of the Madonna	Upload Photo
Niche of St. Aloysius Gonzaga	"Borg Pardo", 121 Triq Santa Marija	35°54′37″N 14°30′05″E	00732	Niche of St. Aloysius Gonzaga	Upload Photo
Niche of the Madonna della Cintura	2 Triq Dun Pawl Vella	35°54′38″N 14°30′02″E	00733	Niche of the Madonna della Cintura	Upload Photo
Statue of St Joseph	"Padova", Triq Dun Pawl Vella	35°54′39″N 14°30′02″E	00734	Statue of St Joseph	Upload Photo
Niche of the Madonna of Mount Carmel	41/42 Triq San Trofimu	35°54′38″N 14°30′01″E	00735	Niche of the Madonna of Mount Carmel	Upload Photo
Niche of the Immaculate Conception	31 Triq San Ġwann Battista c/w Triq San Trofimu	35°54′38″N 14°30′00″E	00736	Niche of the Immaculate Conception	Upload Photo
Niche of St Paul	28/29 Triq San Ġwann Battista	35°54′37″N 14°30′00″E	00737	Niche of St Paul	Upload Photo
Niche of the Sacred Heart of the Madonna	Sqaq San Elija, 76 Triq San Trofimu	35°54′39″N 14°29′59″E	00738	Niche of the Sacred Heart of the Madonna	Upload Photo
Niche of the Madonna of Mount Carmel	Triq il-Karmnu c/w 50 Triq San Ġwann Battista	35°54′41″N 14°30′00″E	00739	Niche of the Madonna of Mount Carmel	Upload Photo
Niche of the Madonna of Mount Carmel	97 Triq Santa Marija c/w 80 Triq il-Karmnu	35°54′40″N 14°30′06″E	00740	Niche of the Madonna of Mount Carmel	Upload Photo
Niche of the Madonna	118 Triq Sant'Elena	35°54′46″N 14°30′02″E	00741	Niche of the Madonna	Upload Photo
Niche of the Ecce Homo	165 Triq Sant'Elena	35°54′45″N 14°29′57″E	00742	Niche of the Ecce Homo	Upload Photo
Niche of St. Anne	169 Triq Sant'Elena	35°54′45″N 14°29′57″E	00743	Niche of St. Anne	Upload Photo
Niche of the Madonna of Mount Carmel	26/27 Triq Falzon	35°54′44″N 14°29′56″E	00744	Niche of the Madonna of Mount Carmel	Upload Photo
Niche of the Madonna of Mount Carmel	Triq Falzon c/w Triq San Karlu	35°54′41″N 14°29′54″E	00745	Niche of the Madonna of Mount Carmel	Upload Photo
Niche of St. Anthony	88 Triq Sant'Alfonsu	35°54′40″N 14°29′55″E	00746	Niche of St. Anthony	Upload Photo
Niche of the Madonna of Graces	209 Triq Sant'Elena	35°54′43″N 14°29′52″E	00747	Niche of the Madonna of Graces	Upload Photo
Niche of St. Helen	242 Triq Sant'Elena c/w 237 Triq Manwel Dimech	35°54′41″N 14°29′48″E	00748	Niche of St. Helen	Upload Photo
Niche of the Madonna of Mount Carmel	9 Triq Sant'Elena c/w 236 Triq Manwel Dimech	35°54′41″N 14°29′48″E	00749	Niche of the Madonna of Mount Carmel	Upload Photo
Niche of the Madonna of Mount Carmel	51/52 Triq Sant'Enriku	35°54′39″N 14°29′46″E	00750	Niche of the Madonna of Mount Carmel	Upload Photo
Niche of St Paul	17 Triq Sant'Enriku c/w Triq Kamenzuli	35°54′42″N 14°29′41″E	00751	Niche of St Paul	Upload Photo
Niche of St Joseph	16 Triq Ġafar c/w 30 Triq il-Ħnejja	35°54′44″N 14°29′42″E	00752	Niche of St Joseph	Upload Photo
Niche of St Joseph	49/50 Triq Ġafar	35°54′41″N 14°29′46″E	00753	Niche of St Joseph	Upload Photo
Niche of the Sacred Heart of Jesus	The Cloisters, Triq L-Imrabat	35°54′40″N 14°29′36″E	00754	Niche of the Sacred Heart of Jesus	Upload Photo
Niche of the Madonna of Lourdes	13 Triq il-Ballut c/w Triq Bonavita	35°54′38″N 14°29′36″E	00755	Niche of the Madonna of Lourdes	Upload Photo
Niche of St Joseph	26 Triq il-Ballut c/w Triq Bonavita	35°54′38″N 14°29′36″E	00756	Niche of St Joseph	Upload Photo
Niche of the Madonna of Lourdes	Triq L-Imrabat c/w 61 Triq Tonna	35°54′37″N 14°29′40″E	00757	Niche of the Madonna of Lourdes	Upload Photo
Niche of the Madonna of Mount Carmel	7 Triq L-Imrabat	35°54′37″N 14°29′40″E	00758	Niche of the Madonna of Mount Carmel	Upload Photo
Niche of the Madonna of Lourdes	13/14 Triq Tonna	35°54′38″N 14°29′48″E	00759	Niche of the Madonna of Lourdes	Upload Photo
Niche of St Anthony of Padua	Triq Tonna c/w 141 Triq Manwel Dimech	35°54′39″N 14°29′49″E	00760	Niche of St Anthony of Padua	Upload Photo
Niche of the Madonna of Mount Carmel	Sqaq Sajjan c/w 70 Triq Viani	35°54′34″N 14°29′52″E	00761	Niche of the Madonna of Mount Carmel	Upload Photo
Niche of the Madonna	39 Triq Viani	35°54′33″N 14°29′47″E	00762	Niche of the Madonna	Upload Photo
Niche of the Madonna of Sorrows	39 Triq Viani	35°54′33″N 14°29′47″E	00763		Upload Photo
Niche of St Paul	Triq Ġanni Bencini c/w Triq Rudolfu	35°54′36″N 14°29′49″E	00764	Niche of St Paul	Upload Photo
Niche of the Sacred Heart of the Madonna	113 Triq Rudolfu	35°54′36″N 14°29′47″E	00765	Niche of the Sacred Heart of the Madonna	Upload Photo
Niche of the Madonna of Mount Carmel	33 Triq San Publju c/w 16 Triq San Pawl	35°54′41″N 14°30′15″E	00766	Niche of the Madonna of Mount Carmel	Upload Photo
Niche of St Paul	34 Triq San Publju	35°54′40″N 14°30′15″E	00767	Niche of St Paul	Upload Photo
Niche of Christ the King	22 Triq San Pawl	35°54′41″N 14°30′15″E	00768	Niche of Christ the King	Upload Photo
Niche of St Paul	Triq San Pawl c/w Triq il-Kbira	35°54′43″N 14°30′19″E	00769	Niche of St Paul	Upload Photo
Niche of Christ the King	63 Triq Santa Rita	35°54′35″N 14°30′17″E	00770	Niche of Christ the King	Upload Photo
Niche of St. Rita	39 Triq Santa Rita	35°54′38″N 14°30′15″E	00771	Niche of St. Rita	Upload Photo
Niche of the Madonna of Lourdes	30 Triq il-Lunzjata c/w Triq Castelletti	35°54′38″N 14°30′14″E	00772	Niche of the Madonna of Lourdes	Upload Photo
Niche of the Sacred Heart of the Madonna	24 Triq San Vinċenz c/w Triq San Lawrenz	35°54′36″N 14°30′13″E	00773	Niche of the Sacred Heart of the Madonna	Upload Photo
Niche of St. Dominic	25 Triq San Vinċenz c/w Triq San Lawrenz	35°54′36″N 14°30′13″E	00774	Niche of St. Dominic	Upload Photo
Niche of St. Anne	Pjazza Sant'Anna c/w Ix-Xatt ta' Tignè	35°54′33″N 14°30′20″E	00775	Niche of St. Anne	Upload Photo
Niche of the Madonna of Mount Carmel	38/39 Triq Sant'Antnin	35°54′30″N 14°30′26″E	00776	Niche of the Madonna of Mount Carmel	Upload Photo
Niche of the Madonna of Mount Carmel	19/20 Triq Sir Arturo Mercieca	35°54′51″N 14°30′08″E	00777	Niche of the Madonna of Mount Carmel	Upload Photo
Niche of St Paul	26 Triq San Franġisk	35°54′49″N 14°29′52″E	00778	Niche of St Paul	Upload Photo
Niche of Jesus of Nazareth	58 Triq Nazzarenu	35°54′51″N 14°29′50″E	00779	Niche of Jesus of Nazareth	Upload Photo
Villa Louise (destroyed)	42 Ix-Xatt	35°54′33″N 14°30′11″E	01233		Upload Photo
Villa Drago	Triq it-Torri	35°54′39″N 14°30′25″E	01234	Villa Drago	Upload Photo
Government School	Triq Depiro	35°54′49″N 14°29′59″E	01235	Government School	Upload Photo
Majestic Theatre	Pjazza Sant'Anna	35°54′34″N 14°30′21″E	01236	Majestic Theatre	Upload Photo
Fort Tigné	Tigné Point	35°54′23″N 14°30′48″E	01345	Fort Tigné	Upload Photo
Circular Tower-Keep - Fort Tigné	Tigné Point	35°54′22″N 14°30′48″E	01346	Circular Tower-Keep - Fort Tigné	Upload Photo
Central Traverse - Fort Tigné		35°54′23″N 14°30′48″E	01347		Upload Photo
Casemated Right Face - Fort Tigné	Tigné Point	35°54′24″N 14°30′48″E	01348		Upload Photo
Casemated Left Face - Fort Tigné	Tigné Point	35°54′24″N 14°30′47″E	01349		Upload Photo
Casemated Right Flank - Fort Tigné	Tigné Point	35°54′23″N 14°30′49″E	01350		Upload Photo
Casemated Left Flank - Fort Tigné	Tigné Point	35°54′23″N 14°30′47″E	01351	Casemated Left Flank - Fort Tigné	Upload Photo
Right Courtyard - Fort Tigné	Tigné Point	35°54′23″N 14°30′48″E	01352		Upload Photo
Left Courtyard - Fort Tigné	Tigné Point	35°54′23″N 14°30′47″E	01353		Upload Photo
Ditch - Fort Tigné	Tigné Point	35°54′24″N 14°30′50″E	01354	Ditch - Fort Tigné	Upload Photo
Right Counterscarp Galley - Fort Tigné	Tigné Point	35°54′24″N 14°30′50″E	01355		Upload Photo
Centre Counterscarp Gallery - Fort Tigné	Tigné Point	35°54′26″N 14°30′47″E	01356		Upload Photo
Left Counterscarp Gallery - Fort Tigné	Tigné Point	35°54′23″N 14°30′45″E	01357		Upload Photo
Scarp masonry revetment - Fort Tigné	Tigné Point	35°54′21″N 14°30′48″E	01358	Scarp masonry revetment - Fort Tigné	Upload Photo
Flight of Steps from seashore - Fort Tigné	Tigné Point	35°54′21″N 14°30′48″E	01359	Flight of Steps from seashore - Fort Tigné	Upload Photo
Remains of vaulted cistern - Fort Tigné	Tigné Point	35°54′21″N 14°30′49″E	01360		Upload Photo
St Julian's Tower and Battery	Triq it-Torri	35°55′04″N 14°29′57″E	01383	St Julian's Tower and Battery	Upload Photo
Church of the Madonna Mediatrix of all Graces	95 Triq il-Kbira	35°54′44″N 14°30′14″E	01804	Church of the Madonna Mediatrix of all Graces	Upload Photo
No 5, Il-Pjazzetta	Triq il-Lembi c/w Triq it-Torri	35°54′43″N 14°30′22″E	01895	No 5, Il-Pjazzetta	Upload Photo
n/a	22 Triq tal-Katidral (Note: No name is provided in the official inventory.)	35°54′38″N 14°30′19″E	02568		Upload Photo
