= BirdLife Cyprus =

Cypriot ornithological conservation organization

- Formation: 2003; 23 years ago
- Type: NGO
- Purpose: Conservation
- Headquarters: Kato Deftera, Nicosia
- Region served: Cyprus
- Director: Melpo Apostolidou
- Website: BirdLife Cyprus

BirdLife Cyprus (BLC) is an environmental non-governmental organisation dedicated to the conservation of birds and their habitats on the island of Cyprus in the eastern Mediterranean, for which it is the BirdLife International partner organisation. The emblem of BLC is the Cyprus wheatear, which is an endemic species (it breeds only on the island).

== History ==
BirdLife Cyprus was formed in 2003 through the merger of two Cyprus Ornithological Societies, and now has offices in Kato Deftera, Nicosia. It is the national partner of BirdLife International, a global partnership of nature conservation organisations working in more than one hundred countries worldwide.

BirdLife Cyprus is currently the most active conservation organisation in Cyprus, running campaigns against illegal bird trapping and poaching. Other activities include the designation and protection of Important Bird Areas as Special Protection Areas, as well as campaigns in the area of agriculture, education and awareness-raising.

== Activities ==
Activities include an ongoing campaign against the illegal bird trapping of wild birds, the protection of Important Bird Areas, the establishment of Special Protection Areas under the European Union's Birds Directive, and the promotion of environmentally friendly agriculture.

BirdLife Cyprus campaigns at both local and European levels on behalf of birds and their habitats here Cyprus:

Monitoring and counts: Effective conservation action is impossible without reliable bird population data. As well as producing monthly and annual reports for bird sightings, BirdLife Cyprus has set up and run systematic and scientific monitoring schemes such as monthly counts of wetland birds, a common bird census and surveys of migrating raptors. BirdLife Cyprus is also responsible for the Cyprus bird ringing scheme, and is a member of the European Union for Bird Ringing (EURING).

Habitats: BirdLife Cyprus campaigns to ensure official designation of the scientifically identified Important Bird Areas (IBAs) as Special Protection Areas (SPAs). SPAs form part of the pan-European Natura 2000 network of biodiversity hotspots. These SPAs should be managed to ensure proper conservation of the bird species they support and sustainable development of local communities.

Illegal bird trapping: BirdLife Cyprus is working to bring an end to illegal bird trapping. Birds trapped on limesticks and in nets die a horrible death and are then sold to be eaten as ambelopoulia, a supposed delicacy. Many migratory and threatened species fall victim to the indiscriminate nets and glue sticks. A recent opinion poll showed that the majority of Cypriots are against this illegal activity. It is estimated that over 2 million birds were killed in 2015 including over 800,000 on the British Territories.

Agriculture: The predominantly low-intensity agriculture in Cyprus makes it an attractive place for birds. Agricultural intensification in Europe has had a well-documented and disastrous effect on farmland birds. BirdLife Cyprus promotes a set of practical proposals to ensure local farming practices are kept wildlife-friendly.

Education: BirdLife Cyprus also runs environmental education and outreach programmes, including school visits, citizen-science activities and outdoor learning. In 2025 it launched Thkio Mosfilies, a 30,000 m² outdoor learning space in the Famagusta district, offering hands-on nature education for schools and families.

Projects: BirdLife Cyprus implements a range of conservation projects across the island, focusing on habitat protection, species conservation and biodiversity management. The Akrotiri Cape Pyla Darwin Project and Akrotiri Marsh Restoration project aimed to improve the conservation status of important wetland habitats and migratory bird sites in Cyprus. The Oroklini Project focused on the restoration and management of Oroklini Lake, an Important Bird Area of international importance. BirdLife Cyprus also participates in LIFE IP Physis, a nationwide initiative supporting the implementation of Cyprus’s biodiversity strategy and Natura 2000 framework. Another flagship project, LIFE with Vultures, focused on the conservation and recovery of the Griffon Vulture population in Cyprus through targeted protection and monitoring measures.

Birdwatching: BirdLife Cyprus promotes birdwatching as a tool for conservation awareness and sustainable nature tourism. The organisation organises guided birdwatching tours and field trips across key sites in Cyprus, focusing on resident and migratory bird species. It also provides online birdwatching resources, including information on important birding locations, seasonal migration patterns and species identification, aimed at both local and visiting birdwatchers.
