= Bird Life =

1975 book by Ian Rowley

- First edition
- Author: Ian Rowley
- Language: English
- Series: The Australian Naturalist Library
- Subject: Australian birds
- Genre: Zoology
- Publisher: Collins (Australia): Sydney
- Publication date: 1975
- Media type: Print (hardcover)
- Pages: 284
- ISBN: 0-00-211438-0

Bird Life is a book written by Australian ornithologist Ian Rowley and published by Collins (Australia) in 1975 as part of its Australian Naturalist Library series. It was issued in octavo format (224 x 150 mm), containing 284 pages, bound in brown cloth with a dust jacket illustrated by a painting of a superb fairy-wren. The book is illustrated with numerous photographs, drawings and diagrams and is dedicated by the author: "To my father Duncan Rowley who kindled my interest in birds".
