= BirdLife International =

Conservation organization for birds, headquartered in Cambridge

- Formation: June 20, 1922; 104 years ago
- Type: INGO
- Purpose: Conservation
- Headquarters: Cambridge, United Kingdom
- Region served: Worldwide
- Chairman: Dr Mike Rands
- CEO: Martin Harper
- Website: www.birdlife.org
- Formerly called: International Council for Bird Preservation

BirdLife International is a global partnership of non-governmental organizations that strives to conserve birds and their habitats. BirdLife International's priorities include preventing extinction of bird species, identifying and safeguarding important sites for birds, maintaining and restoring key bird habitats, and empowering conservationists worldwide.

It has a membership of more than 2.5 million people across 116 country partner organizations, including the Royal Society for the Protection of Birds, the Wild Bird Society of Japan, the National Audubon Society, and American Bird Conservancy.

BirdLife International has identified 13,000 Important Bird and Biodiversity Areas and is the official International Union for Conservation of Nature's Red List authority for birds. As of 2015, BirdLife International has established that 1,375 bird species (13% of the total) are threatened with extinction (critically endangered, endangered or vulnerable). In 2025 BirdLife International adopted the AviList global avian taxonomy.

BirdLife International publishes a quarterly magazine, BirdLife: The Magazine, which contains recent news and authoritative articles about birds and their conservation, and publishes its official journal Bird Conservation International with Cambridge University Press.

== History ==
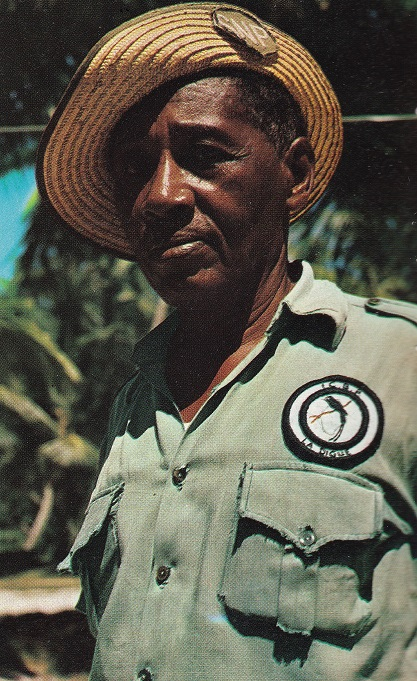
A warden with an ICBP mark on his uniform on La Digue, Seychelles in the 1970s

BirdLife International was founded in 1922 as the International Council for Bird Protection by American ornithologists T. Gilbert Pearson and Jean Theodore Delacour. The group was renamed International Committee for Bird Preservation in 1928, International Council for Bird Preservation in 1960, and BirdLife International in 1993.

== Global programmes ==
BirdLife International has nine conservation programmes implemented across Africa, the Americas, Asia, Europe and Central Asia, the Middle East and the Pacific. The programmes provide the framework for planning, implementing, monitoring and evaluating conservation work and include the Important Bird and Biodiversity Areas Programme, Marine Programme, Preventing Extinctions Programme, and Flyways Programme.

== Controversies ==
=== Renaming of Wild Bird Federation Taiwan ===
In 2008, the English name of Wild Bird Federation Taiwan was renamed to Chinese Wild Bird Federation in order to comply with BirdLife International's demand, stemming from People's Republic of China's pressure. Following the organization's removal from BirdLife International in 2020, the English name was changed to Taiwan Wild Bird Federation (TWBF).

=== Removal of Taiwan's Chinese Wild Bird Federation ===
In December 2019, BirdLife International asked Taiwan's then named Chinese Wild Bird Federation (CWBF), to address the following issues or risk removal from its partnership program:

1. The organization's Chinese name (Chinese: 中華民國野鳥學會 lit. 'Republic of China Wild Bird Federation') poses an operational risk for BirdLife International and should be changed.
2. CWBF was to sign a document formally committing to not promote or advocate for the legitimacy of the Republic of China (Taiwan).
3. BirdLife International would no longer participate in or allow its logo to be associated with any event related to or funded, in part or in whole, by the Taiwanese government or its agencies.
4. BirdLife International would no longer allow its name or logo to be used in any document where the Taiwanese flag, symbols, or emblems were displayed.

However, BirdLife International stated that even if CWBF were to address all of its demands, it may still be removed from BirdLife International's partnership program. On 7 September 2020, before CWBF had the opportunity to discuss BirdLife International's demands in its General Assembly meeting, BirdLife International Global Council voted to remove CWBF from its partnership program.

BirdLife International CEO Patricia Zurita subsequently issued what Reuters described as a "gag order", directing her staff to not comment publicly on the "sadly public statement" from CWBF. "If you receive any queries regarding this matter, please DO NOT offer comment and instead refer the matter to me directly," Zurita wrote.

Correspondence between CWBF and BirdLife International was released by CWBF on 19 September 2020 to demonstrate that CWBF had been negotiating in good faith prior to its removal and was willing to discuss the name change.
