= Llanfachraeth =

Village and community in Anglesey, Wales

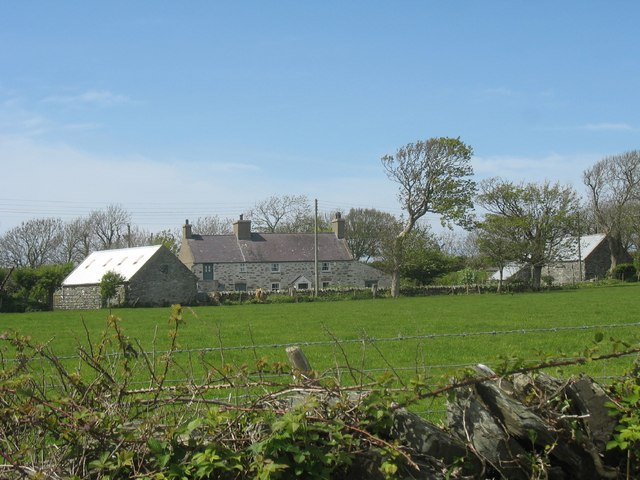
- Ty'n y Maen Farmhouse at Stryd-y-Facsen

- Location within Anglesey
- Population: 589 (2011)
- OS grid reference: SH3182
- Community: Llanfachraeth
- Principal area: Anglesey
- Preserved county: Gwynedd
- Country: Wales
- Sovereign state: United Kingdom
- Post town: HOLYHEAD
- Postcode district: LL65
- Dialling code: 01407
- Police: North Wales
- Fire: North Wales
- Ambulance: Welsh
- UK Parliament: Ynys Môn
- Senedd Cymru – Welsh Parliament: Bangor Conwy Môn
- List of places UK Wales Anglesey 53.313°N 4.531°W Map of the community

Llanfachraeth is a village and community in Anglesey, Wales. It is located near the west coast of the island, at the head of the Alaw estuary, 6.2 miles (10.0 km) east of Holyhead, 11.7 miles (18.8 km) south west of Amlwch and 11.3 miles (18.2 km) north west of Llangefni. The A5025 road runs through the village. A bus service operates along this road daily, except for Sundays, running between Cemaes, Llanfaethlu, Llanfachraeth and Holyhead. The Wales Coast Path is forced inland here to cross the Afon Alaw. The village has a pub and accommodation is provided by the Holland Hotel.

== Demographics ==
At the 2001 census the community had a population of 566, increasing slightly at the 2011 census to 589.

== Landmarks ==
In the extreme north of the community, on the border with Llanfaethlu, stands Gronant, a Grade II* listed sub-medieval house dating from around 1540. A second house was built around 1618. In the 19th century the two houses were joined and a bell turret, used to call servants for meals, was added. The former servants' loft contains fragments of an original wallpainting. Other notable buildings in or near the village includes the Church of St Figael one mile to the east, Capel Abarim, Capel Pont yr Arw, and Bethesda Congregational Chapel, all Grade II listed buildings, but the Church of St Machraeth itself is not listed.

== Geography ==
The Alaw estuary forms part of the Beddmanarch–Cymyran site of special scientific interest, which also extends across the mudflats between Holy Island and mainland Anglesey. The area contains large areas of seagrass and salt marsh, and is an important wintering area for ringed plovers, greenshanks, red-breasted mergansers and goldeneyes.

The community includes the hamlet of Llanfugail or Llanfigail. See St Figael's Church, Llanfigael.

== Notable people ==
- Thomas Jesse Jones (1873–1950) a Welsh-American sociologist and educational administrator; his family emigrated to Ohio in 1884.
