= Bird conservation =

Field in the science of conservation biology related to threatened birds

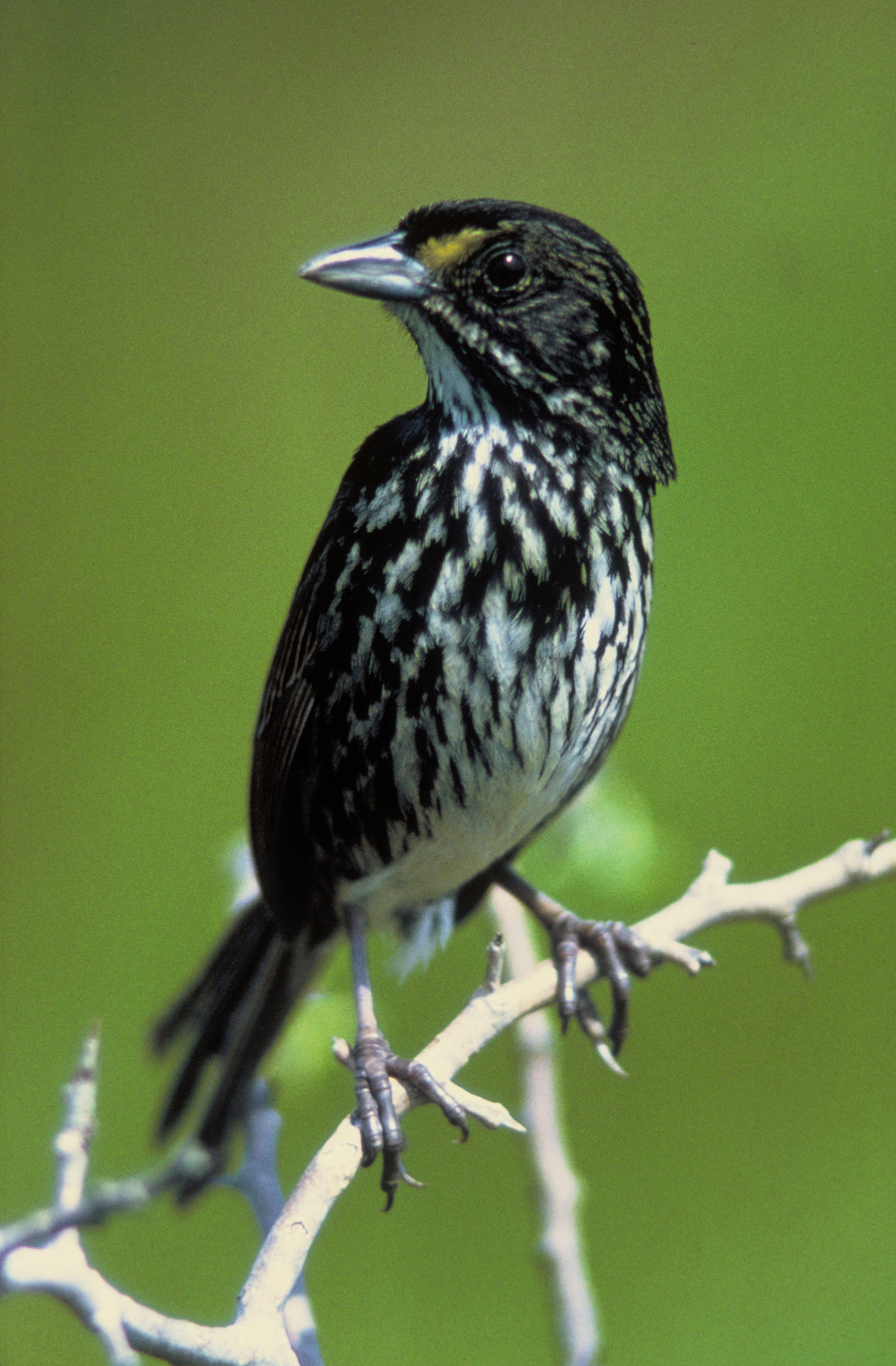
The extinction of the dusky seaside sparrow (Ammospiza maritima nigrescens) was caused by habitat loss.

Bird conservation is a field in the science of conservation biology related to threatened birds. Bird conservation efforts aim to protect species and mitigate the decline of threatened bird population numbers. According to Worldwatch Institute, many bird populations are currently declining worldwide, with 1,200 species facing extinction in the next century. Current estimates imply a total of nearly 11,000 extant species, suggesting that 11.6% of all bird species, a near ratio of one in nine birds, have gone extinct over the last 126,000 years of human history. The biggest cited reason surrounds habitat loss. Other threats include overhunting, structural collisions, long-line fishing bycatch, pollution, competition and predation by pet cats, oil spills and pesticide use and climate change. Governments, along with numerous conservation charities, work to protect birds in various ways, including legislation, preserving and restoring bird habitat, and establishing captive populations for reintroductions.

See Late Quaternary prehistoric birds for birds which disappeared in prehistoric and early historic times, usually due to human activity (i.e., starting with the Upper Paleolithic Revolution). For birds having gone extinct in modern times (since 1500), see List of extinct birds.

== Historical Analysis ==
=== Prehistory to Early History ===
Since the Late Pleistocene period, it is estimated that 1,430 (95% credible interval: 1327–1544) bird extinctions have occurred. Human activity has been directly attributed to almost all bird species extinctions, specifically prehistoric and early historical species. During the Upper Paleolithic period, human societies began spreading across the globe, leading to the overhunting of species and the introduction of invasive species to new environments. A particularly significant period of extinction occurred when humans colonized the islands of Melanesia, Polynesia, and Micronesia around 4,000 years ago. According to a study published in Proceedings of the National Academy of Sciences, early Polynesian settlers are often credited with contributing to the extinction of over 1,000 bird species during this time, majority of which were non-passerine land birds.

=== Pre-Industrial Era into the Industrial Era ===
Before the Industrial Revolution (1750-1850), most bird species were not yet heavily impacted by habitat loss or climate change. However, overexploitation through hunting, bird collecting, as well as the introduction of invasive species became significant threats. Industrialization marked a turning point in the relationship between humans and birds. The technological growth, urban expansion, and increased emissions from industrial activity caused widespread habitat destruction and altered ecosystems. In the United Kingdom, species such as the white-tailed eagle (Haliaeetus albicilla) and cranes, for example, were recognized as more abundant before industrialization began. By the 19th century, the advent of industrial-scale hunting and urban sprawl had put pressure on many bird populations.

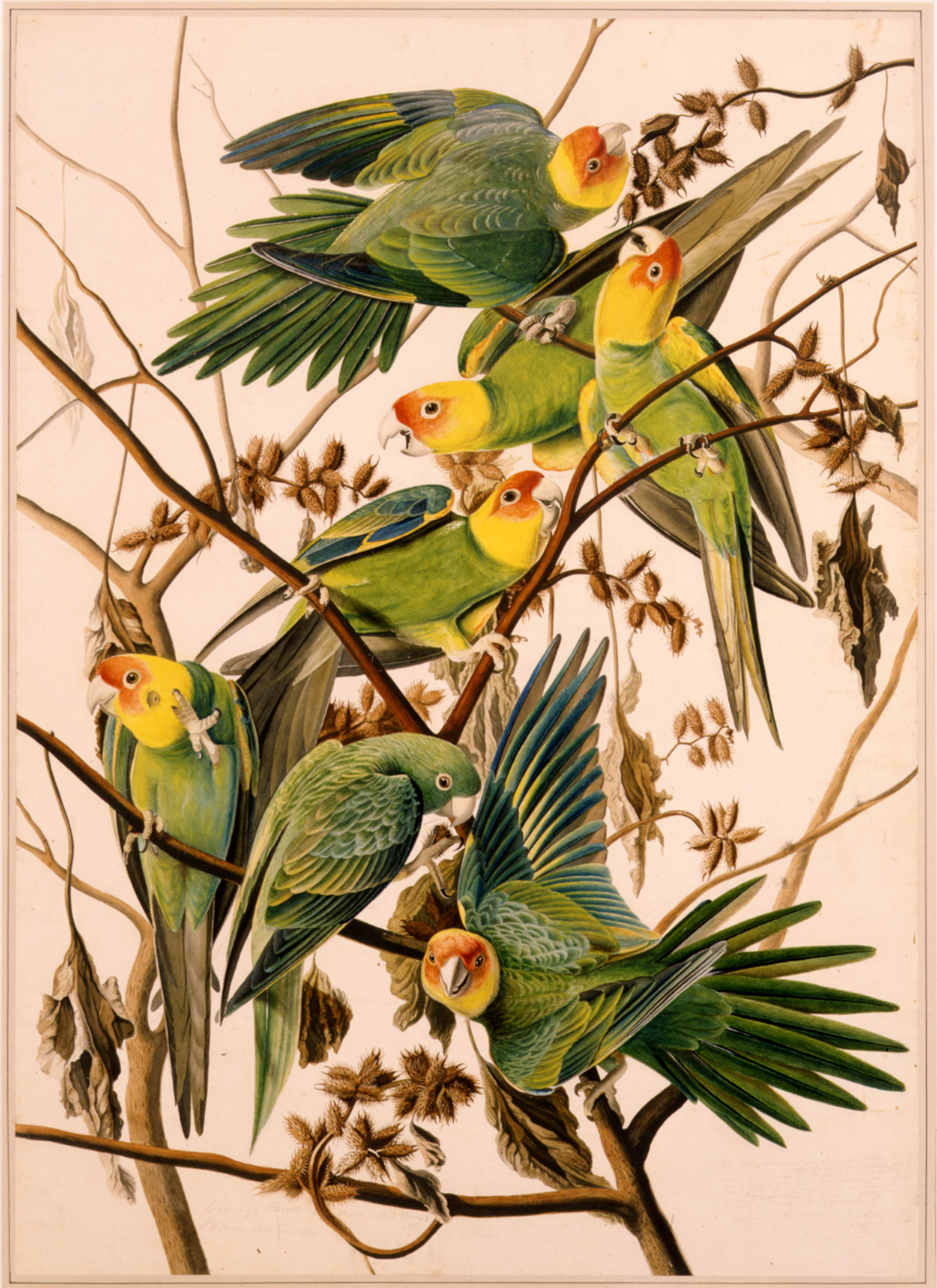
Illustration of Carolina parakeets (Conuropsis carolinensis) by John James Audubon

In North America, the Carolina parakeet (Conuropsis carolinensis) one of the few parrots indigenous to the United States, suffered from Industrial era deforestation and hunting (both for its colorful feathers, and because the birds were thought to feed on crops), which helped destroy wild populations. The species' final extinction came in the early 20th century, though causes remain unclear.

Similarly, the passenger pigeon (Ectopistes migratorius) once one of the most populous bird species in North America, was driven to extinction in the early 20th century due to relentless hunting and habitat loss. This extinction served as a stark reminder of the fragility of bird populations in the face of human intervention. The loss of such a previously abundant species helped catalyze the first major bird conservation efforts in the United States. Following the assumed extinction of passenger pigeons, Theodore Roosevelt claimed to have witnessed a small flock of the birds at his family name’s rural cabin in Virginia some 25 years after their extinction (March 24, 1900). Following this sighting, Theodore recognized the severity of the loss of this once abundant species and initiated strengthened bird advocacy legislation during his presidency in 1907. The establishment of the first Federal Bird Reserve on Pelican Island in Florida can be attributed to this sighting made by President Roosevelt.

=== Advocacy in the 20th Century ===
The early 20th century saw the rise of formal conservation efforts. The National Audubon Society, founded in 1905, played a key role in raising awareness about the rapid decline of bird populations, specifically in response to the exploitation of birds for the feather trade. The organization's efforts were influential in propelling early legal protections for birds. A significant achievement in favor of bird protection was the passage of the Migratory Bird Treaty Act of 1918. This act provided international protection for migratory bird species between the United States, Canada, Mexico, Japan, and Russia.

From the 1920s to 1950s, bird advocacy gained further strength. In 1934, the Duck Stamp Act was passed. It sought to fund the protection of wetlands using hunter fees. Additionally, during the Great Depression, New Deal programs including the Civilian Conservation Corps preserved wildlife refuges, providing birds a thriving environment for bird species. Birdwatching gained popularity within this timeframe, too, in large part thanks to Roger Tory Peterson’s groundbreaking field guides. Finally, Rachel Carson's early works began to clarify the relationship between healthy bird populations and a healthy planet. All of these factors laid more solid groundwork for the continuation of advocacy for birds.

The 1960s were a particularly pivotal era in favor of bird conservation. The publication of Rachel Carson’s Silent Spring (1962) aided in exposing widespread dangers of pesticide use, particularly DDT, on bird populations. Her groundbreaking work demonstrated how DDT led to the thinning of eggshells in species like the bald eagle (Haliaeetus leucocephalus) and peregrine falcon (Falco peregrinus), resulting in reproductive failures. Carson’s book ignited a broader environmental movement, leading to significant policy changes, and the eventual DDT ban. The Environmental Protection Agency enforced a generalized ban on DDT pesticides in 1972. Bald eagles made a famous comeback during the “dirty sixties” thanks to this ban, along with the brown pelican (Pelecanus occidentalis) and peregrine falcon.

By the 1980s, the global conservation movement gained further momentum. Organizations like BirdLife International played an increasingly vital role in establishing international frameworks for bird protection. This included efforts to protect critical habitats, such as wetland areas, and to monitor at-risk species. Additionally, the International Union for Conservation of Nature (IUCN) developed the Red List of Threatened Species, which continues to serve as an important tool for identifying and tracking species at risk of extinction, including many bird species.

== Threats to birds ==
=== Habitat loss ===
The most critical threat facing threatened birds is the destruction and fragmentation of habitat. The loss of forests, plains and other natural systems into agriculture, mines, and urban developments, the draining of swamps and other wetlands, and logging reduce potential habitat for many species. In addition the remaining patches of habitat are often too small or fragmented by the construction of roads or other such barriers that cause populations in these fragmented islands to become vulnerable to localized extinction. In addition many forest species show limited abilities to disperse and occupy new forest fragments (see island biogeography). The loss of tropical rainforest is the most pressing problem, as these forests hold the highest number of species yet are being destroyed quickly. Habitat loss has been implicated in a number of extinctions, including the ivory-billed woodpecker (Campephilus principalis) (disputed because of "rediscovery"), Bachman's warbler (Vermivora bachmanii), and the dusky seaside sparrow (Ammospiza maritima nigrescens).

=== Climate change ===
Climate change is a catalyst for the worrying downward trend of bird populations globally. The speed of human-caused climate change is currently unprecedented, leading bird species into continuously unadaptable circumstances. The American Bird Conservancy states there is a clear and direct comparison between bird population decline and climate change, stating that “[w]arming temperatures are changing where birds live, the timing of their migration patterns and egg laying, and even the sizes and shapes of their bodies.”

==== Direct impacts ====
It has been observed that most North American bird species have been recognized over the prior few decades to have shifted their breeding ranges irregularly due to climate change. Migratory birds are more prone to the effects of climate change, leading to shifts in time migratory patterns. It is predicted in the coming years that mountainous birds will even lose suitable migratory habitats due to rising temperatures at higher elevations. On top of these migratory shifts, global warming has been predicted to be changing size and wing length proportionally in all bird species. It is presumed that with rising temperatures, smaller birds maintain better competitive fitness thanks to their easier heat dispersal compared to their larger counterparts within the same species.

==== Indirect impacts ====
Indirect impacts of climate change on birds include increased drought and fires, rising-sea levels, increased disease, phenological mismatch, and uncommon interactions between species. Increase in drought leads to increased fires, destroying nesting ground and fragmenting specifically sagebrush ecosystems. Rise in sea-levels provides similar altercations for marsh-nesting birds. Nesting sites disappear as sea-levels rise, eliminating habitats for nesting parents and young to continue species. Phenological mismatch occurs due to rising temperatures shifting migratory timeframes but not quickly enough, altering the life cycle events in interacting species at different rates.

=== Pollution ===
Birds are afflicted by numerous pollutants including marine oil pollution, plastic pollution, light pollution, sound pollution, air pollution, and pesticides to name a major few. Plastic pollution serves a major detriment to birds, mainly marine birds. Many marine birds suffer from entanglement, nutritional deprivation, and gut damage due to ingested plastic litter.

=== Introduced species ===
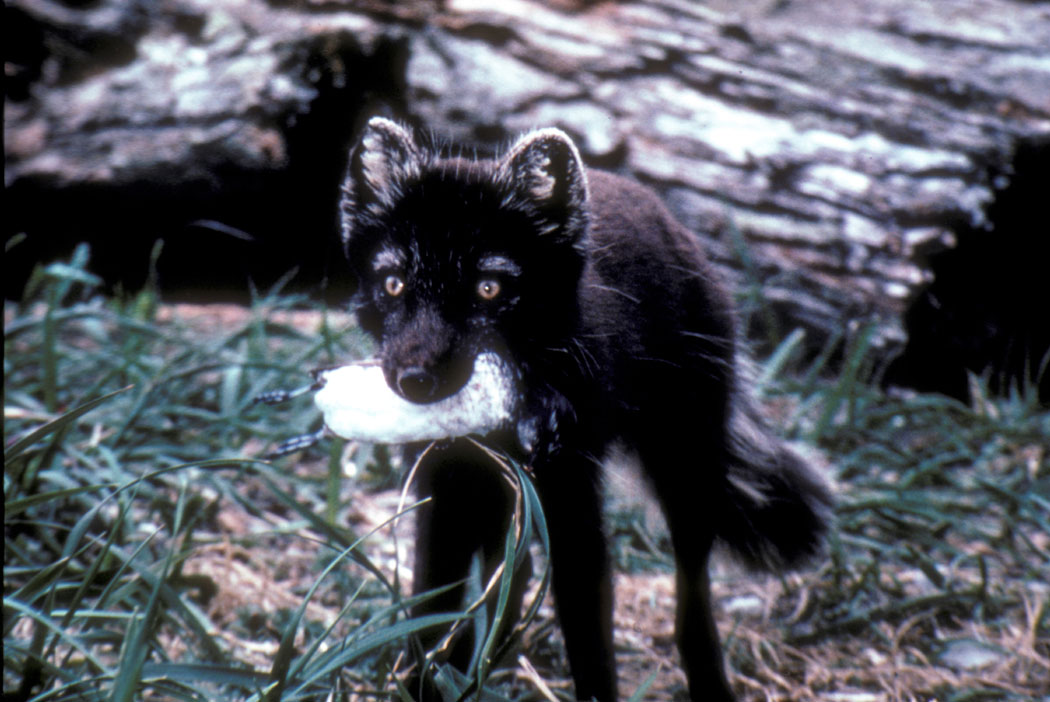
Arctic foxes (Vulpes lagopus) introduced to the Aleutian Islands devastated populations of auks; here a least auklet (Aethia pusilla) has been taken.

Historically the threat posed by introduced species has probably caused the most extinctions of birds, particularly on islands. most prehistoric human caused extinctions were insular as well. Many island species evolved in the absence of predators and consequently lost many anti-predator behaviors. As humans traveled around the world they brought with them many foreign animals which disturbed these island species. Some of these were unfamiliar predators, like rats, feral cats, and pigs; others were competitors, such as other bird species, or herbivores that degraded breeding habitat. Disease can also play a role; introduced avian malaria is thought to be a primary cause of many extinctions in Hawaii. The dodo (Raphus cucullatus) is the most famous example of a species that was probably driven to extinction by introduced species (although human hunting also played a role), other species that were victims of introduced species were the Lyall's wren (Traversia lyalli), poʻo-uli (Melamprosops phaeosoma), and the Laysan millerbird (Acrocephalus familiaris familiaris) . Many species currently threatened with extinction are vulnerable to introduced species, such as the kōkako (Callaeas species), black robin (Petroica traversi), Mariana crow (Corvus kubaryi), and the Hawaiian duck (Anas wyvilliana).

=== Hunting and exploitation ===
Humans have exploited birds for a very long time, and sometimes this exploitation has resulted in extinction. Overhunting occurred in some instances with a naive species unfamiliar with humans, such as the moa of New Zealand, in other cases it was an industrial level of hunting that led to extinction. The passenger pigeon was once the most numerous species of bird alive (possibly ever), overhunting reduced a species that once numbered in the billions to extinction. Hunting pressure can be for food, sport, feathers, or even come from scientists collecting museum specimens. Collection of great auks for museums pushed the already rare species to extinction.

==== Pet trade ====
The harvesting of parrots for the pet trade has led to many species becoming endangered. Between 1986 and 1988, two million parrots were legally imported into the US alone. Parrots are also illegally smuggled between countries, and rarer species can command high prices.

Organized entrapment of birds takes place today across the globe, specifically in Latin America, Asia, and Africa. The demand for exotic pet birds in the United States drives capture in Bolivia and Mexico, with a supposed over 22,000 individuals of 31 parrot species illegally traded under Bolivian law every year and an estimated 65,000–78,500 parrots captured every year in Mexico. This poaching continues due to the potential profits, with rarer species selling for up to $1,000 each when caught illegally.

As part of finding solutions to the Asian Songbird Crisis, research conducted by a team led by EcoVerde Global Consulting found that the crested jayshrike is used as a “master bird” to train songbird species. It received legal protection in Indonesia in 2018, but this has no effect on the trade in the bird markets, and the number of individuals that were observed in bird markets remained unchanged over a 15 year period

==== Plume trade ====
Plume hunting is the hunting of wild birds to harvest their decorative feathers. More decorative plumes, which were sold for use as ornamentation particularly in hat-making, were more sought after in the trade. While the plume trade is not necessarily a large ongoing threat to birds, it was in its height in the late 19th century into the early 20th century until protective efforts were instated.

=== Hybridization ===
Hybridization may also endanger birds, damaging the gene stock. For example, the American black duck (Anas rubripes) has been often reported hybridizing with the mallard (Anas platyrhynchos), starting a slow decline in the rarer A. rubripes.

Gamebird hybrids are particularly common and many breeders produce hybrids that may be accidentally or intentionally introduced into the wild.

=== Other threats ===
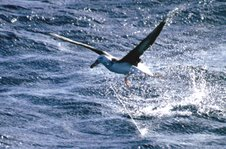
This black-browed albatross (Thalassarche melanophris) has been hooked on a long-line.

Birds face a number of other threats. Pollution has led to serious declines in some species. Increasingly large volumes of plastic waste are being transported by wind and ocean currents throughout the planet, and mistaken ingestion by many species is eventually fatal. Seabirds are also vulnerable to oil spills, which destroy the plumage's waterproofing, causing the birds to drown or die of hypothermia. Light pollution can also have a damaging effect on some species, particularly nocturnal seabirds such as petrels. The pesticide DDT was responsible for thinning egg shells in nesting birds, particularly seabirds and birds of prey that are high on the food chain. The use of pesticides continues to harm birds, especially insectivores like swallows that have lost a food source from the use of insecticides in agriculture. A particularly dangerous class of pesticides is the seed-coating neonicotinoids. Neonicotinoids include a neurotoxin that bioaccumulates in the tissue of birds and is associated with impairment of reproduction.

Seabirds face another threat in the form of bycatch, where birds in the water become tangled in fishing nets or hooked on lines set out by long-line fisheries. As many as 100,000 albatrosses are hooked and drown each year on tuna lines set out by long-line fisheries.

Birds are also threatened by high rise buildings, communications towers, and other human-related activities and structures; estimates vary from about 3.5 to 975 million birds a year in the North America alone. The largest source of human-related bird death is due to glass windows, which kill 100–900 million birds a year. The next largest sources of human-caused death are hunting (100+ million), house cats (100 million), cars and trucks (50 to 100 million), electric power lines (174 million), and pesticides (67 million). Birds are also killed in large quantities by flying into communication tower guidelines, usually after being attracted by tower lights. This phenomenon is called towerkill and is responsible for 5–50 million birds deaths a year. Similarly, natural gas flaring can attract and kill large numbers of birds. Approximately 7,500 migrating songbirds were attracted to and killed by the flare at the liquefied natural gas terminal in Saint John, New Brunswick, Canada, on September 13, 2013. Similar incidents have occurred at flares on offshore oil and gas installations.

U.S. President Donald Trump's opposition to wind power involves repeated claims that "windmills" "kill the birds", but cats in the U.S. actually kill on the order of 10,000 times as many birds as wind turbines.

The recent growth in the renewable energy industry is also increasing the threat to birds farther away from dense human population centers. As of late 2019, the capacity of wind power in the U.S. reached 100 GW (gigawatt). Studies conducted at a variety of farms found fewer than 14, and typically fewer than 4, direct bird deaths per year per installed megawatt; suggesting cumulative mortality is approaching the order of a million individuals annually. Migrating songbirds appeared to be the most strongly impacted in some studies. The primary impact of commercial solar farms – the majority utilizing photovoltaic collectors which are mounted near the ground – is from extensive land clearing and increases in long-distance power transmission infrastructure. In 2015, biologists working for the state of California estimated that 3,500 birds died at the Ivanpah concentrated solar power demonstration plant in the span of a year; "many of them burned alive while flying near the tower collector where air temperatures reached up to 1,000 degrees Fahrenheit."

According to a 2018 Nature paper studying trends in global waterbird populations, ineffective governance is a major driver of biodiversity loss in wetlands, highlighting the importance of political and institutional factors in conservation outcomes.

== Conservation techniques ==
Scientists and conservation professionals have developed a number of techniques to protect bird species. These techniques have had varying levels of success.

=== Captive breeding ===
Captive breeding, or ex-situ conservation, has been used in a number of instances to save species from extinction. The principle is to create a viable population of a species in either zoos or breeding facilities, for later reintroduction back into the wild. A captive population can either serve as an insurance against the species going extinct in the wild or as a last-ditch effort in situations where conservation in the wild is impossible. Captive breeding has been used to save several species from extinction, the most famous example being the California condor, a species that declined to less than thirty birds. In order to save the California condor the decision was made to take every individual left in the wild into captivity. From these 22 individuals a breeding program began that brought the numbers up to 273 by 2005. An even more impressive recovery was that of the Mauritius kestrel (Falco punctatus), which by 1974 had dropped to only four individuals, yet by 2006 the population increased to 800.

=== Reintroduction and translocations ===
Reintroductions of captive bred populations can occur to replenish wild populations of an endangered species, to create new populations or to restore a species after it has become extinct in the wild. Reintroductions helped bring the wild populations of Hawaiian geese (nene) (Branta sandvicensis) from 30 birds to over 500. The Mauritius kestrel was successfully reintroduced into the wild after its captive breeding programme. Reintroductions can be very difficult and often fail if insufficient preparations are made, as species born in captivity may lack the skills and knowledge needed for life in the wild after living in captivity. Reintroductions can also fail if the causes of a birds decline have not been adequately addressed. Attempts to reintroduce the Bali starling (Leucopsar rothschildi) into the wild failed due to continued poaching of reintroduced birds.

The introduction of captives of unknown pedigree can also pose a threat to native populations. Domestic fowl have threatened endemic species such as Gallus g. bankiva while pheasants such as the ring-necked pheasant (Phasianus colchicus) and captive cheer pheasants (Catreus wallichii) of uncertain origin have escaped into the wild or have been intentionally introduced. Green peafowl (Pavo muticus) of similar mixed origins confiscated from local bird dealers have been released into areas with native wild birds.

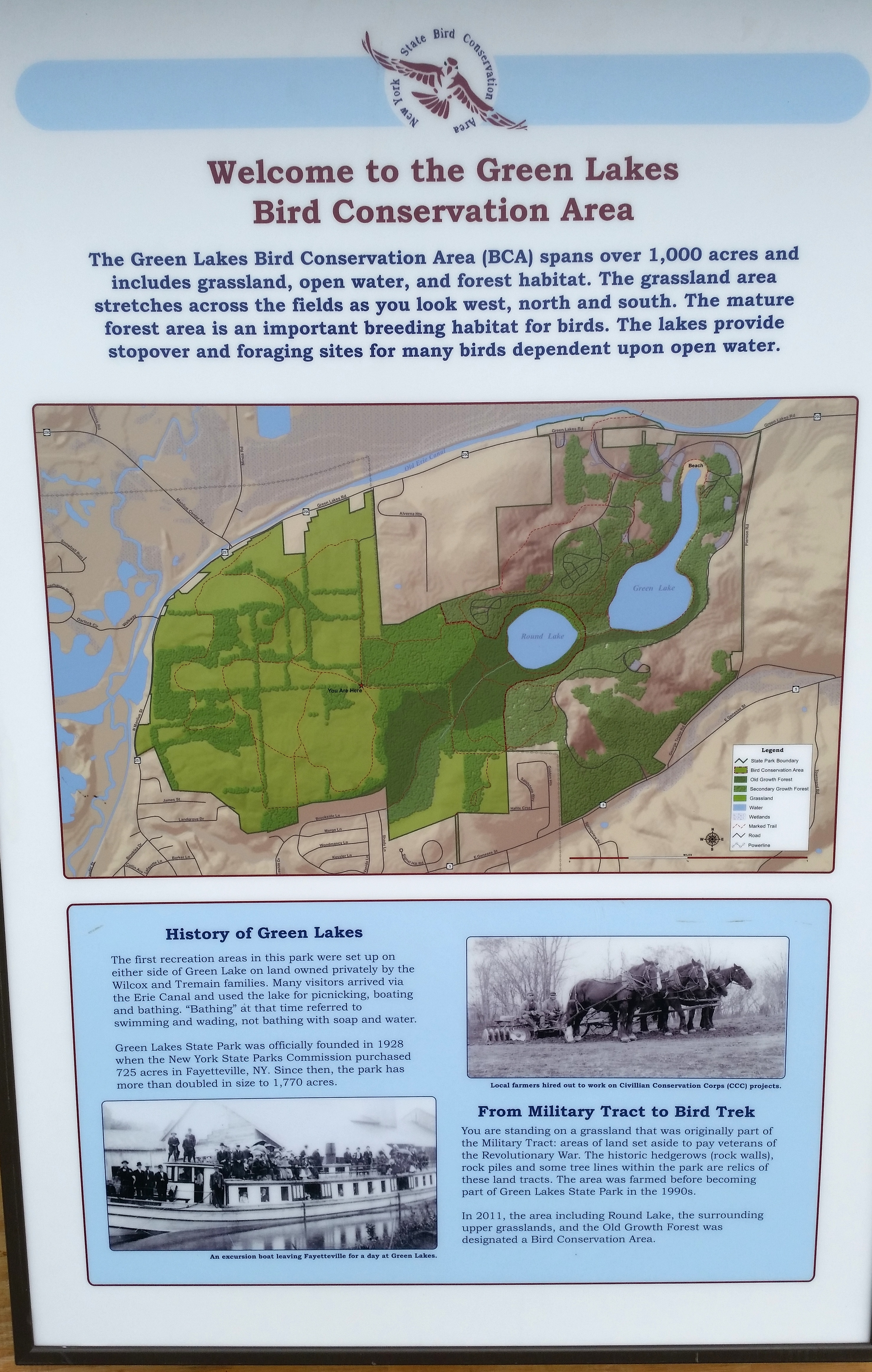
Bird conservation area, Green Lakes State Park, Manlius, New York

Translocations involve moving populations of threatened species into areas of suitable habitat currently unused by the species. There are several reasons for doing this; the creation of secondary populations that act as an insurance against disaster, or in many cases threats faced by the original population in its current location. One famous translocation was of the kākāpō (Strigops habroptilus) of New Zealand. These large flightless parrots were unable to cope with introduced predators in their remaining habitat on Stewart Island, so were moved to smaller offshore islands that had been cleared of predators. From there a recovery program has managed to maintain and eventually increase their numbers.

=== Habitat protection ===
As the loss and destruction of habitat is the most serious threat facing many bird species, conservation organizations and government agencies tasked with protecting birds work to protect areas of natural habitat. This can be achieved through purchasing land of conservation importance, setting aside land or gazetting it as a national park or other protected area, and passing legislation preventing landowners from undertaking damaging land use practices, or paying them not to undertake those activities. The goals of habitat protection for birds and other threatened animals and plants often conflicts with other stakeholders, such as landowners and businesses, who can face economically damaging restrictions on their activities. Plans to protect crucial habitat for the spotted owl (Strix occidentalis) of North America required the protection of large areas of old growth forest in the western United States; this was opposed by logging companies who claimed it would cause job losses and reduced profits.

== See also ==
- Avicide
- Berne Convention on the Conservation of European Wildlife and Natural Habitats
- Bird Protection Quebec
- BirdLife International
- Bird-skyscraper collisions
- Climate change and birds
- Fundación ProAves
- Hawaiian honeycreeper conservation
- International Convention on the Protection of Birds
- Migratory Bird Treaty
- The Institute for Bird Populations
- Raptor conservation
- Royal Australasian Ornithologists Union
- SOS/BirdLife Slovakia
