= Rakesh Khatri =

Indian environmentalist

Rakesh Khatri is an Indian environmentalist known for his work in bird conservation, particularly through the creation of bird nests. Khatri's work has focused primarily on increasing awareness and implementing measures to protect bird species, especially the house sparrow.

Khatri began his bird conservation efforts in 2008. His initial project involved constructing nests for house sparrows, a species experiencing a decline in urban areas. He founded the Eco Roots Foundation, an organization dedicated to educating the public about birds and promoting the creation of bird-friendly environments. The foundation claims to have constructed over 9.18.000 nests to date.
