= International Convention on the Protection of Birds =

1950 animal welfare treaty between European countries

Signed and ratified
Acceded or succeeded
Not signed
- Signed: 18 October 1950
- Location: Paris
- Effective: 17 January 1963
- Condition: 6 ratifications + 90 days
- Expiration: Never
- Signatories: 13
- Parties: 13
- Depositary: France
- Language: French

The International Convention on the Protection of Birds (French: Convention internationale sur la protection (des) oiseaux) is an animal welfare treaty signed in Paris on 18 October 1950, ratified in 1953 by Austria, France, Greece and Monaco, and entered into effect on 17 January 1963 for 13 European countries. It followed the International Convention for the Protection of Birds that are Useful for Agriculture that was signed in Paris on 19 March 1902 (which remains effective, but has been rendered completely obsolete by later treaties), to extend to all species of birds. The text of the treaty was modified for the first time on 1 September 1973, and a second time on 30 March 2016.

The Convention established the principle that all birds, except for a small number of species, must be protected. It does not contain a list of species entitled to protection. Parties are required to maintain closed seasons for game birds (mostly during the spring migration), comply with certain hunting method regulations, and encouraged to establish bird reserves.

According to the then-Governor of the International Council of Environmental Law Cyril de Klemm (1989), the Convention "has been largely ineffective", mostly due to the relatively small number of countries that have ratified it. Instead, the Berne Convention on the Conservation of European Wildlife and Natural Habitats (signed in 1979, effective in 1982) had become the "main international instrument for the protection for European birds".

== See also ==
- Agreement on the Conservation of Albatrosses and Petrels
- Animal rights by country or territory
- Bird conservation
- List of international animal welfare conventions
- Migratory Bird Treaty between Canada and the United States
