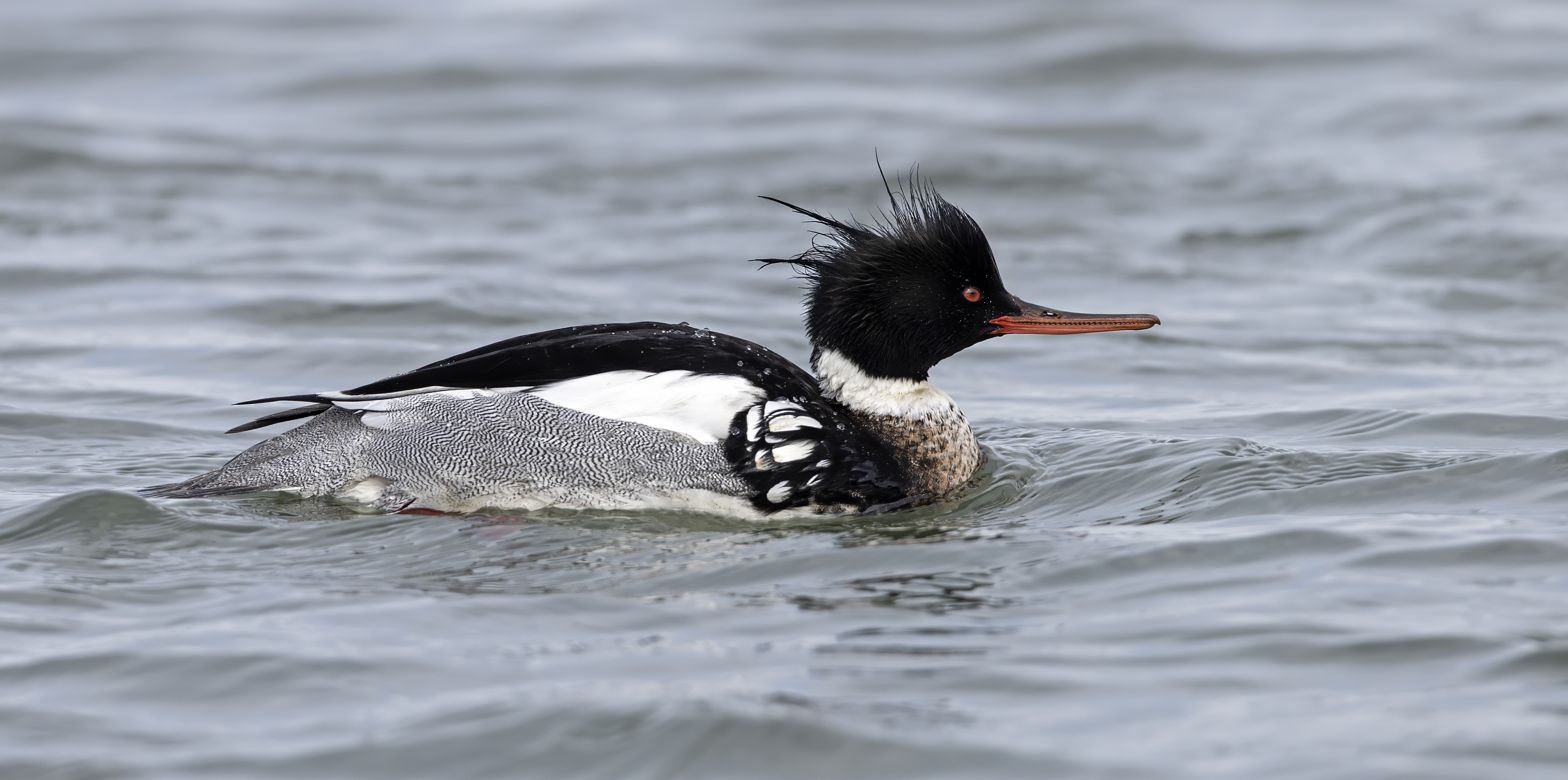
- Male in winter, New Jersey, US
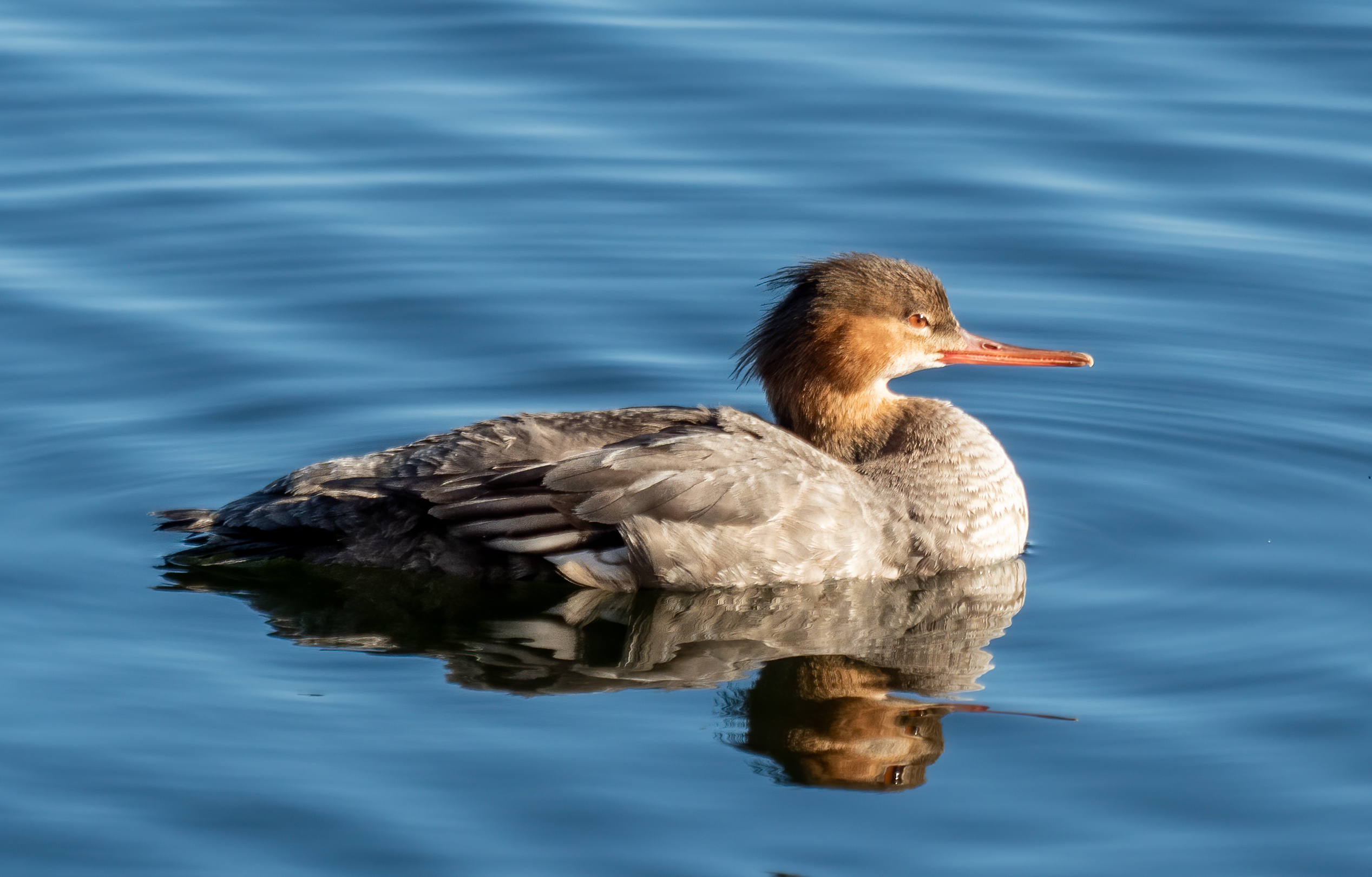
- Female, New York, US

Conservation status
- Least Concern (IUCN 3.1)

Scientific classification
- Kingdom: Animalia
- Phylum: Chordata
- Class: Aves
- Order: Anseriformes
- Family: Anatidae
- Genus: Mergus
- Species: M. serrator

Binomial name
- Mergus serrator Linnaeus, 1758
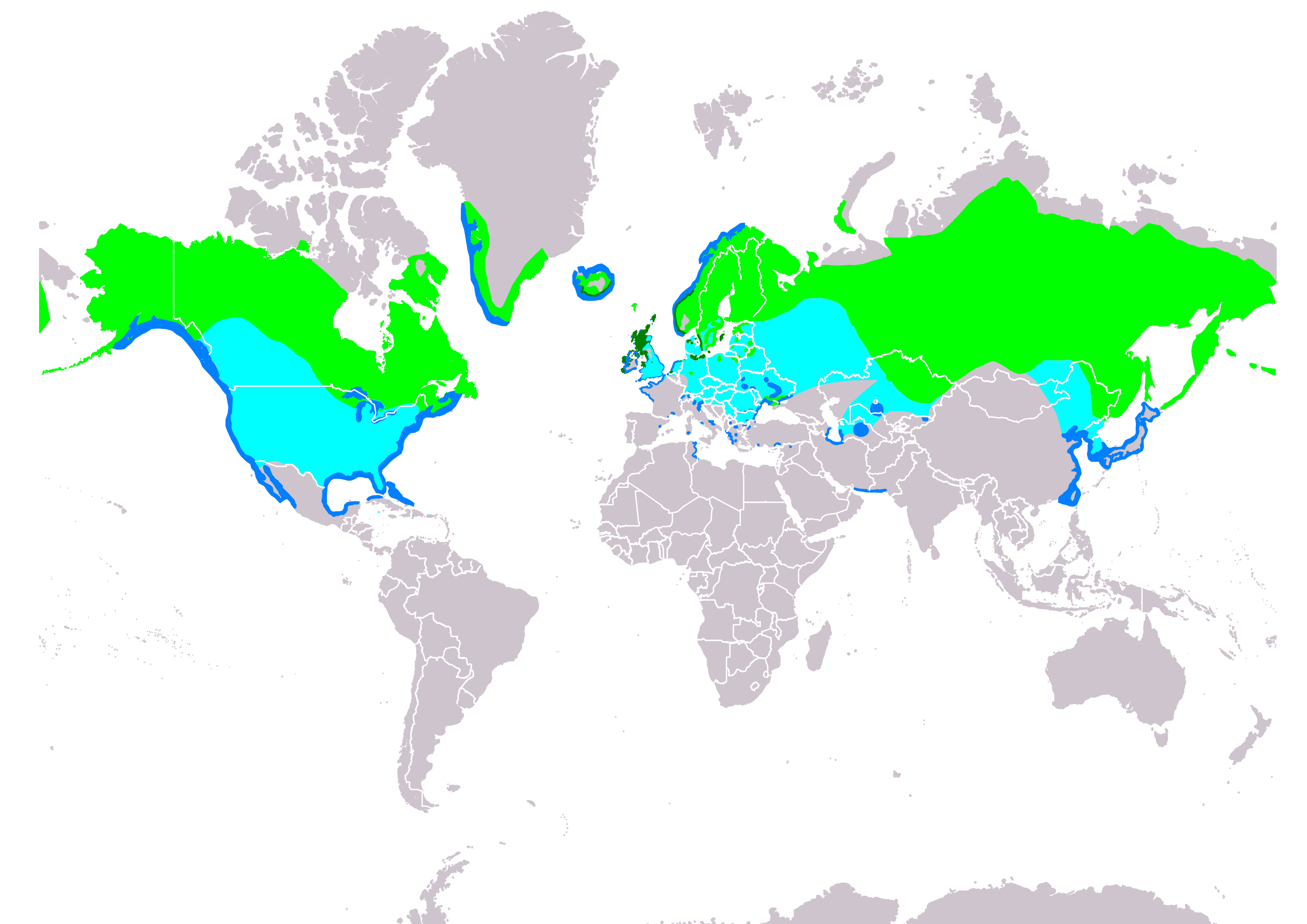
- Red-breasted merganser range Breeding Resident Non-breeding Passage

Synonyms
- Merganser serrator (Linnaeus, 1758)

= Red-breasted merganser =

Red-breasted merganser Temporal range: Pleistocene–present

Species of bird

The red-breasted merganser (Mergus serrator) is a duck species that is native to much of the temperate to subarctic Northern Hemisphere. The red breast that gives the species its common name is only displayed by males in breeding plumage. Individuals fly rapidly, and feed by diving from the surface to pursue aquatic animals underwater, using serrated bills to capture slippery fish. They migrate each year from breeding sites on lakes and rivers to their mostly coastal wintering areas, making them the most frequent species in the genus Mergus to frequent saltwater regularly. The worldwide population of this species is stable, though it is threatened in some areas by habitat loss and other factors.

Males have a bottle green head with a double crest and females have a rusty head with a white fore neck and chin.

== Taxonomy ==
The red-breasted merganser was formally described in 1758 by the Swedish naturalist Carl Linnaeus in the tenth edition of his Systema Naturae under the current binomial name Mergus serrator. The species is monotypic; no subspecies are recognised. Birds breeding in Greenland were sometimes distinguised as a subspecies M. s. schioleri in the past on the basis of averaging very marginally larger, but this is no longer accepted as distinct.

=== Etymology ===
The genus name Mergus is a Latin word used by Pliny and other Roman authors to refer to an unspecified water bird. The specific epithet serrator is Latin for sawyer and is ultimately from serra, meaning saw. It refers to the saw-like projections on the bird's bill, which enable it to hold on to slippery fish, its most frequent prey.

== Description ==
The adult red-breasted merganser is 51–64 cm (20–25 in) long, has a wingspan of 66–74 cm (26–29 in). Males average slightly larger, weighing 950–1,350 g (34–48 oz), compared to female weight of 800–1,100 g (28–39 oz).

It has a spiky crest and long thin red bill with serrated edges. The male has a dark head with a green sheen, a white neck with a rusty breast, a black back, and white underparts. Adult females have a rusty head and a greyish-brown body. Juveniles look similar to females, but have a shorter crest, and marginally smaller white wing patches.

The range of the red-breasted merganser broadly overlaps with that of the similar and closely related common merganser. The two species can therefore occur in the same place at the same time, though the species often choose different habitats (red-breasted prefers saltwater, common prefers freshwater, but overlap is frequent). Breeding male plumages are fairly distinctive, but other plumages such as those borne by females, immatures, and non-breeding males can make the two species hard to distinguish. Female common merganser has more contrast between the darker head and lighter breast, and has a light chin patch not seen on the red-breasted.

=== Voice ===
During courtship, the female gives a rasping prrak prrak, while the male gives a catlike meow. In flight, the female makes a harsh gruk. At other times this species is largely silent.

== Behaviour ==
The red-breasted merganser has been noted for its fast flight speed. In a flush of a group by an airplane, a male was clocked at 80 mph (130 km/h) airspeed, 100 mph (160 km/h) over land.

=== Display ===
Male red-breasted mergansers show a highly stereotypic metronomic courtship display, in which they stretch, bend and contract their necks, often in synchrony by several males together, showing their crests alternately fanned and straight; females watch from nearby to select their preferred mate, and often chase or even attack the males. Display, which takes place while swimming, starts in mid November, and continues until June or rarely July.

=== Food and feeding ===
The red-breasted merganser dives and swims underwater. It mainly eats small fish, but also consumes aquatic insects, worms, crustaceans, and amphibians.

=== Breeding ===
Its breeding habitat is freshwater lakes and rivers across northern North America, Greenland, Europe, and the Palearctic. It nests in sheltered locations on the ground near water, often, but far from always, close to estuaries or sea coasts. The eggs measure 5.8–6.8 cm (2.3–2.7 in) in length and 4.3–4.7 cm (1.7–1.9 in) in width. Incubation takes 28 to 35 days. After hatching, young leave the nest within 24 hours.

=== Migration ===
It is mostly migratory and northern breeders winter in coastal waters further south. Populations in parts of northwestern Europe with oceanic climates (Iceland, Ireland, Britain, Norway, and Baltic Sea islands) are largely resident or disperse only short distances. Outside of the breeding season, it forms flocks, which tend to be smaller during spring migration than they are in autumn migration and in winter.

== Conservation ==
The red-breasted merganser is one of the species to which the Agreement on the Conservation of African-Eurasian Migratory Waterbirds (AEWA) applies. The species is also considered a game bird under the Migratory Bird Treaty between the United States and Canada. This means that the species gets some protection, though hunting it is legal in North America in certain seasons and places determined by local hunting regulations. However, few hunters are interested in the species and relatively few birds are harvested.

The species is widespread and common enough to be given conservation status of least concern by the IUCN, though populations in some areas may be declining. Threats include habitat loss through wetland destruction, exposure to toxins such as pesticides and lead, and becoming bycatch of commercial fishing operations. Anglers and fish farmers have also persecuted the species, which they regard as a competitor, though the impact of this on the species' population overall is not known; illegal persecution by fisheries interests is significant in Britain, particularly Scotland.

== Gallery ==
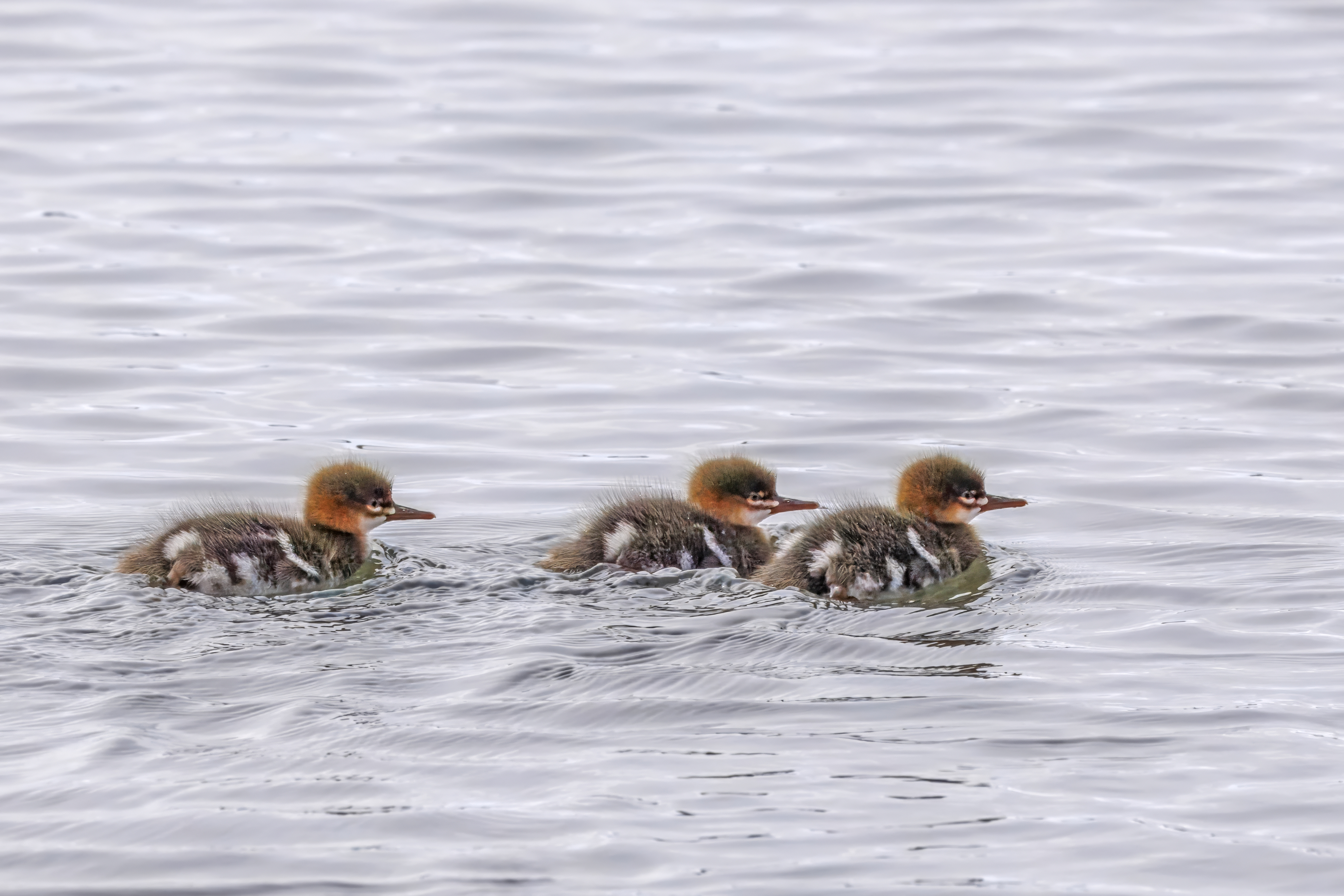
Chicks in Iceland

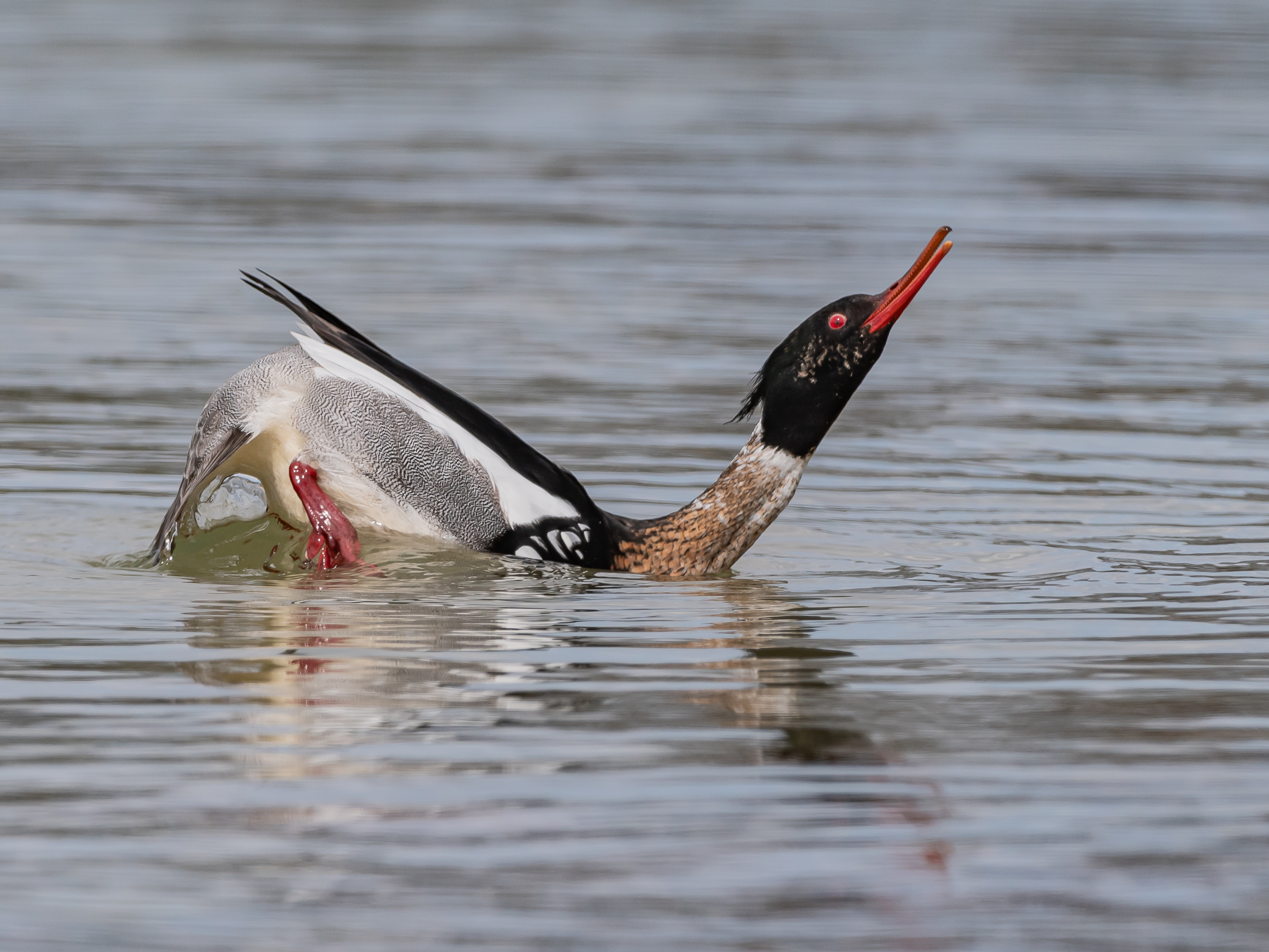
Male in display posture, Baltic Sea coast of Germany

Courtship display, Illinois, US

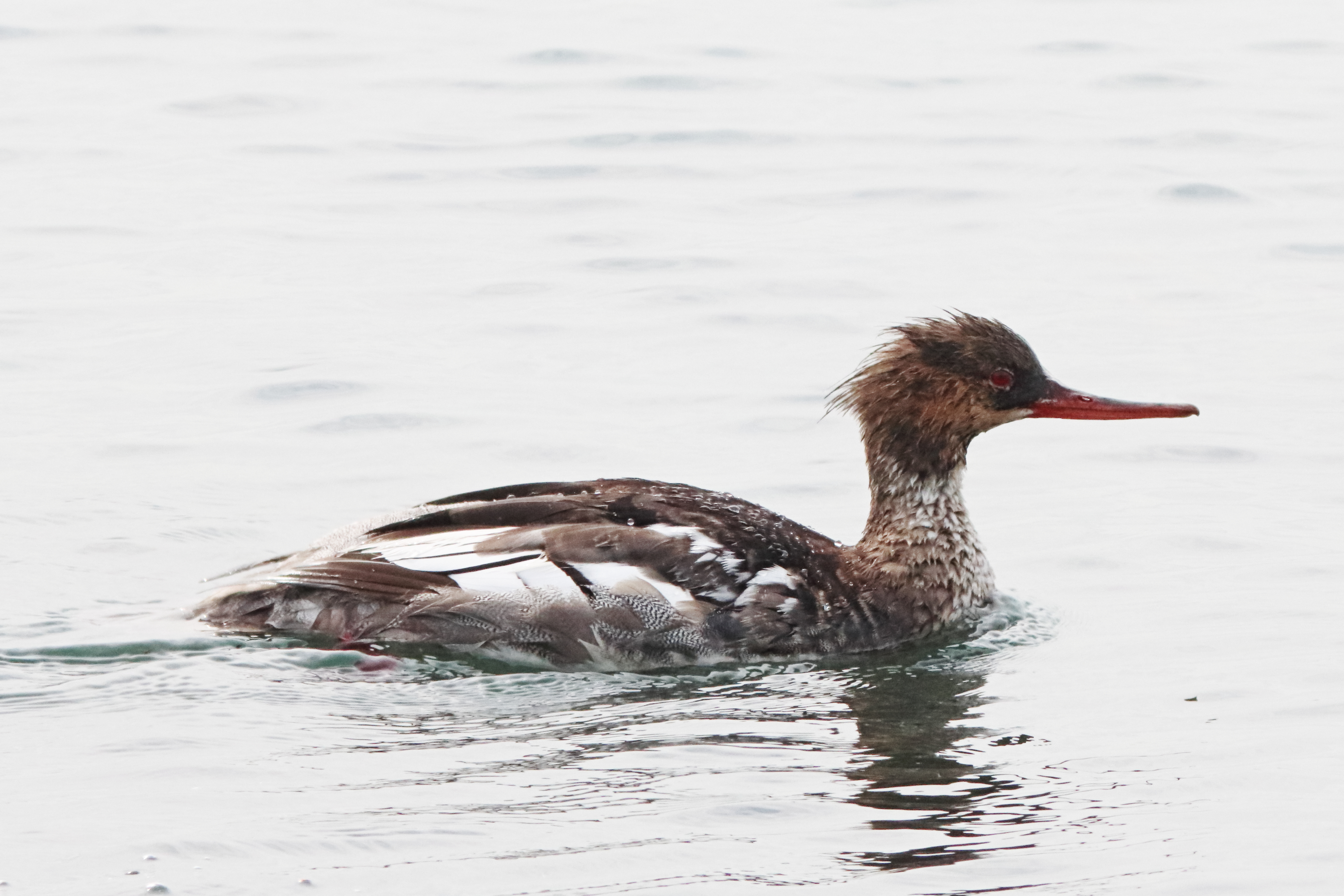
Male in eclipse plumage, Cemlyn, Wales

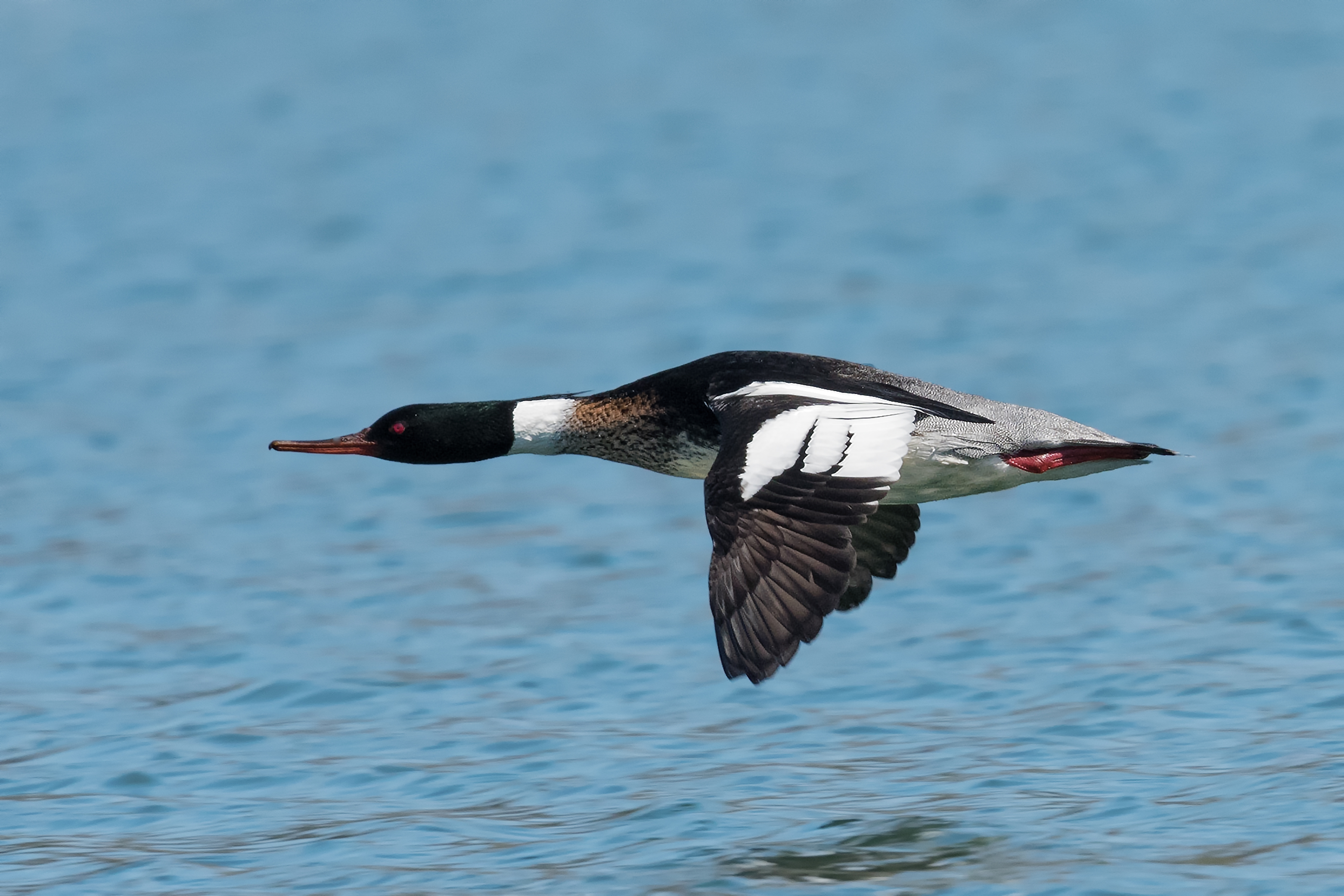
Male in flight, New Jersey, US

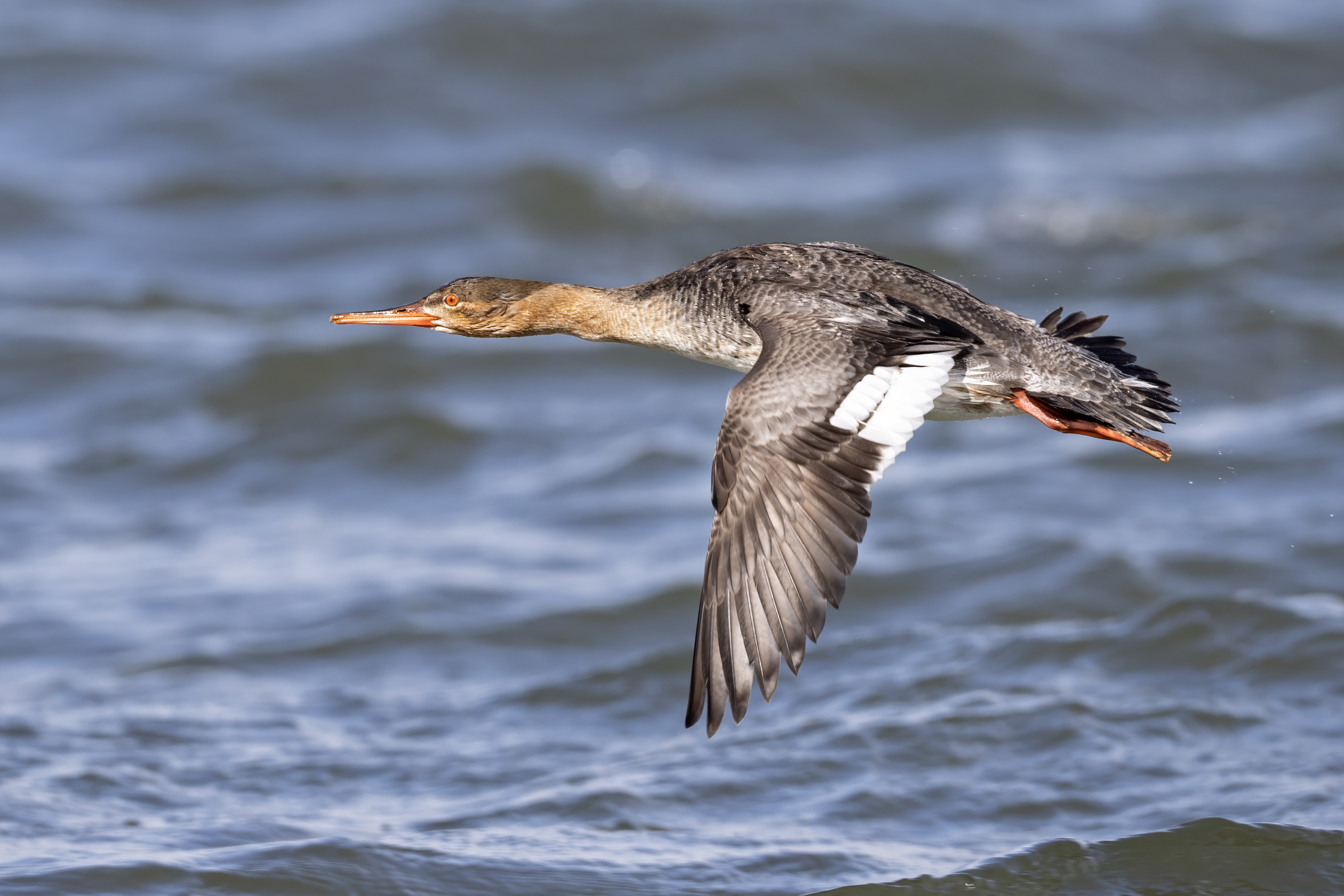
Female in flight, New Jersey, US

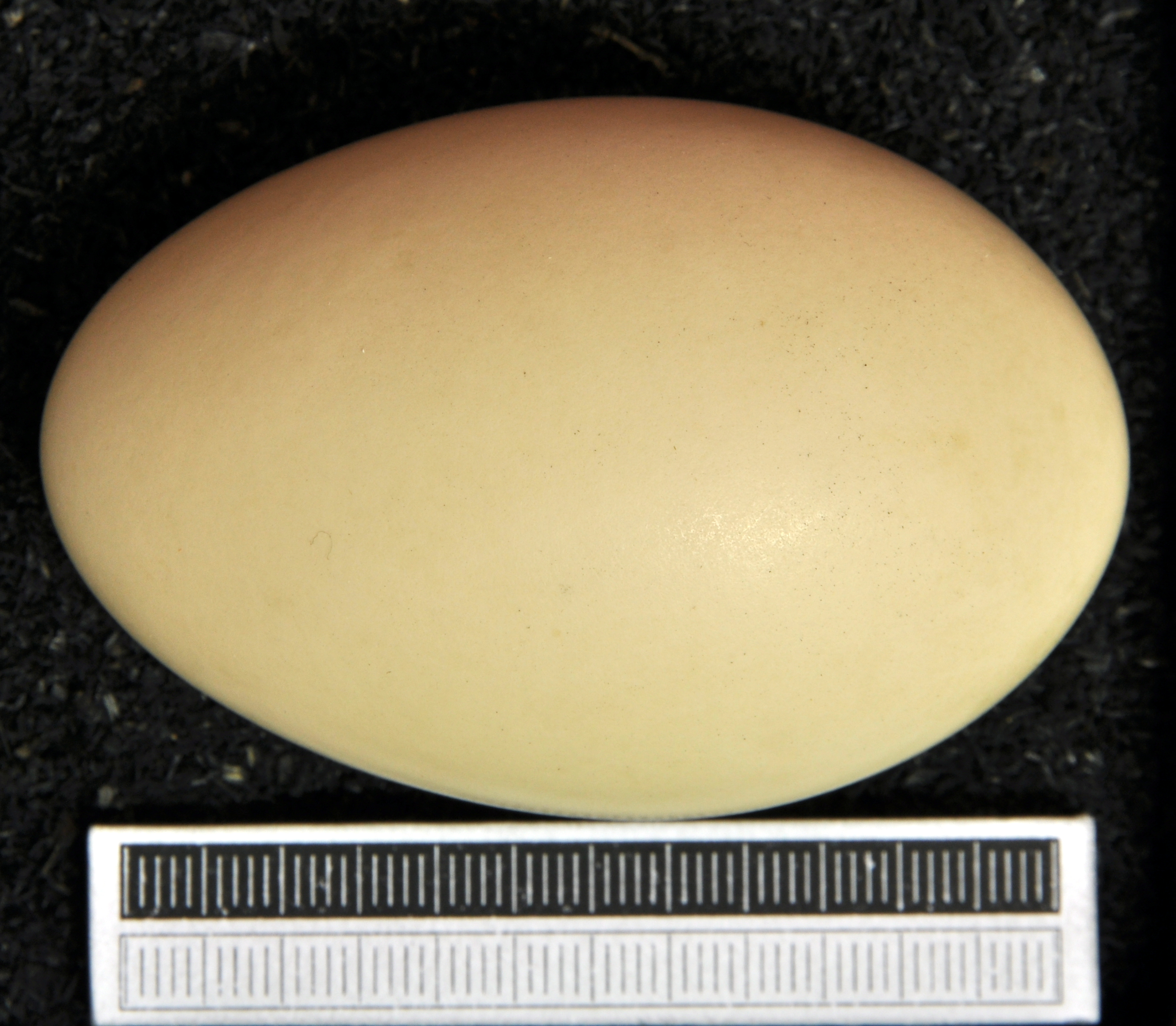
Egg, Collection Museum Wiesbaden
