= Llanfigael =

Village in Anglesey, Wales

Coordinates: 53.3207°N 4.5095°W

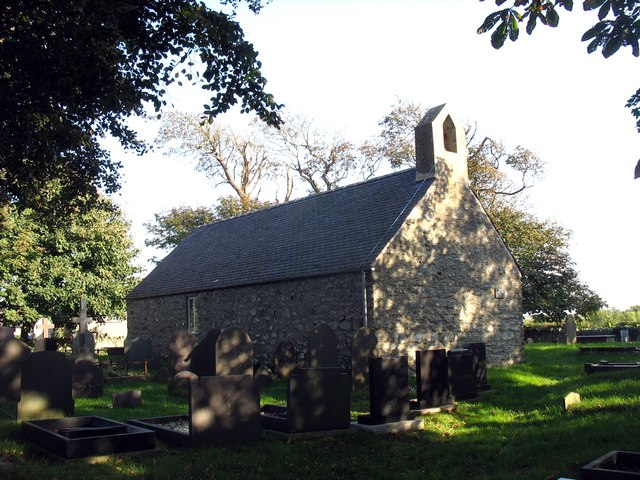
- Llanfigael Church

- Location within Anglesey
- Community: Llanfachraeth
- Principal area: Isle of Anglesey
- Country: Wales
- Sovereign state: United Kingdom
- Police: North Wales
- Fire: North Wales
- Ambulance: Welsh
- UK Parliament: Ynys Môn
- Senedd Cymru – Welsh Parliament: Bangor Conwy Môn

Llanfigael, or Llanfigel (also sometimes Llanfigail or Llanfugail), is a village in Anglesey, in north-west Wales, in the community of Llanfachraeth.

The redundant church known as St Figael's (or St Bigail's) as has been designated by Cadw as a Grade II listed building and is under the care of the Friends of Friendless Churches.
