= Stryd-y-Facsen =

Hamlet in Anglesey, Wales

Coordinates: 53.324881°N 4.507134°W

- Location within Anglesey
- OS grid reference: SH 3312 8381
  - Cardiff: 139.2 mi (224.0 km)
  - London: 223.1 mi (359.0 km)
- Community: Llanfachraeth
- Principal area: Anglesey
- Country: Wales
- Sovereign state: United Kingdom
- Post town: Holyhead
- Police: North Wales
- Fire: North Wales
- Ambulance: Welsh
- UK Parliament: Ynys Môn
- Senedd Cymru – Welsh Parliament: Ynys Môn

Stryd-y-Facsen is a hamlet in the community of Llanfachraeth, Anglesey, Wales, which is 139.2 miles (224 km) from Cardiff and 223.1 miles (359.1 km) from London.

== See also ==
- List of localities in Wales by population
