= Berne Convention on the Conservation of European Wildlife and Natural Habitats =

1979 environmental treaty

Bern Convention or Berne Convention
Convention on the Conservation of European Wildlife and Natural Habitats
- Signed: 19 September 1979
- Location: Bern
- Effective: 1 June 1982
- Condition: 5 ratifications
- Parties: 50 states + EU
- Depositary: Council of Europe
- Language: English, French, Italian, Russian and German
- www.coe.int/en/web/bern-convention

The Bern Convention on the Conservation of European Wildlife and Natural Habitats, also known as the Bern Convention (or Berne Convention), is a binding international legal instrument in the field of Nature Conservation, it covers the natural heritage in Europe, as well as in some African countries. The Convention was open for signature on 19 September 1979 and came into force on 1 June 1982. It is particularly concerned about protecting natural habitats and endangered species, including migratory species.

== Aims and objectives ==
The convention has three main aims, which are stated in Article 1:

- to conserve wild flora and fauna and their natural habitats
- to promote cooperation between states
- to give particular attention to endangered and vulnerable species including endangered and vulnerable migratory species

== Structure ==
Treaty text of the Berne Convention

The convention is divided into:

Preamble
Because this convention has a special nature, which is to include the maximum number of signatures possible, it included the eventual signing by non-members of the Council of Europe: "the member States of the Council of Europe and the other signatories hereto, Considering that the aim of the Council of Europe is to achieve a greater unity between its members,..."
Chapter I – General provisions
This chapter contains three articles, where it is stated the three aims of the Convention and general obligations of the Contracting Parties.
Chapter II – Protection of habitats
Here are set out the obligations of the Contracting Parties concerning the conservation of the habitats.
Chapter III – Protection of species
This chapter contains the obligations of the Contracting Parties regarding the Appendices I, II, III and IV and the exceptions of these obligations.
Chapter IV – Special provisions for migratory species
This chapter contains the obligations of the Contracting Parties regarding migratory species.
Chapter V – Supplementary provisions
This chapter contains supplementary obligations of the Contracting Parties, concerning co-operation, research, reintroduction and introduction of species.
Chapter VI – Standing Committee
This chapter settles the functioning procedure of the Standing Committee and their tasks.
Chapter VII – Amendments
This chapter contains the procedure of amendments regarding articles and Appendices of the Convention.
Chapter VIII – Settlement of disputes
This chapter contains the procedure of the arbitration of any disputes that could arise between Contracting Parties.
Chapter IX – Final provisions
This chapter contains the final arrangements of the Convention.
Appendices
Four appendices set out particular species for protection. They are regularly updated by the Standing Committee, who are advised by a number of Expert Groups:
- Appendix I – Strictly protected flora species
- Appendix II – Strictly protected fauna species
- Appendix III – Protected fauna species
- Appendix IV – Prohibited means and methods of killing, capture and other exploitation

== Ratifying states ==
Participation in the Bern Convention: Signed and ratified Acceded or succeeded Only signed Not signed (CoE member states) Not signed (non-CoE member states)

Member States of the Council of Europe, status as of 15 February 2022.

State	Signature	Ratification	Entry into force
Albania	31 October 1995	13 January 1999	1 May 1999
Andorra	11 May 2000	13 October 2000	1 February 2001
Armenia	13 March 2006	14 April 2008	1 August 2008
Austria	19 September 1979	2 May 1983	1 September 1983
Azerbaijan		28 March 2000 a	1 July 2000
Belgium	19 September 1979	24 August 1990	1 December 1990
Bosnia and Herzegovina	17 November 2008	17 November 2008	1 March 2009
Bulgaria		31 January 1991 a	1 May 1991
Croatia	3 November 1999	3 July 2000	1 November 2000
Cyprus	21 October 1981	16 May 1988	1 September 1988
Czech Republic	8 October 1997	25 February 1998	1 June 1998
Denmark	19 September 1979	8 September 1982	1 January 1983
Estonia		3 August 1992 a	1 December 1992
Finland	19 September 1979	9 December 1985	1 April 1986
France	19 September 1979	26 April 1990	1 August 1990
Georgia	18 May 2009	19 November 2009	1 March 2010
Germany	19 September 1979	13 December 1984	1 April 1985
Greece	19 September 1979	13 June 1983	1 October 1983
Hungary		16 November 1989 a	1 March 1990
Iceland	17 June 1993	17 June 1993	1 October 1993
Ireland	19 September 1979	23 April 1982	1 August 1982
Italy	19 September 1979	11 February 1982	1 June 1982
Latvia	23 January 1997	23 January 1997	1 May 1997
Liechtenstein	19 September 1979	30 October 1980	1 June 1982
Lithuania	28 September 1994	5 September 1996	1 January 1997
Luxembourg	19 September 1979	23 March 1982	1 July 1982
Malta	26 November 1993	26 November 1993	1 March 1994
Moldova		24 May 1994 a	1 September 1994
Monaco	7 February 1994 a	1 June 1994	
Montenegro	3 March 2009	1 October 2009	1 February 2010
Netherlands	19 September 1979	28 October 1980	1 June 1982
Norway	19 September 1979	27 May 1986	1 September 1986
Poland	24 March 1995	13 September 1995	1 January 1996
Portugal	19 September 1979	3 February 1982	1 June 1982
Romania		18 May 1993 a	1 September 1993
Serbia	9 January 2008	9 January 2008	1 May 2008
Slovakia	28 April 1994	23 September 1996	1 January 1997
Slovenia	20 October 1998	29 September 1999	1 January 2000
Spain	19 September 1979	27 May 1986	1 September 1986
Sweden	19 September 1979	14 June 1983	1 October 1983
Switzerland	19 September 1979	12 March 1981	1 June 1982
Republic of Macedonia	17 December 1998	17 December 1998	1 April 1999
Turkey	19 September 1979	2 May 1984	1 September 1984
Ukraine	17 August 1998	5 January 1999	1 May 1999
United Kingdom	19 September 1979	28 May 1982	1 September 1982

States not members of the Council of Europe

State	Signature	Ratification	Entry into force
Belarus		19 February 2013 a	1 June 2013
Burkina Faso		14 June 1990 a	1 October 1990
Morocco		25 April 2001 a	1 August 2001
Senegal		13 April 1987 a	1 August 1987
Tunisia		12 January 1996 a	1 May 1996

International Organisations

Organisations	Signature	Ratification	Entry into force
European Union	19 September 1979	7 May 1982	1 September 1982

Algeria, Cape Verde, the Holy See, San Marino and Russia are among non-signatories that have observer status at meetings of the committee.

The convention led to the creation in 1998 of the Emerald network of Areas of Special Conservation Interest (ASCIs) throughout the territory of the parties to the convention, which operates alongside the European Union's Natura 2000 programme.

=== Duties of contracting parties ===
All countries that have signed the convention must:

- promote national conservation policies
- promote measures against pollution
- promote educational and informative measures
- co-ordinate efforts to protect migratory species
- establish legislative and administrative measures

== Monitoring the implementation of the convention ==
To achieve successfully the aims of this Convention, a number of monitoring devices were implemented.

=== Reporting system ===
- Compulsory biannual reports
- Voluntary general reports (every four years)
- Legal reports (one country per year)
- National reports
- Follow-up of recommendations

=== Groups of experts ===
The chosen experts are in charge of monitoring the implementation of the Standing Committee recommendation regarding species and habitats, as well as doing their own recommendations about specific conservation problems.

=== Case-file system ===
The system is based in complaints for possible non-compliance or other problems related with the provisions of the Convention. These complaints are processed by the Secretariat, the Bureau and the Standing Committee and when they feel there is the need for further information, on-the-spot visits by independent experts can be arranged.

== See also ==
- Animal rights by country or territory
- Biogeographic regions of Europe
- Environmental agreements
- International Convention on the Protection of Birds
- International Union for Conservation of Nature
- List of international animal welfare conventions
- Migratory Bird Treaty
- Red Data Book of the Russian Federation
- List of Council of Europe treaties
