= SOS/BirdLife Slovakia =

Slovakian ornithological conservation organization

Slovak Ornithological Society/BirdLife Slovakia (Slovak: Slovenská ornitologická spoločnosť/BirdLife Slovensko) is the main bird conservation charity in Slovakia. SOS/BirdLife Slovakia was founded in 2006. It is a direct descendant of the Czechoslovak Society for Ornithology which was founded in 1926. SOS/BirdLife Slovakia has more than 1,000 members and a staff of 10. It is the Slovak representative in the BirdLife International partnership.

The SOS/BirdLife Slovakia is campaigning to have all Important Bird Areas in the country given EU Special Protection Area status. It also collects bird data and organizes censuses of birds (Common Bird Census, Waterbird Census, voluntary bird monitoring of IBAs and another schemes).

SOS/BirdLife Slovakia is active in protection of IBAs. It bought more than 80 ha of wetlands in IBA/SPA Senne, which is the most important breeding site for some waterbirds in the Slovakia (for instance Eurasian spoonbills) and the most important stopover for migrating waders in Slovakia. Besides that, SOS/BirdLife Slovakia leased more than 150 ha of taiga forest in northern Slovakia in IBA/SPA Horná Orava, which is an important site for breeding black storks.
