= St Figael's Church, Llanfigael =

Coordinates: 53.3158°N 4.5114°W

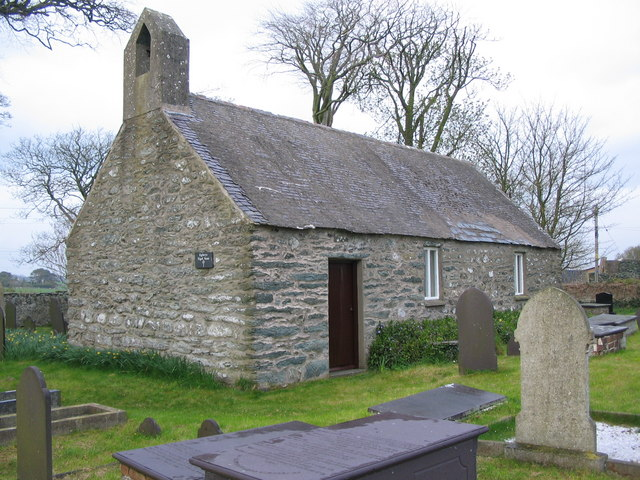
- St Figael's Church, Llanfigael, from the southwest

- Location in Anglesey
- OS grid reference: SH 327 828
- Location: Llanfigael, Anglesey
- Country: Wales
- Denomination: Church in Wales
- Website: Friends of Friendless Churches

History
- Status: Parish church
- Founded: Before 1254
- Dedication: Saint Figael

Architecture
- Functional status: Redundant
- Heritage designation: Grade II
- Designated: 5 April 1971
- Architectural type: Church

Specifications
- Materials: Stone

St Figael's Church, is a redundant church in the hamlet of Llanfigael, Anglesey, Wales. It has been designated by Cadw as a Grade II listed building, and is under the care of the Friends of Friendless Churches. The church is considered by Cadw to be particularly notable because of its "retaining its early 19th-century interior virtually intact".

== History ==
The present church is thought to date from the 18th century, and it was much rebuilt in 1841. A church has been documented on this site since 1254. The only fabric possibly surviving from this earlier church is to be found in the foundations and part of the walls. Since it was declared redundant, the charity the Friends of Friendless Churches has held a 999-year lease, which was transferred to them on 1 February 2007. After taking it over, the charity has organised the re-covering of the roof, and has re-introduced timber windows designed by Tim Ratcliffe, their design being based on the pre-existing windows.

== Architecture ==
It is a small rectangular church constructed in stone rubble. At the west end is a gabled rendered bellcote. The doorway is at the west end of the south side, and there is no chancel. The fittings are thought to date from the 19th century. The pulpit is on the north side of the church; elsewhere there are box pews and benches. At the west end are three fonts; the oldest dates from the 12th century, and was formerly in the church of St Ynghenedl; the next dates from the 14th century, and is octagonal in shape; while the third is a "rare cupboard font".
