= Migratory Bird Treaty =

1916 treaty between Canada and the United States

Convention Between the United States and Great Britain for the Protection of Migratory Birds
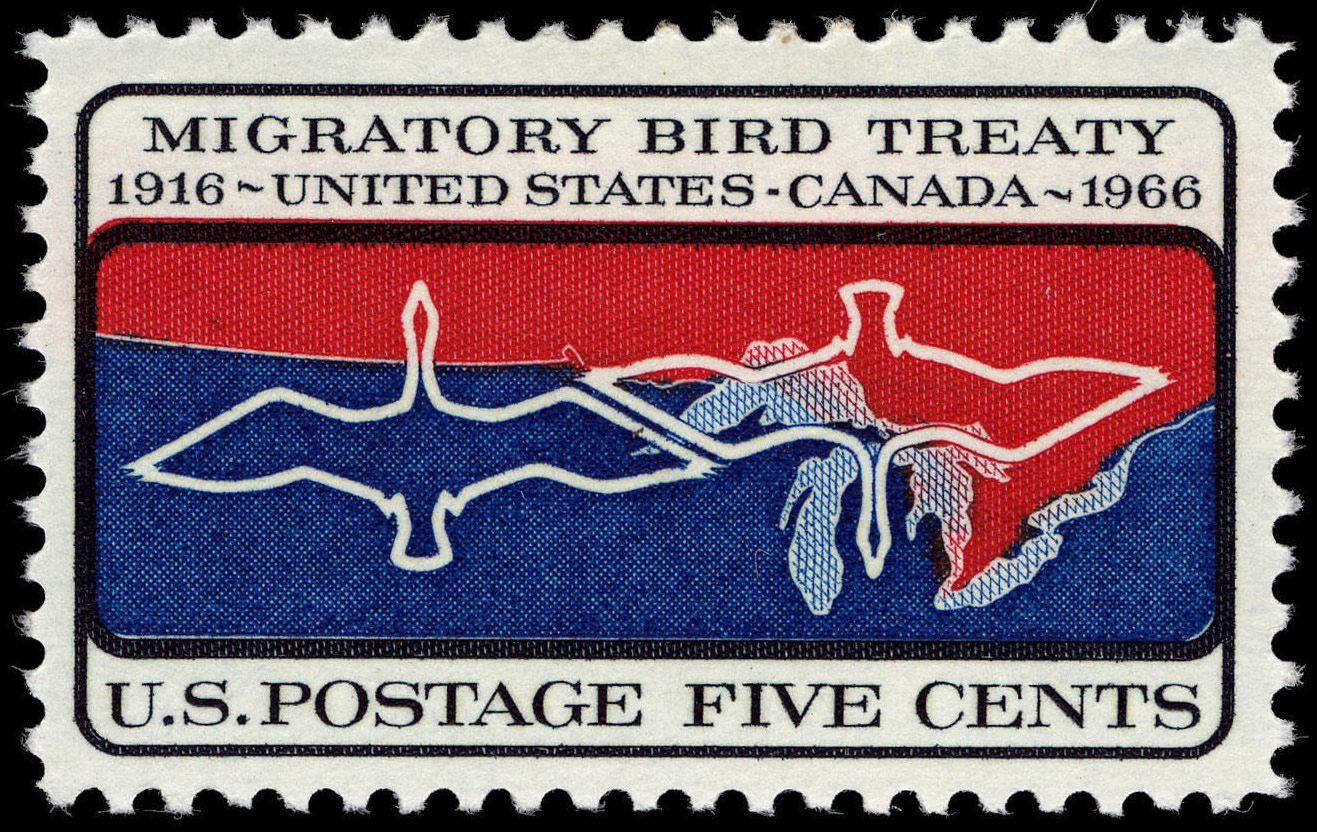
- United States stamp commemorating the treaty
- Type: Bird conservation
- Signed: 16 August 1916
- Location: Washington, D.C., United States
- Effective: 7 December 1916
- Parties: Great Britain; United States
- Language: English

The Migratory Bird Treaty or Convention is an environmental treaty between Canada and the United States. It was originally signed on 16 August 1916 by the United States and the United Kingdom (representing Canada), entered into force on 6 December 1916 and has since been amended several times.

Whereas, many species of birds in the course of their annual migrations traverse certain parts of the Dominion of Canada and the United States; and

Whereas, many of these species are of great value as a source of food or in destroying insects which are injurious to forests and forage plants on the public domain, as well as to agricultural crops, in both Canada and the United States, but are nevertheless in danger of extermination through lack of adequate protection during the nesting season or while on their way to and from their breeding grounds;

His Majesty the King of the United Kingdom of Great Britain and Ireland and of the British dominions beyond the seas, Emperor of India, and the United States of America, being desirous of saving from indiscriminate slaughter and of insuring the preservation of such migratory birds as are either useful to man or are harmless, have resolved to adopt some uniform system of protection which shall effectively accomplish such objects ...

== Implementation ==
This treaty led to important environmental legislation being passed in each of the two countries in order to implement the terms of the treaty.

=== Implementation in Canada ===
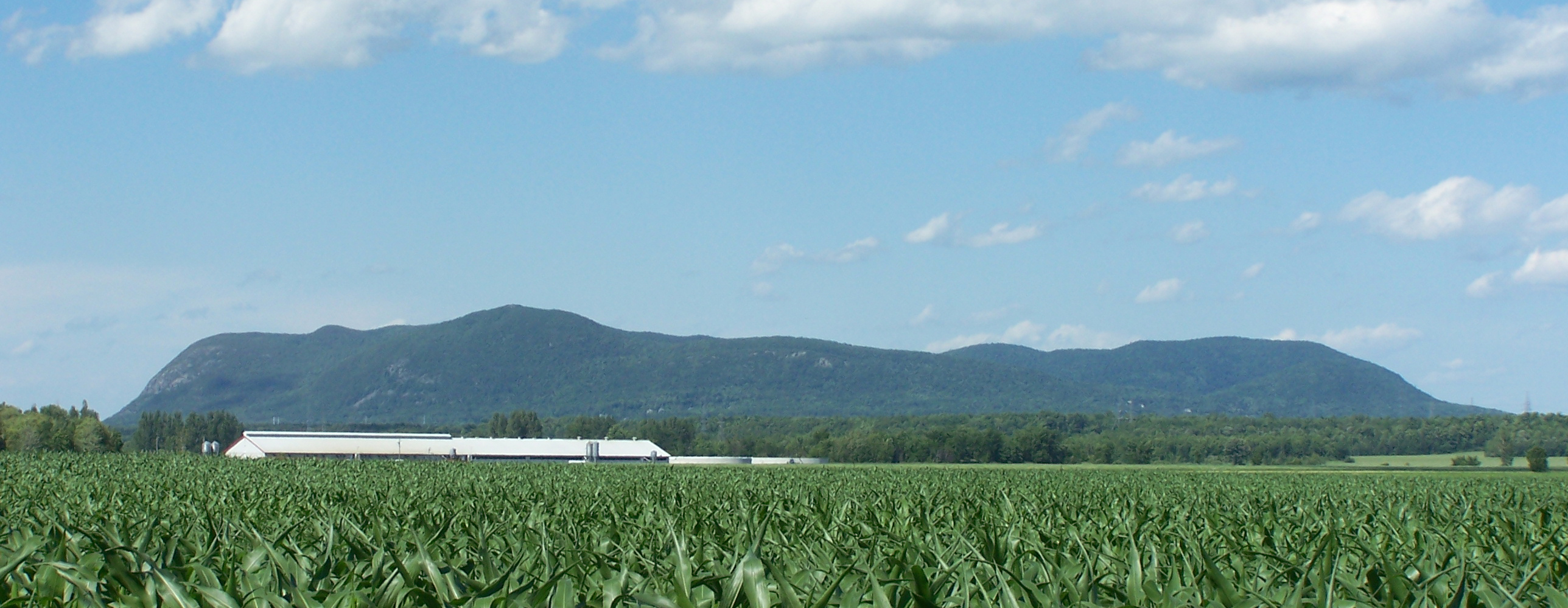
Mont Saint-Hilaire in southern Quebec was made a Migratory Bird Sanctuary in 1960

The Migratory Birds Convention Act (also MBCA) is a Canadian law established in 1917 and significantly updated in June 1994 which contains regulations to protect migratory birds, their eggs, and their nests from hunting, trafficking and commercialization. A permit is required to engage in any of these activities. One major outcome of the act was the creation of Federal Migratory Bird Sanctuaries (MBSs).

=== Implementation in the United States ===
Under United States Code Title 16, Chapter 7, Subchapter II, the Migratory Bird Treaty Act of 1918 is the United States legislation implementing the convention between the U.S. and Great Britain (for Canada). It replaced the Weeks-McLean Act, which had become effective in 1913 though faced constitutional challenges. The Migratory Bird Treaty Act was also challenged in the case Missouri v. Holland and the supremacy of ratified international treaties gave it additional protection. The United States subsequently entered into similar agreements with four other nations (Canada, Mexico, Japan and Russia) to protect migratory birds. The statute makes it unlawful to pursue, hunt, take, capture, kill or sell birds listed therein ("migratory birds"). The statute does not discriminate between live or dead birds and also grants full protection to any bird parts including feathers, eggs and nests. Over 800 species are currently on the list.

The statute is broken down into ten sections, 703 through 712 (16 U.S.C. 703 through 712). Note that § 709 is omitted, but § 709a Authorization of appropriations is included and active, making eleven listed sections (including § 709 Omitted).

== See also ==
- Bird Day
- International Convention on the Protection of Birds
