= Monkton Combe School =

Public school in Somerset, England

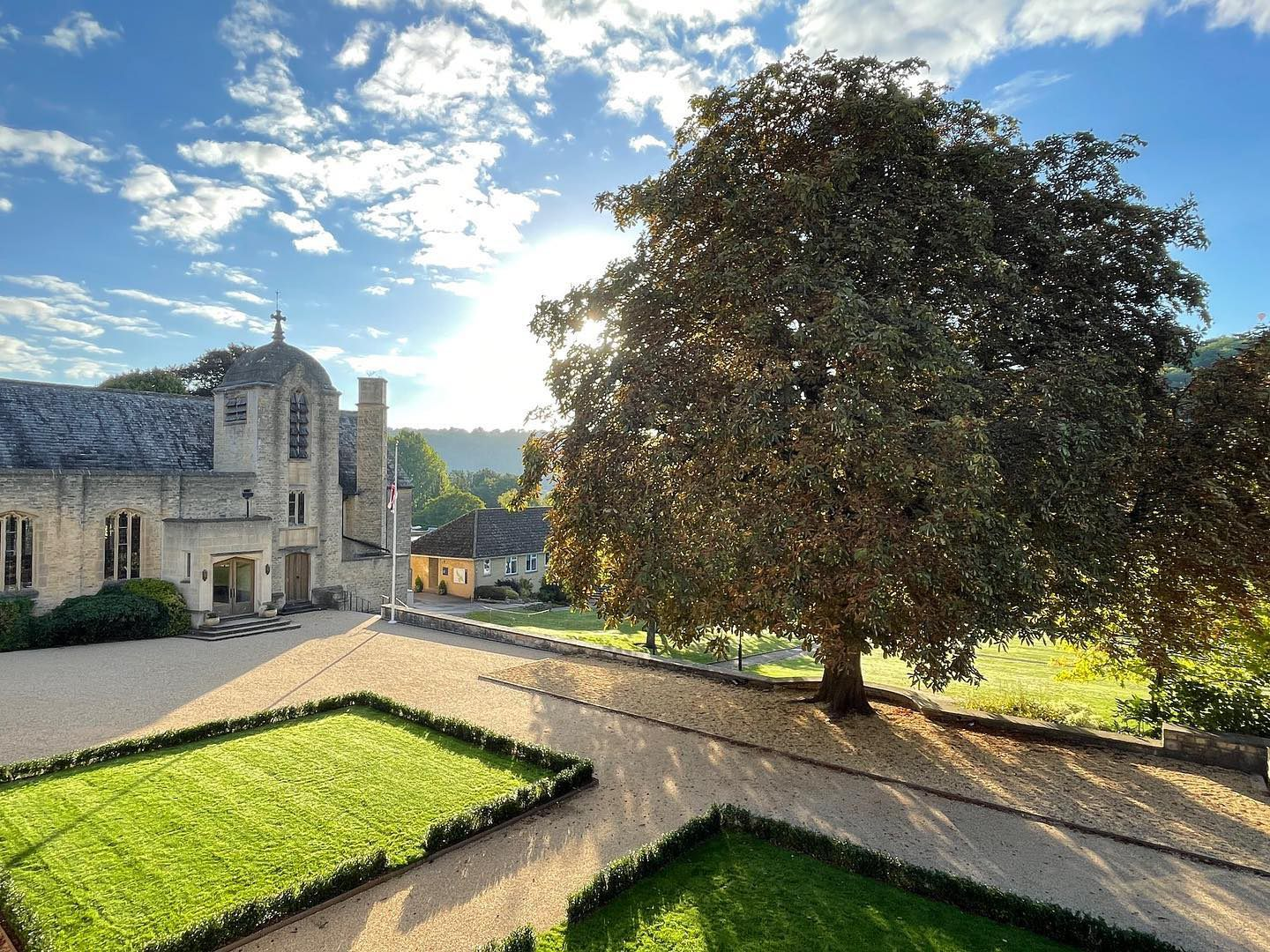
- Chapel Quad, Monkton Combe School

Location
- Monkton Combe, near Bath, Somerset, BA2 7HG; England; 51.3569°N 2.3270°W

Information
- Type: Public school Private boarding school
- Motto: Latin: Verbum Tuum Veritas (Thy Word is Truth)
- Established: 1868; 158 years ago
- Founder: The Revd Francis Pocock
- Head Master: Bradley Salisbury (principal), Catherine Winchcombe (Prep School)
- Gender: Coeducational
- Age: 2 to 18
- Enrolment: 711 (Senior, Prep and Pre-Prep)
- Houses: 6 Senior, 5 Prep
- Colours: Navy Blue & White
- Alumni: Old Monktonians
- Website: www.monktoncombeschool.com

Monkton Combe School is a public school (fee-charging boarding and day school), in the village of Monkton Combe near Bath in Somerset, England.

== History ==
Monkton Combe School was founded in 1868 by the Revd. Francis Pocock, vicar of Monkton Combe and a former curate to the Bishop of Sierra Leone .

Clarendon School for Girls, a former independent girls' school, merged with Monkton Combe School in 1992, at which point Monkton became fully coeducational.

Monkton is a member of the Rugby Group of independent boarding schools in the United Kingdom.

== Buildings and grounds ==
Several of the school's buildings are listed, including the main Senior school block known as The Old Farm, and the part of the Terrace Block known as The Old Vicarage.

The school has extensive grounds at both the Preparatory (prep) and Senior schools. The Senior cricket pitches (Longmead and Landham) are described as 'among the most picturesque in England', regularly featuring in the Wisden Cricket Calendar's ‘loveliest grounds’ lists.

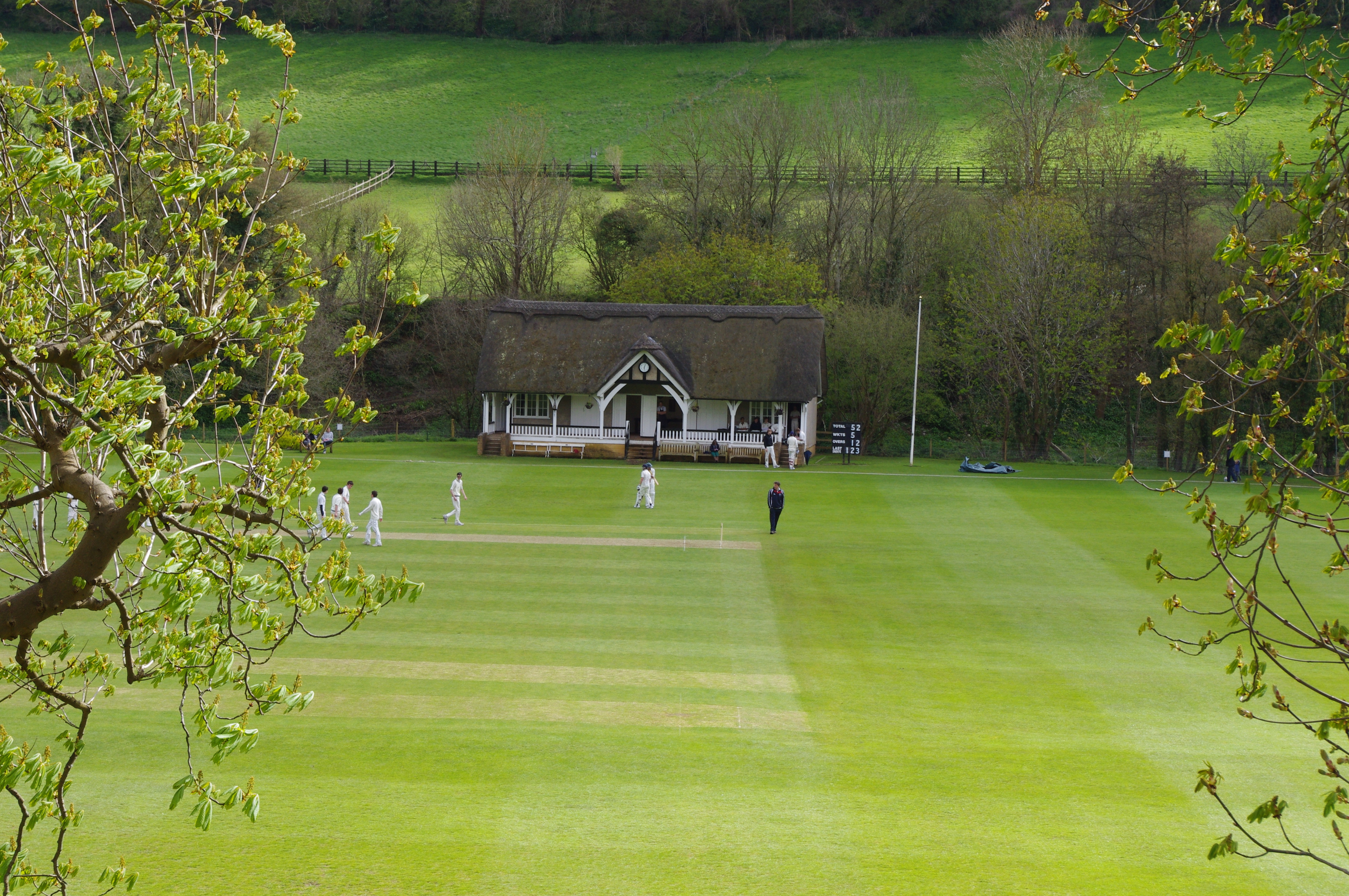
School Cricket Pitches at Longmead

The school has two boathouses, both on the River Avon. The older is on the edge of the Senior school grounds, sitting below the Dundas Aqueduct and is used mainly for junior rowing. In 2014 the school opened a new boathouse in the nearby village of Saltford. Students row as part of the Monkton Combe School Boat Club, with alumni racing under the Monkton Bluefriars club.

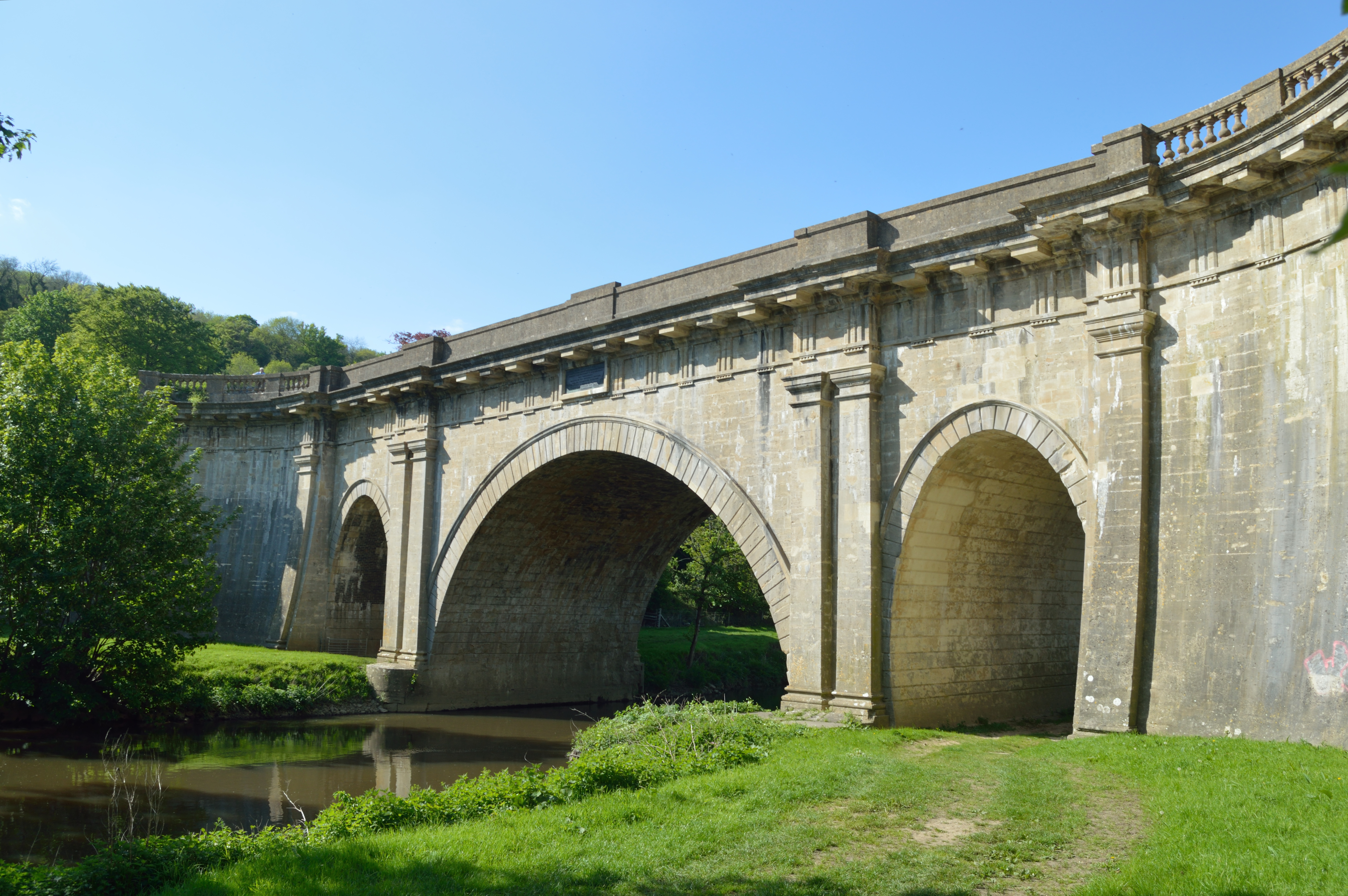
Dundas Aqueduct, behind which sits the older boathouse

== Houses ==
At the Senior school there are three boys houses: Farm, Eddystone and School; and three girls houses: Grange, Clarendon and Nutfield. Each house has both day and boarding pupils. The Prep school has four mixed houses: Howard, Easterfield, Kearns & Jameson, as well as one boarding house (Hatton) which does not come into the main house system.

== Achievements and artefacts ==
=== Olympic medalists ===
The school has produced five Olympic rowing medalists. Each represented Great Britain and three won gold medals.

In addition, an OM achieved an Olympic Gold Medal representing Great Britain at men's hockey, while another captained the England Netball Team which won Gold at the 2018 Commonwealth Games.

=== HMS Magpie ===
The school has ties to the Royal Navy ship HMS Magpie, a Black Swan-class sloop which was commanded by then Lieutenant-Commander, later Admiral of the Fleet, the Duke of Edinburgh. The ties were established when the ship took the prep school's badge, a magpie (designed by the art mistress, Miss Bulmer), as its ship's emblem.

The ship's bell was presented to the prep School upon its decommissioning. The link is maintained with the current HMS Magpie, a survey ship, which continues to use the magpie emblem.

=== Marshall Antarctic sled and flag ===
OM Lieutenant Colonel Eric Marshall, who was surgeon on the 1907 British Antarctic Nimrod Expedition donated a sled and flag used on the expedition to the school, which remained on display for many years. The school sold them at auction in 2018, replacing it with a replica sculpture, ‘Discovery & Endeavour’ which is on display in the inner quadrangle.

== Head masters ==
The following have been head master and/or principal of the school:

- 1868–1875 Revd F. Pocock
- 1875–1895 Revd R.G. Bryan
- 1895–1900 Revd W.E. Bryan
- 1900–1900 Revd N. Bennett
- 1900–1926 Revd J.W. Kearns
- 1926–1946 Revd E. Hayward
- 1946–1968 D.R. Wigram
- 1968–1978 R.J. Knight
- 1978–1990 R.A.C. Meredith
- 1990–2005 M.J. Cuthbertson
- 2005–2015 R. Backhouse
- 2016–2025 C. Wheeler
- 2025–2025 J. Goodman
- 2025–present B. Salisbury

== Notable masters ==
- Revd. R.W. Ryde, 1866–1909, Classics Master
- D. Vaughan-Thomas, 1873–1934, Mathematics & Music Master
- A.S. Sellick, 1878–1958, Cricket Master
- G.F. Graham Brown, 1891–1942, History Master and former pupil
- F. Vallis, 1896–1957, Association Football and Cricket Master
- T.M. Watson, 1913–1994, French Master
- N.D. Botton, 1954–, History Master
- M. Wells, 1979–, Rowing Master

== Notable alumni ==
=== 19th century ===
- George Somes Layard, 1857–1925, barrister, journalist and man of letters
- Harry Martindale Speechly, 1866–1951, Canadian doctor
- Montague Waldegrave, 5th Baron Radstock, 1867–1953, peer
- Count Vladimir Alekseyevich Bobrinsky, 1868–1927, Tsarist politician from the Second to the Fourth Duma
- Count Paul Bobrinsky, 1869–1919, Peter's twin and Russian counter-revolutionary
- Count Peter Bobrinsky, 1869–1932, Paul's twin and Russian counter-revolutionary
- Harry Colt, 1869–1951, widely regarded as the father of golf course architecture
- Ernest Crosbie Trench 1869–1960, British civil engineer
- Sir Ernest Wills, 3rd Baronet 1869–1958, part-owner of W. D. & H. O. Wills and Lord Lieutenant of Wiltshire
- Edwyn Bevan 1870–1943, British philosopher and Hellenistic historian
- Archibald Kennedy, 4th Marquess of Ailsa 1873–1943, British peer, barrister and soldier
- Horatio Powys-Keck, 1873–1952, first class cricketer
- Alfred Young 1873–1940, mathematician and inventor of the Young diagram and Young tableau
- Lieutenant Colonel Richard Annesley West 1878–1918, recipient of the Victoria Cross for sacrificing his life for his men
- Lieutenant Colonel Eric Marshall, 1879–1963, Antarctic explorer in Shackleton's Nimrod Expedition
- Frank Lugard Brayne 1882–1952, administrator in the Indian Civil Service
- Revd. Richard Howard, 1884–1981, Provost of Coventry Cathedral during its destruction, Archdeacon of Coventry
- Revd. William Thompson 1885–1975, Bishop of Iran
- Revd. Robert Wilmot Howard, 1887–1960, Master of St Peter's Hall, Oxford
- Hugh Norton 1890–1969, Archdeacon of Sudbury
- Revd. Francis Graham Brown 1891–1942, Principal of Wycliffe Hall, Oxford and Bishop of Jerusalem
- Air Chief Marshal Sir Richard Peirse 1892–1970, Commander-in-Chief of the Indian Air Force and of RAF Bomber Command
- Dr. Sir Clement Chesterman 1894–1983, medical missionary at Yakusu in the Congo with the Baptist Missionary Society
- Harold Gilbee Anderson (1896–1977), medical missionary to China with the Church Mission Society

=== Early 20th century ===
- Michael Head, 1900–1976, composer, singer and musical educator
- Dr. W. E. Shewell-Cooper, 1900–1982, organic gardening pioneer
- Percival Spear, 1901–1982, historian and civil servant in India
- Revd. Charles Claxton, 1903–1992, Bishop of Warrington, Blackburn, Lord Spiritual
- Revd. Kenneth Mathews, 1906–1992, Dean of St Albans
- R. C. Hutchinson, 1907–1976, novelist
- David Howard Adeney, 1911–1994, missionary in China and East Asia
- Alfred James Broomhall, 1911–1994, historian and medical missionary to China with the China Inland Mission
- Charles Sergel, 1911–1980, Olympic rower and medical missionary to Uganda
- Revd. Gonville ffrench-Beytagh, 1912–1991, Dean of Johannesburg and anti-apartheid activist.
- Major-General John Frost, 1912–1993, leader of airborne forces during the Battle of Arnhem
- Colin Butler, 1913–2016, entomologist who first isolated the pheromone
- Martyn Cundy, 1913–2005, reforming mathematical educator and academic
- Thorley Walters, 1913–1991, actor
- Thomas Watson, 1913–1994, first class cricketer
- Professor John Anderson Strong, 1915–2012, President of the Royal College of Physicians of Edinburgh
- Dr. Ran Laurie, 1915–1998, Olympic rowing champion and physician
- J. Desmond Clark, 1916–2002, influential archaeologist and Professor of Anthropology at the University of California, Berkeley
- The Right Revd. Maurice Wood, 1916–2007, Principal of Oak Hill Theological College and Bishop of Norwich
- Harold Jameson (1918–1940), first-class cricketer
- Lt Kevin Walton, 1918–2009, Antarctic explorer
- Squadron Leader James MacLachlan, 1919–1943, flying ace
- Revd. Hassan Dehqani-Tafti, 1920–1990, Bishop of Iran
- Revd. Graham Leonard, 1921–2010, Bishop of London
- Revd. David Brown, 1922–1982, Bishop of Guildford and missionary
- Prince Asrate Kassa, 1922–1974, Viceroy of Eritrea
- Pilot Officer Alfred Mellows, 1922–1997, Olympic rower
- Arthur Wallis, 1922–1988, itinerant Bible teacher and author
- Captain David Eyton-Jones, 1923–2012, SAS officer during Operation Tombola, businessman and chaplain
- Michael Lapage, 1923–2018, Olympic rower and missionary
- Colonel David Wood, 1923–2009, last surviving officer of the capture of the Caen canal and Orne river bridges
- Professor David Marshall Lang, 1924–1991, Professor of Caucasian Studies at the School of Oriental and African Studies
- Senator Andy Thompson, 1924–2016, leader of the Ontario Liberal Party
- Major General Sir Philip Ward, 1924–2003, GOC London District and Lord Lieutenant of West Sussex
- Revd. Allan Rutter, 1928-, first class cricketer and vicar
- Christopher Buxton, 1929–2017, property developer and President of The Abbeyfield Society
- Right Revd. John Bone, 1930–2014, Bishop of Reading
- Count Michel Didisheim, 1930–2020, Private Secretary and Chief of the Royal Household to Albert, Prince of Liège
- Adrian Mitchell, 1932–2008, poet, novelist and playwright
- Barclay Palmer, 1932–2020, Olympic athlete
- John Chester, 1935–2022, Olympic rower
- Professor Gerald Blake, 1936-, Professor Emeritus of Geography at Durham University and former Principal of Collingwood College, Durham
- John Barnard Bush, 1937–2024, land-owner and former Lord Lieutenant of Wiltshire
- Michael Mortimore, 1937–2017, geographer and a researcher of issues in the African drylands
- Air Chief Marshal Sir Michael Stear, 1938–2020, Deputy Commander in Chief, Allied Forces Central Europe
- Revd. Stephen Sykes, 1939–2014, Regius Professor of Divinity at the University of Cambridge and Bishop of Ely
- Michael Barton Akehurst, 1940–1989, international lawyer
- Peter Webb, 1940-1993, Olympic rower
- Sir Tim Lankester, 1942–, former President of Corpus Christi College, Oxford
- Professor Nick Jardine, 1943-, Emeritus Professor at the Department of History and Philosophy of Science at the University of Cambridge
- Sir Richard Stilgoe, 1943–, songwriter, lyricist and musician
- Bernard Cornwell, 1944–, historical novelist
- Revd. Ian Cundy, 1945–2009, Bishop of Lewes and Bishop of Peterborough
- Sir Richard Dearlove 1945-, Head of the British Secret Intelligence Service (MI6) from 1999 until 2004 and former Master of Pembroke College, Cambridge
- Ricky Panter, 1948-, Archdeacon of Liverpool
- Nigel Sinclair 1948-, Hollywood producer
- Sir Iain Torrance 1949–, Pro-Chancellor of the University of Aberdeen and former Moderator of the General Assembly of the Church of Scotland
- Sir David Haslam 1949- Former Chair of National Institute for Health and Care Excellence (NICE) and President of BMA and RCGP

=== Late 20th century ===
- Professor Sir Robert Lechler, 1951–, President of the Academy of Medical Sciences and Professor of Immunology at King's College London
- John Reed, 1951-, former Archdeacon of Taunton
- Julian Colbeck, 1952-, musician and businessman
- Professor Mike Cowlishaw, 1953–, programmer and scientist
- Howard Milner, 1953–2011, tenor
- James Hawkins, 1954-, artist and film-maker
- Lord Nigel Biggar 1955-, Regius Professor of Moral and Pastoral Theology at the University of Oxford
- Chris Anderson, 1957–, Journalist and publisher, Owner of TED and curator of TED Talks.
- Stephen Warren, 1957–, Professor of Astrophysics at Imperial College London
- John Kiddle, 1958-, Archdeacon of Wandsworth
- Professor Phil Hockey, 1959–2013, South African ornithologist, director of the Percy FitzPatrick Institute of African Ornithology, University of Cape Town
- Sir Charles Farr, 1959–2019, Chairman of the Joint Intelligence Committee and Head of the Joint Intelligence Organisation
- Lieutenant General Tim Evans, 1962-, former Commander of the Allied Rapid Reaction Corps
- Steve Williams, 1976–, Olympic rowing champion
- Rowley Douglas, 1977-, Olympic coxswain champion
- James Frith, 1977-, Member of Parliament for Bury North
- Seyi Rhodes, 1979–, television presenter and investigative journalist
- Alex Partridge, 1981–, Olympic rower and World Rowing champion
- Ama Agbeze, 1982–, former Captain of the England national netball team
- Josh Ovens, 1989-, farmer and former player for Bath Rugby

=== 21st century ===
- Ben Wells, 2000-, first class cricketer
