= Honest to God =

1963 book by John Robinson

- First edition
- Author: John A. T. Robinson Bishop of Woolwich
- Language: English
- Genre: Christian theology Christian Apologetics
- Publisher: SCM Press
- Publication date: 1963
- Publication place: United Kingdom
- Media type: Print (Paperback)
- OCLC: 223392783

Honest to God is a book written by the Anglican Bishop of Woolwich John A.T. Robinson, criticising traditional Christian theology. It aroused a storm of controversy on its original publication by SCM Press in 1963.

Robinson's own evaluation of Honest to God, found in his subsequent book Exploration into God (1967), stated that the chief contribution of this book was its successful synthesis of the work of seemingly opposed theologians Paul Tillich, Dietrich Bonhoeffer and Rudolf Bultmann.

== Major themes in Honest to God ==
The dominant theory of Honest to God is that having rejected the idea of 'God up there', modern secular man needs to recognize that the idea of 'God out there' is also an outdated simplification of the nature of divinity. Rather, Christians should take their cue from the existentialist theology of Paul Tillich and consider God to be 'the ground of our being'.

Dietrich Bonhoeffer's notion of religion-less Christianity is also a major theme in the book. Robinson's interpretation of this phrase is—inevitably—controversial. He claims that secular man requires a secular theology. That is, that God's continuing revelation to humanity is one brought about in culture at large, not merely within the confines of "religion" or "church."

The book also introduced the idea of situational ethics to an English speaking audience.

== Controversy and criticism ==
The book was controversial even before its publication, as an interview about it with Robinson in The Observer bore the provocative headline "Our Image of God Must Go". Some of the letters and articles for and against Robinson's views were published by the end of the year in The Honest to God Debate. A flurry of books on the subject appeared by everyone from the Ceylon Rationalist Association to Patience Strong.

The book was almost universally condemned by traditionalists, but was hailed as a breath of fresh air by many liberals. Michael Ramsey, Archbishop of Canterbury, thought that Robinson's theology was weak, and that he had only a vague understanding of many of the issues he brought into the mainstream. Eugene Fairweather was another Anglican who raised similar concerns, especially with respect to the apparent conviction (which he associated especially with Canon Max Warren of Westminster Abbey but also with many others) that what matters most is not the adequacy of the content of the book to the truth but rather the sincerity and courage displayed by its author. Furthermore, Fairweather, who had been a doctoral student of Tillich (from whom Robinson attempted to derive much of his theology), was at one with Ramsey in regarding as risible much of what Robinson has to say about classical doctrinal formulations.

Some professional theologians saw Honest to God as a popularisation of the radical shifts in theological thinking brought about by Protestant theologians like Rudolf Bultmann and Paul Tillich, although Robinson did not intend to write a work for a wide popular audience.

In his last interview before his death, C. S. Lewis was asked, "What do you think of the controversial new book Honest to God, by John Robinson, the bishop of Woolwich? Lewis replied, "I prefer being honest, to being 'honest to God.'" Lewis also wrote a short article entitled "Must our Image of God Go?" which appeared in The Observer shortly after the similarly titled Robinson interview.

== See also ==
- Lambeth Palace Library, which contains John A. T. Robinson's collection of books relating to 'Honest to God',.
