= Phil Hockey =

South African ornithologist

- Born: Philip Anthony Richard Hockey; 8 March 1956; Bournemouth, England
- Died: 24 January 2013 (aged 56); Cape Town, South Africa
- Education: Monkton Combe School
- Alma mater: Edinburgh University; University of Cape Town
- Scientific career
- Fields: Ornithologist
- Institutions: Percy FitzPatrick Institute of African Ornithology
- Thesis: Ecology of the African black oystercatcher, Haematopus moquini (1983)

Philip Anthony Richard Hockey (8 March 1956 – 24 January 2013) was a well-known South African ornithologist. He was director of the Percy FitzPatrick Institute of African Ornithology at the University of Cape Town, co-editor of Roberts' Birds of Southern Africa and co-author of Sasol Birds of Southern Africa. Hockey was born in Bournemouth, England in 1956 and moved to South Africa in 1979. His doctoral study was on the African oystercatcher. He focused on shorebirds, writing the book Waders of Southern Africa. Hockey observed 885 different species of birds in Southern Africa.

== Books ==
- Sinclair, Ian; Hockey, Phil; Tarboton, Warwick (2002). Sasol birds of Southern Africa : the region's most comprehensively illustrated guide (3rd ed., fully rev. and updated ed.). Cape Town: Struik. ISBN 1-86872-721-1. OCLC 52377304.
- Hockey, P. A. R. (1995). Waders of Southern Africa. Cape Town: Struik Winchester. ISBN 0-947430-45-8. OCLC 34553398.
- Hockey, P. A. R. (2001). The African Penguin : A Natural History (1st ed.). Cape Town: Struik. ISBN 1-86872-523-5. OCLC 46615654.
- Hockey, Phil (1996). Birds In Action. Johannesburg: CNA. ISBN 1-874951-12-8. OCLC 85922904.
