= Christopher Buxton =

Christopher Buxton may refer to:

- Christopher Buxton (martyr) (1562–1588), English Roman Catholic priest and martyr
- Christopher Buxton (property developer) (1929–2017), English property developer
