= Religious liberalism =

Religious philosophy emphasizing liberty

Religious liberalism (also called liberal religion and, in theistic religion, liberal theology) is a broad approach to religion that emphasizes the authority of individual reason and experience over tradition, dogma, or scripture interpreted literally. Rather than treating inherited doctrines as fixed and binding, religious liberals seek to reinterpret their traditions in light of modern knowledge, including the findings of the natural sciences, historical criticism, and moral philosophy.

It is an attitude towards one's own religion, taken by people who remain committed to a religious tradition while seeking to reform it from within, contrasting with both a traditionalist or orthodox approach on the one hand and criticism of religion from a secular position on the other. It is directly opposed by trends of religious fundamentalism.

Religious liberalism is related to but distinct from religious liberty, which refers to the political principle of tolerating diverse religious beliefs and practices. As the philosopher Jay Newman noted, "Many people who think that religious liberty is basically a good thing that ought to be promoted do not wish to be regarded as advocates of religious liberalism; some of them even feel that many of those who call themselves 'religious liberals' are enemies of religious liberty." However, in some traditions, particularly Islam, the theological and political dimensions of liberalism are closely intertwined, with reform movements simultaneously addressing questions of doctrine and of civil rights, democracy, and pluralism.

Although the term originated in Protestant Christianity and the phenomenon has been most extensively studied in that context, analogous liberal movements have developed in Judaism, Islam, and other religious traditions, particularly in response to the challenges posed by the Enlightenment and modernity.

== Origins and characteristics ==
Many of the thinkers of the 18th-century Age of Enlightenment who emphasized freedom of thought and who are now associated with liberal philosophy—such as Locke, Hume, Kant, Lessing, and Paine—also contributed to philosophy of religion. Usage of the term liberal in the context of religious philosophy appeared as early as the mid-19th century—when the term was also associated with generosity, gentility, and dignity—and became established by the first part of the 20th century.

In 1936, philosophy professor and Disciples of Christ minister Edward Scribner Ames, in his article "Liberalism in Religion", described liberalism as "a general movement of Western culture" characterized by "the critical quest for liberty, for freedom, for growth in the capacity and power of individuals and societies to achieve more satisfying ways of living", and he described the emerging sense of liberalism in religion:

The term "liberalism" seems to be developing a religious usage which gives it growing significance. It is more sharply contrasted with fundamentalism, and signifies a far deeper meaning than modernism. Fundamentalism describes a relatively uncritical attitude. In it custom, traditionalism, and authoritarianism are dominant. ... There is no doubt that the loss of the traditional faith has left many people confused and rudderless, and they are finding that there is no adequate satisfaction in mere excitement or in flight from their finer ideals. They crave a sense of deeper meaning and direction for their life. Religious liberalism, not as a cult but as an attitude and method, turns to the living realities in the actual tasks of building more significant individual and collective human life.

Theologian and Episcopal priest Gary Dorrien, in his three-volume history of American liberal theology published in the early 2000s, identified several recurring characteristics: openness to historical criticism and evolutionary theory, a commitment to the authority of individual reason and experience, a conception of religion as primarily an ethical way of life, and an effort to make inherited faith credible and socially relevant to contemporary people. Dorrien argued that the liberal theological tradition was "motivated by a desire to map a progressive 'third way' between authority-based orthodoxies and atheistic rationalism".

The anthropologist Emanuel de Kadt, writing comparatively across the Abrahamic religions, defined liberal religion broadly as "those currents within [Judaism, Christianity, and Islam] that are more progressive, more open, more willing to challenge accepted views and structures". He argues that while the initial impetus came from the Protestant side, analogous movements within Catholicism and Judaism developed in response, "though often without acknowledging this".

According to the Encyclopædia Britannica, the defining feature of theological liberalism is "a will to be liberated from the coercion of external controls and a consequent concern with inner motivation".

== In Christianity ==
Liberal theology developed first and most extensively within Protestant Christianity, beginning in the late eighteenth century. The Encyclopædia Britannica identifies three broad phases: an Enlightenment phase emphasizing rational autonomy; a Romantic phase centered on individual experience and feeling; and a Modernist phase focused on historical consciousness and progress.

The Romantic phase was shaped decisively by the German theologian Friedrich Schleiermacher (1768–1834), often called the father of modern Protestant theology. Unlike Kant, who located the core of religion in moral will, Schleiermacher grounded religion in the "feeling of absolute dependence", an immediate awareness of one's relationship to the infinite. The German Albrecht Ritschl subsequently dominated liberal Protestant theology after Schleiermacher, shifting the emphasis toward the ethical dimensions of Christianity and the Kingdom of God as a moral community to be realized in history. Wilhelm Herrmann and Adolf von Harnack were Ritschl's most prominent followers.

In the United States, Horace Bushnell was the most significant liberal theologian of the nineteenth century. Walter Rauschenbusch later became the leading figure of the Social Gospel movement, which applied liberal theological principles to questions of economic justice and social reform.

Liberal theology's influence declined significantly with the rise of neo-orthodoxy in the 1930s, particularly through Karl Barth's critique of liberal Protestantism's accommodation to culture. Subsequent movements, including liberation theology and postliberal theology, also challenged liberal assumptions from different directions.

Historian Matthew Hedstrom has argued that religious liberalism in the United States contributed to the rise of new post-Christian forms of spirituality (e.g. the spiritual but not religious).

=== Catholic liberalism ===
The Catholic Church has had a long and contested relationship with theological liberalism. Catholic modernism, associated with figures such as Alfred Loisy and George Tyrrell, sought to apply historical-critical methods to Catholic theology in the late nineteenth and early twentieth centuries, but was condemned by Pope Pius X in the 1907 encyclical Pascendi Dominici gregis.

Cardinal John Henry Newman (1801–1890) was considered moderately liberal by 19th-century standards because he was critical of papal infallibility, but he explicitly opposed "liberalism in religion", defining it as "the doctrine that there is no positive truth in religion, but that one creed is as good as another".

=== Conservative critiques ===
The conservative Presbyterian biblical scholar J. Gresham Machen criticized what he termed "naturalistic liberalism" in his 1923 book, Christianity and Liberalism, in which he intended to show that "despite the liberal use of traditional phraseology modern liberalism not only is a different religion from Christianity but belongs in a totally different class of religions".

The Anglican Christian apologist C. S. Lewis voiced a similar view in the mid-20th century, arguing that "theology of the liberal type" amounted to a complete reinvention of Christianity.

== In Judaism ==
German-Jewish intellectuals began to apply Enlightenment principles and critical scholarship to Jewish theology and practice from the early nineteenth century, a movement known as the Haskalah. This eventually gave rise to several non-Orthodox denominations, from the moderately liberal Conservative Judaism to the more thoroughgoing Reform Judaism. The moderate wing of Modern Orthodox Judaism, especially Open Orthodoxy, has also adopted some elements of this approach.

Reconstructionist Judaism, founded by Mordecai Kaplan in the twentieth century, represents one of the most radical expressions of Jewish religious liberalism. Kaplan believed that a naturalistic approach to religion and ethics was possible in a secularizing world, understanding God not as a supernatural person but as the sum of all natural processes that enable human fulfillment.

== In Islam ==
Liberal and progressive currents within Islam have developed through the practice of ijtihad (independent reasoning in the interpretation of Islamic law and scripture). This can vary considerably in scope; at the more liberal end, only the meaning of the Quran is considered revelatory, with its specific expression in words understood as the work of Muhammad in his particular historical context.

Islamic Modernism has been described as "the first Muslim ideological response to the Western cultural challenge", attempting to reconcile Islamic faith with modern values such as nationalism, democracy, civil rights, rationality, equality, and progress. It featured a "critical reexamination of the classical conceptions and methods of jurisprudence" and a new approach to Islamic theology and Quranic exegesis.

Founders of Islamic modernism include Muhammad Abduh, a Sheikh of Al-Azhar University, Jamal ad-Din al-Afghani, and Muhammad Rashid Rida (d. 1935). It was the first of several Islamic movements, including secularism, Islamism, and the Salafi movement, that emerged in the middle of the 19th century in reaction to the rapid changes of the time, especially the perceived impact of Western culture and colonialism on the Muslim world.

Liberal Muslims generally see themselves as recovering the ethical and pluralistic intent of the early Muslim community (ummah) and the Quran. They distance themselves from some traditional interpretations of Islamic law which they regard as culturally specific rather than universally binding. The reform movement uses Tawhid (monotheism) "as an organizing principle for human society and the basis of religious knowledge, history, metaphysics, aesthetics, and ethics, as well as social, economic and world order".

The early Islamic modernists used the term salafiyya to refer to their attempt at renovation of Islamic thought, though this is distinct from the contemporary Salafi movement, which generally refers to ideologies such as Wahhabism. According to Malise Ruthven, Islamic modernism has suffered since its inception from co-option by both secularist rulers and by "the official ulama" whose "task it is to legitimise" those rulers' actions in religious terms.

Some scholars, such as Omid Safi, distinguish between "progressive Islam" and "liberal Islam" as related but distinct orientations. Examples of liberal movements within Islam include Progressive British Muslims (formed following the 2005 London attacks, defunct by 2012), British Muslims for Secular Democracy (formed 2006), and Muslims for Progressive Values (formed 2007).

== In eastern religions ==
Eastern religious traditions were not directly shaped by the European Enlightenment but have undertaken their own reform movements, often after contact with Western thought. Hindu reform movements emerged in British India in the nineteenth century, with figures such as Ram Mohan Roy and the Brahmo Samaj seeking to reconcile Hindu traditions with rationalist and universalist principles.

Buddhist modernism arose in its Japanese form as a reaction to the Meiji Restoration, and was further transformed outside Japan in the twentieth century, notably giving rise to modern forms of Zen Buddhism. It is characterized by a de-emphasis on ritual and cosmology in favor of meditation, ethics, and compatibility with scientific understandings of the world.

== Unitarian Universalism and "liberal religion" ==
The term liberal religion has been used particularly by Unitarian Christians and Unitarian Universalists to describe their own tradition. In 1856, the Unitarian minister George Edward Ellis wrote:

The first of all the requisites in such a religion is that it shall be Liberal. We mention this condition even before that of Truth, because a religion that is not liberal cannot be true. The devout and intelligent demand a liberal religion, a religion large, free, generous, comprehensive in its lessons, a religion expansive in its spirit, lofty in its views, and with a sweep of blessings as wide as the range of man's necessities and sins.

— George Edward Ellis, "Relations of Reason and Faith" (1856)

The Journal of Liberal Religion was published by the Unitarian Ministerial Union, Meadville Theological School, and the Universalist Ministerial Association from 1939 to 1949, edited by James Luther Adams, an influential Unitarian theologian. A new version of the journal was published online from 1999 to 2009.

The term has also been used by Quakers (Religious Society of Friends) to describe their tradition.

== See also ==
- Demythologization
- Historical criticism
- Liberal theism
- Multiple religious belonging
- Post-theism
- Postchristianity
- Postliberal theology
- Red-Letter Christians
- Religious humanism
- Religious naturalism
- Religious pluralism
- Religious Society of Friends
- Sea of Faith
- Secular spirituality
- Secular theology
- Secularism
- Spiritual naturalism
