= Michael Barton Akehurst =

Michael Barton Akehurst (1940 – 4 October 1989) was an international lawyer. He was the author of the Modern Introduction to International Law which remains the most widely used student text in the field. Seven editions have been published, it has been translated into Spanish, Portuguese, and Japanese and it was updated after his death by Peter Malanczuk under the title 'Akehurst's Modern Introduction to International Law'.

Akehurst was educated at Monkton Combe School, Somerset, then Emmanuel College, Cambridge (MA, LLB) and the University of Paris, where he received a doctorate. After working for the United Nations Relief and Works Agency for Palestine Refugees in the Near East in Beirut, he spent the rest of his career in the Department of Law at Keele University and he was a member of the editorial committee of the British Yearbook of International Law.

He died in Crewe, Cheshire aged 49. His reputation is such that eight leading academics in the field dedicated their Essays on the United Nations and the Principles of International Law to his memory in 1994.
