= Fort Cumberland (England) =

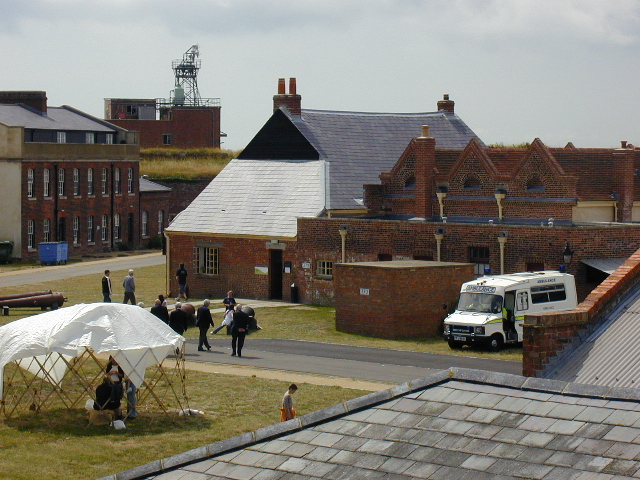
- Interior of the fort.

- Location within Hampshire
- 50°47′20″N 1°1′57″W
- Type: Palmerston fort
- Location: Southsea
- OS grid reference: SZ 68283 99138

History
- Built: 1785–1812

Site notes
- Area: Hampshire
- Owner: English Heritage

Listed Building – Grade II*
- Official name: Fort Cumberland, City of Portsmouth
- Designated: 30 October 1969
- Reference no.: 1104273

Scheduled monument
- Official name: Fort Cumberland
- Designated: 16 March 1964
- Reference no.: 1015700

Fort Cumberland is a pentagonal artillery fortification erected to guard the entrance to Langstone Harbour, east of the Dockyard of Portsmouth on the south coast of England. It was sited to protect the Royal Navy Dockyard, by preventing enemy forces from landing in Langstone Harbour and attacking from the landward side. Fort Cumberland is widely recognised as the finest example of a bastion trace fort in England. It is a scheduled monument and a Grade II* listed building

== The first fort (1747-1785) ==
The first fort on the site was built by the Duke of Cumberland. Although there did previously exist an earthwork battery on the site, built in 1714. Work on Cumberland's fort commenced on 1 January 1747 and was substantially complete by the end of 1748. The fort had an irregular star shaped form, and was of earthwork construction. In section, the defences comprised a glacis, banquette and covered way, a dry ditch, berm, rampart, parapet and terre-plein. Within the body of the fort, a number of brick buildings were constructed, comprising a guardhouse, storeroom and powder magazine; of the two proposed barrack blocks, only one is believed to have been completed.

== The second fort (1785-1812) ==
Fort Cumberland was completely rebuilt in masonry, and on a considerably larger scale, as part of a programme to improve the fortifications of Portsmouth. Major building work started in 1785, although preliminary stockpiling of materials began in 1782, and was essentially completed by 1812. In the course of construction all traces of the original fort were destroyed, with the exception of the guard house and store room, both of which were incorporated into the new design. The second fort occupies a similar position to the first, but is substantially larger in scale, enclosing an area of 24 acres (97,000 m^{2}), and on a different alignment. It is a pentagonal fort, with five bastions and a ravelin on the western side. It was the last fort with angle bastions to be built in the United Kingdom, and the first to provide casemated ordnance.

== Re-armament: the 1850s - 1860s ==
By the late 1850s, the development of rifled cannon had rendered the fort's smooth bored muzzle loading ordnance obsolete. In late 1858 the fort was transferred from the War Department to the Board of Admiralty and, in 1859 it became the headquarters of the Royal Marine Artillery. Between 1860 and 1861, the defences were improved to accommodate new muzzle loaded Armstrong guns.

== Re-armament: the 1880s - 1890s ==
Between 1886 and 1892, major modifications were made to three of the bastions to accommodate new armaments, 6inch B.L. MkIV guns on Mark IV Hydropneumatic Disappearing mountings. These modifications included cutting down the bastions and infilling them internally, and the creation of new magazines underneath. By 1892, the fort was equipped with three 6-inch (150 mm) BLs, two 9-inch (230 mm) RMLs and 1 64 pounder.

== The fort in the 20th century ==
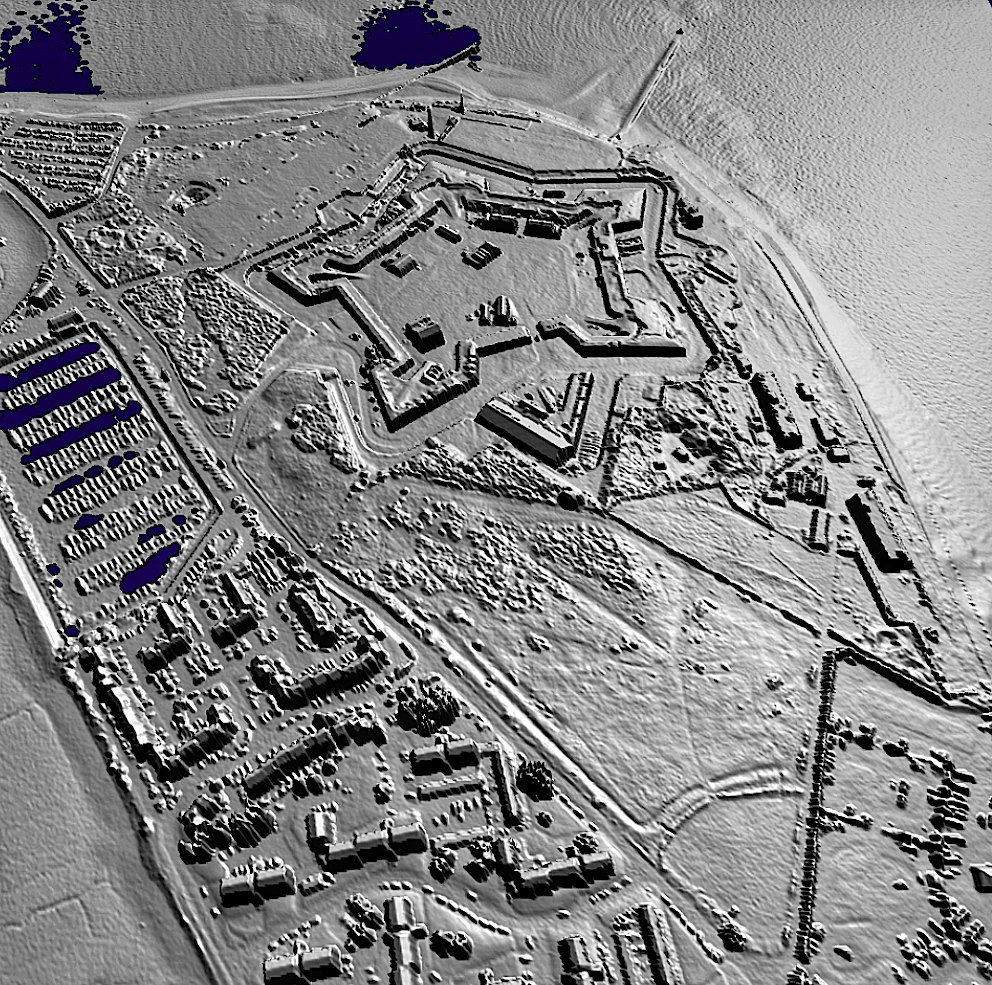
A lidar view of the fort.

Fort Cumberland remained in military ownership for most of the twentieth century, serving as a base for the Royal Marine Artillery howitzer and anti aircraft brigade, and later for the Royal Marine Mobile Naval Base Defence Organisation, as an experimental and training centre. Beginning in 1938, Fort Cumberland also provided space for the Inter-Service Training and Development Centre. The fort saw brief action during the Second World War when, on 26 August 1940, it was hit by a German air raid in which eight Royal Marines were killed, amongst them Second Lieutenant Harold Jameson. It was used by the Royal Marines into the 1970s.

In 1964 the fort was scheduled as an ancient monument, and subsequently taken into the guardianship of English Heritage in 1975. Since that time, the fort has served as a base for English Heritage's archaeological team, the Central Archaeology Service (formerly the Central Excavation Unit). In 1998, the Ancient Monuments Laboratory were relocated to the fort, leading to the creation of a new Centre for Archaeology. Currently access is limited to pre-booked guided tours.

The Fort is now a Grade II* Listed Building, and many of its surrounding buildings, for example the Guard House, Hospital and Officers' Quarters, are Listed Grade II.

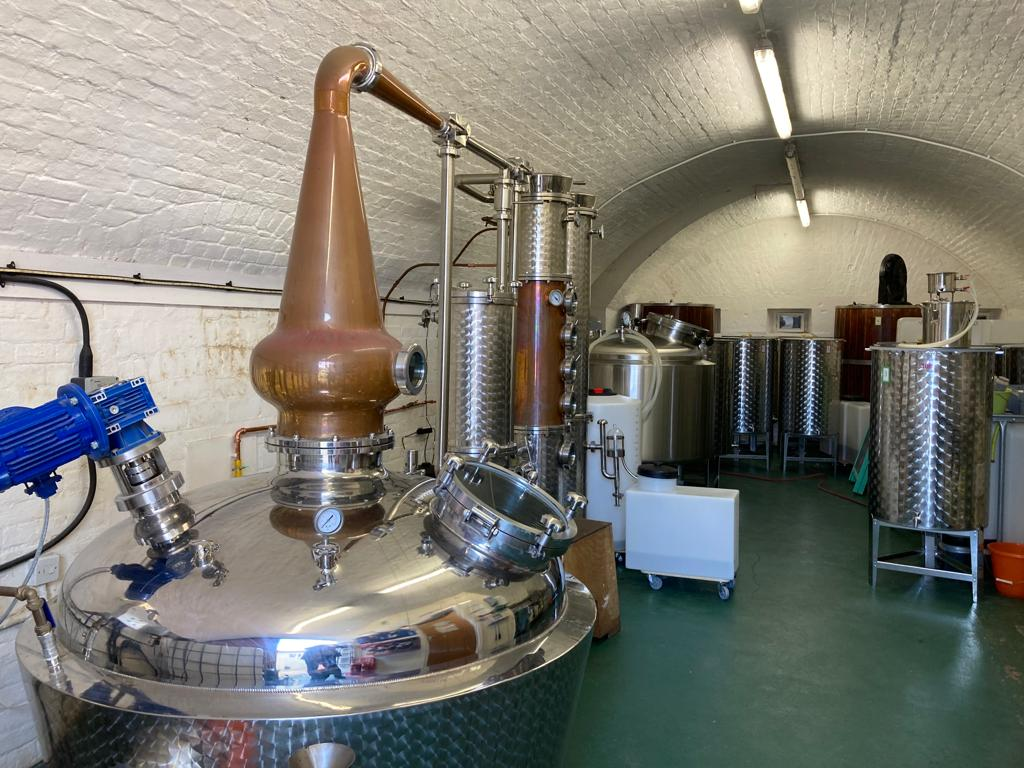
The distillation equipment at Portsmouth Distillery, one of the fort’s contemporary uses

Since 2018 the fort has housed The Portsmouth Distillery Co. in a number of the casemates. The distillery produces both rum and gin. The fort is also home to two veterans charities, Company of Makers and Forgotten Veterans UK.

=== Gallery ===
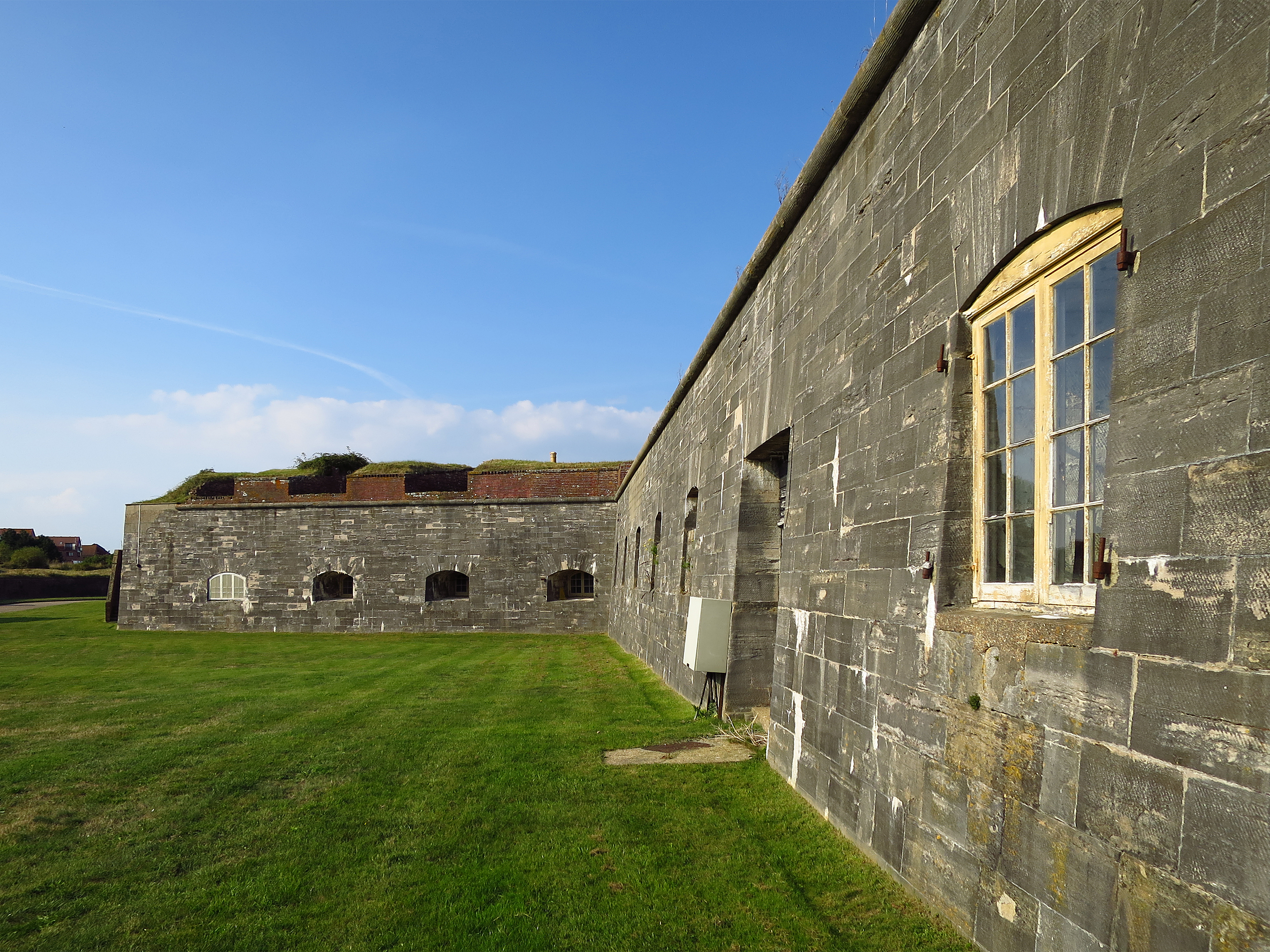
Bastion

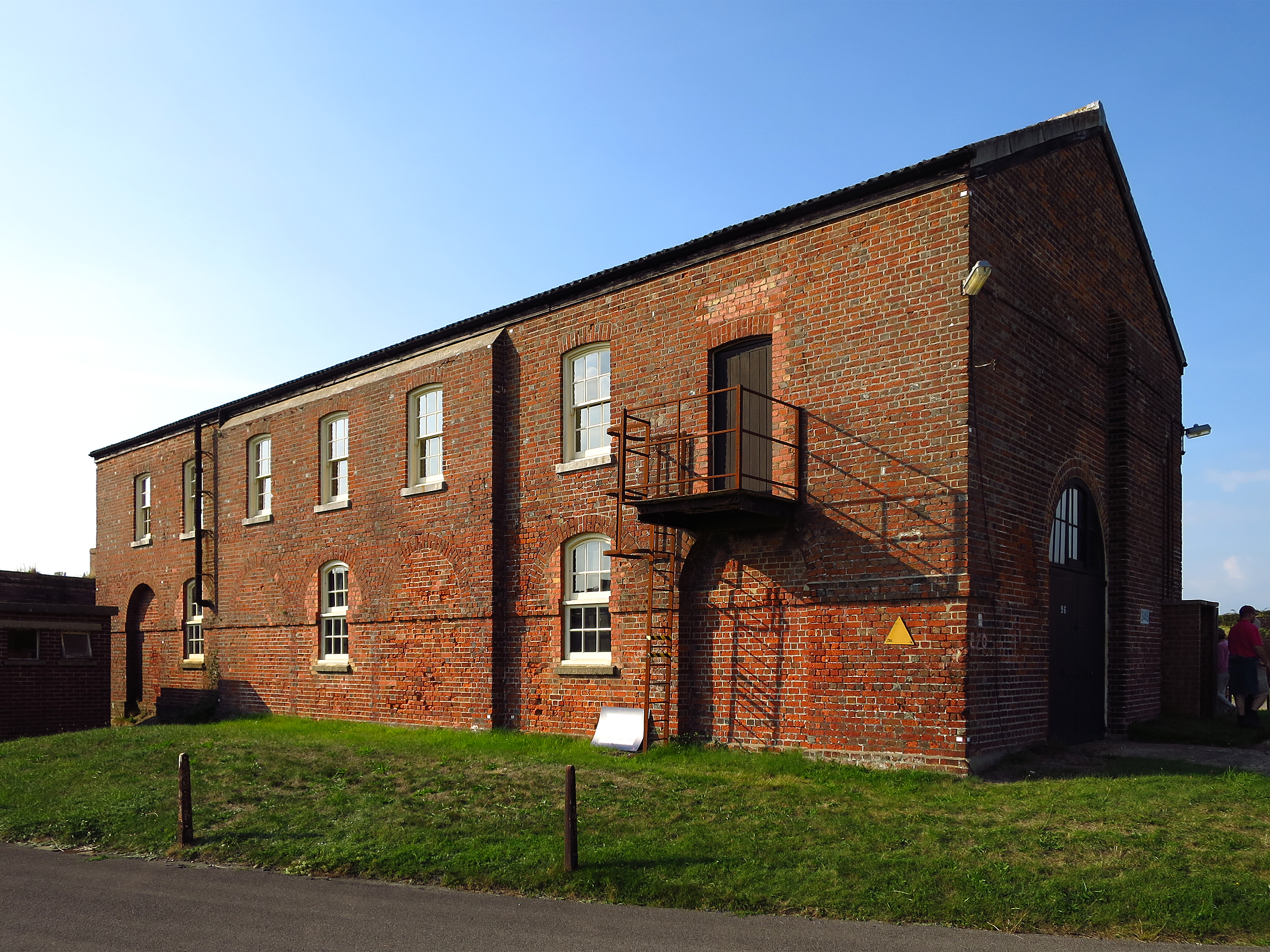
Guardhouse (1746)

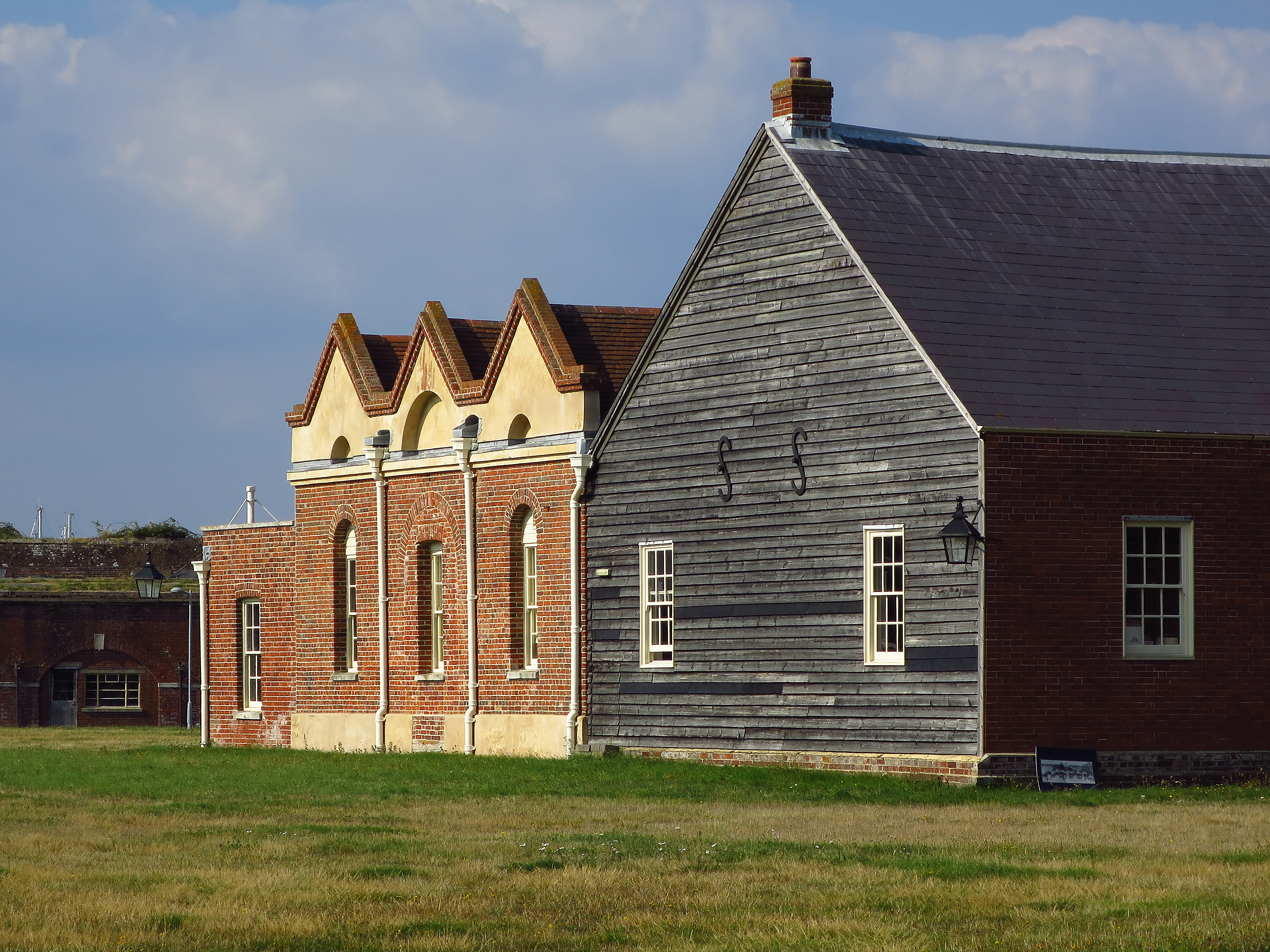
Hospital(1746)

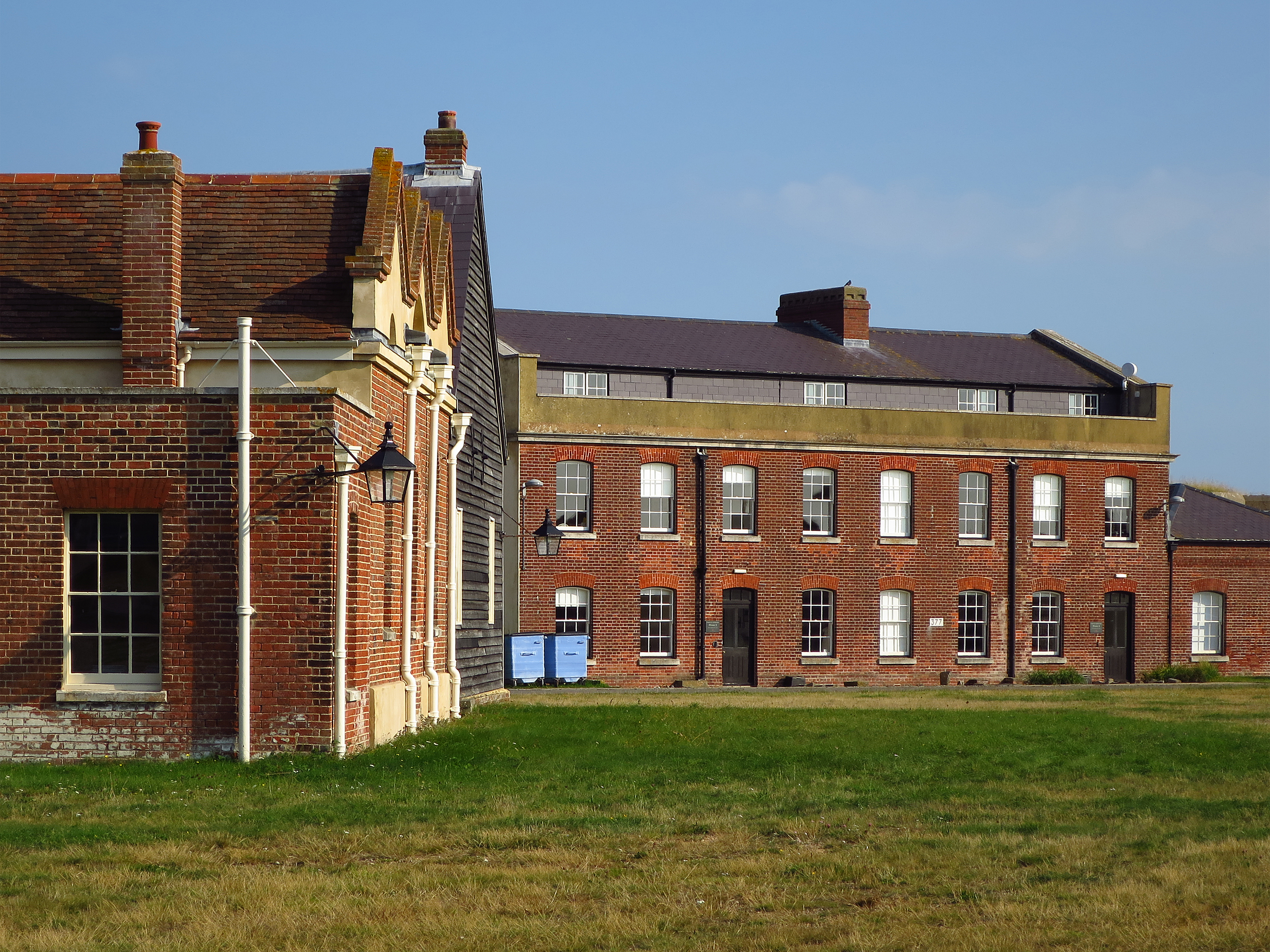
Officers' Quarters (right, 1865)
