= Secular theology =

Theology embracing this-world realities and rejecting dualism

Secular theology is a term applied to theological positions influenced by humanism and secularism, rejecting supernaturalist metaphysical positions related to the nature of God. Secular theology can accommodate a belief in God, like many nature religions, but as residing in this world and not separately from it.

Aristotle's conception of God as the Soul of the World was such a secular concept. Historians such as Charles Freeman hold that the AD 325 Council of Nicaea did much to establish dualism in Christian thought. Dualism has greatly influenced religion and science as well.

== 20th-century Christianity ==
Lutheran and social constructionist sociologist Peter L. Berger states that Schubert M. Ogden's The Reality of God (1966), Paul van Buren's The Secular Meaning of the Gospel and Anglican bishop John A. T. Robinson's Honest to God "marked the rather loud inauguration of what came to be known as secular theology on the Anglo-American scene". Berger further states that Ogden advocates a "secular interpretation of the Christian faith", which, "while rejecting secularism, will also reject supernaturalistic theism", and "distinguishes between secularism and secularity".

The field of secular theology, a subfield of liberal theology advocated by Robinson somewhat combines secularism and theology. Recognized in the 1960s, it was influenced both by neo-orthodoxy, Dietrich Bonhoeffer, Harvey Cox, and the existentialism of Søren Kierkegaard and Paul Tillich. Robinson, along with Douglas John Hall and Rowan Williams, saw that secular theology had digested modern movements like the Death of God theology propagated by Thomas J. J. Altizer or the philosophical existentialism of Tillich and eased the introduction of such ideas into the theological mainstream and made constructive evaluations, as well as contributions, to them.

John Shelby Spong advocated a nuanced approach to scripture, as opposed to biblical literalism, informed by scholarship and compassion which he argues can be consistent with both Christian tradition and a contemporary understanding of the universe. Secular theology holds that theism has lost credibility as a valid conception of God's nature. It rejects the concept of a personal God and embraces the status of Jesus Christ, Christology and Christian eschatology as Christian mythology without basis in historical events.

The movement chiefly came about as a response to general dissatisfaction with the Christian establishment's tendency to lapse into "provincialism" when presented with the "unusual" theological ideas common during the 1960s. The movement also suggested the legitimacy of seeking the holy outside the church itself. Thereby it suggests that the church did not have exclusive rights to divine inspiration. In a sense, this incorporated a strong sense of continuous revelation in which truth of the religious sort was sought out in poetry, music, art, or even the pub and in the street.

== Other religions ==
Certain other religions besides Christianity have developed secular theologies and applied these to core concepts of their own traditions. Notable among such movements has been the Reconstructionist Judaism of Mordecai Kaplan, which understands God and the universe in a manner concordant with Deweyan naturalism.

In Hinduism, the Advaita school of theology is generally regarded as non-theistic as it accepts all interpretations of God or Ishvara.

== See also ==
- Agnostic theism
- Allegorical interpretation of the Bible
- Christian existentialism
- Death of God theology
- Demythologization
- Honest to God
- Jesus Christ and comparative mythology
- Liberal theology
- Nontheistic religions
- Pope Boniface VIII
- Secular humanism
- Secular religion
- Christian atheism
