= Diana Reader Harris =

British school principal 1912–1996

Dame Muriel Diana Reader Harris DBE (11 October 1912, Hong Kong – 7 October 1996, Salisbury, Wiltshire) was an English educator, school principal and public figure. She was a keen advocate of women's ordination in the Church of England.

== Early life ==
Muriel Diana, the elder child of Montgomery Reader Harris (born 1887) and his wife, Frances Mabel (née Wilmot Wilkinson), returned to England at the age of two, but lost her mother to meningitis almost immediately, and as her father remained in the Far East, she was brought up by an aunt in London. She was educated at Francis Holland School for Girls in London and Sherborne School for Girls in 1925. She graduated with an external first class degree in English from the University of London in 1934.

== Teaching and public work ==
Reader Harris immediately joined the teaching staff at Sherborne School for Girls, then one of the foremost girls' boarding schools in England. During the war she was evacuated with a group of pupils from Sherborne to Branksome Hall School in Toronto, Ontario, Canada. This led to an exchange relationship between the two schools that was still operating seventy years later. She returned to England in 1943 to join the staff of the National Association of Girls' Clubs. She returned to Sherborne as headmistress in 1950, achieved eminence in her profession, and remained there until her retirement in 1975. According to an obituary, "Those who were pupils during her headship grew up in an atmosphere in which it was assumed that everyone had something of value to give, a better nature to be appealed to, and a duty to the community in which she lived."

While still at Sherborne, Reader Harris was involved in several outside bodies. In 1964 she became the chair of the Association of Headmistresses taking over from Enid Essame. She served till 1966 when she was organising the association's response to the Plowden Report. She was at various times a member of Dorset Education Committee, the Independent Television Authority, the councils of the National Youth Orchestra and the Outward Bound Trust, the Church Missionary Society, where as its first woman president she brought it to espouse the 1980 Brandt Report on bridging the North-South divide, and Christian Aid, where she was also chairman in 1978–1983. She joined the council of the Royal Society of Arts in 1975 and chaired it in 1979–1981. She was a governor of Godolphin School, Salisbury, from 1975 to 1986.

Reader Harris was an active member of the Church of England and a keen advocate of the ordination of women. As president of the CMS she attended the inauguration of the Church of North India in November 1970. She herself preached sermons in many churches, and became a lay canon after retiring to Salisbury in 1983. She was a popular speaker at functions and broadcast frequently. Her lifelong diaries are held by the school archives of Sherborne Girls.

A vivid glimpse of Reader Harris in old age appeared in a 1991 article by an anonymous former Sherborne pupil, published in India: "Dame Diana Reader Harris is no mean Third Ager herself. After retiring at the age of 63, she took on a bewildering array of offices in Church, educational and charitable organizations, including Chairmanship of Christian Aid." By the age of 79, she was losing her sight and fighting her way off as many committees as possible – "I can't read the minutes." "In spite of this, her account of her schedule for the week leaves me exhausted. Her problem, she says, is not boredom, but the opposite. The battle is to cling onto the Biblical injunction to 'be still and know that I am God' – the Hebrew, she says, suggests the idea of 'pause awhile and relax.' She lives with her sister-in-law and does all the cooking herself – at some risk to their guests, as 'I never know what I'm putting in.'"

== Honours ==
In 1972, Reader Harris was made a Dame Commander of the Order of the British Empire for "services to Education and the Church."
