= Harold Jameson =

Irish cricketer and Royal Marines officer

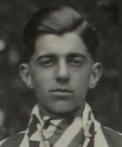

Personal information
- Full name: Harold Gordon Jameson
- Born: 25 January 1918; Dundrum, Ireland
- Died: 26 August 1940 (aged 22); Portsmouth, Hampshire, England
- Nickname: Peter
- Batting: Right-handed
- Bowling: Right-arm fast-medium

Domestic team information
- Years: Team
- 1938: Cambridge University

Career statistics
Competition	First-class
Matches	2
Runs scored	7
Batting average	2.33
100s/50s	–/–
Top score	4
Balls bowled	300
Wickets	2
Bowling average	102.00
5 wickets in innings	–
10 wickets in match	–
Best bowling	2/68
Catches/stumpings	–/–
- Source: Cricinfo, 12 January 2022

Harold Gordon Jameson (25 January 1918 — 26 August 1940) was an Irish first-class cricketer and Royal Marines officer.

The oldest son of the Reverend William Jameson and his wife Georgina Marjorie Gibbon, H G Jameson was born at Dundrum in January 1918. He was educated in England at Monkton Combe School, where his father was head of the junior school. From there he matriculated at Emmanuel College, Cambridge.

While studying at Cambridge, he made two first-class cricket appearances for Cambridge University Cricket Club in 1938, against the touring Australians and against Essex, with both matches played at Fenner's. He took two wickets against Essex, dismissing Alan Lavers and Tom Wade.

The Second World War began in the same year that Jameson graduated from Cambridge and he was commissioned into the Royal Marines as a temporary second lieutenant in June 1940. He was billeted at Fort Cumberland in Portsmouth and was one of eight marines killed during a German air raid on the fort on 26 August 1940, when a bomb struck a perimeter room in which they were gathered. Jameson was buried at the Royal Naval Cemetery, Haslar. His headstone reads: I will give him the morning star (Revelations 2.28).
