= Harold Gilbee Anderson =

English medical missionary

Harold Gilbee Anderson (1896–1977) was an English medical missionary who worked in western China. Anderson served as Medical Superintendent to the Church Missionary Society (CMS) from 1948-1959. Anderson based his mission around Evangelism, claiming that the goal of medical missions is to help men to find their "wholeness" in life.

== Early life and education ==
Harold Gilbee Anderson was born on May 26, 1896 at Safed. His father, Walter Henry Anderson, was a medical missionary in Palestine, under the Church Missions to Jews, while his mother was a secretary for Young Women's Christian Association. His mother died of Blackwater fever in Haifa in 1898. Between 1907 and 1915, he attended Monkton Combe School, where he first heard the call to missionary service.

Anderson went into war service with both the British and American Expeditionary Forces in France, where he was captain of the Royal West Kent Regiment (1915-1919). Afterwards, he was a superintendent at a hospital slum mission from 1920-1923. He earned his master degrees and received Member of the Royal College of Surgeons of England (MRCS) and Licentiate of the Royal College of Physicians (LRCP) certifications.

In 1925, after his war service in France, he entered St. Bartholomew's Hospital where he received his Membership of the Royal Colleges of Physicians (MRCP), M.B, B.S. from London and held the post of Senior house physician. He was accepted by CMS and sailed to China for his missionary trip, where he later obtained his medical degree in 1934.

Anderson married Eleanor Waverly McNeil, on April 29, 1927 but she died in London on February 15, 1950; he remarried a year later to Elizabeth France who was formerly of CMS H.Q. staff.

== Career and journey ==
In October 15, 1924, Anderson was accepted to be a missionary by the Church Missionary Society. On March 5, 1926 he was sent on to his mission to Western China, Meinchu. He began his association with the West China Union University, Chengdu in 1926 but was interrupted for a year by the 1926 Chinese Revolution, also known as the Northern Expedition.

The hospital that Anderson was working in, was supposed to accommodate one hundred and ten patients; on one day they had seven hundred patients. During this time of upheaval, there was crowding in the hospital due to the number of wounded soldiers. This took its toll as diseases spread to the hospital's staff, and Anderson came down with influenza that later turned into typhus fever.

Anderson and his wife sought refuge in Australia, Adelaide, during the 1926 Chinese revolution; this provided an opportunity in 1927 to found the CMS Youth Fellowship in South Australia. Anderson returned to Chengdu.

During Anderson's time at the hospital, two teachers from Hong Kong University became his patients after a motor-bus accident outside of Chengdu, eventually leading to cooperation between the two universities.

In 1931 he was awarded a Research Fellowship at Lester Institute, Shanghai.

In 1932, Anderson was approved by the executive missionary and both university authorities, Hong Kong University and West China Union University, to conduct a 6 month research fellowship at Henry Lester Institute of Medical Research in Shanghai. He completed a short monograph on tuberculosis in West China.

By 1933, Anderson left China and went back to England through Australia. From 1934-1935, he served as an acting physician and secretary, acting as a locum for and succeeding J. H. Cook as CMS Medical Secretary at Salisbury Square, London.

In 1935, Anderson went back to Chengdu where the executive committee approved of him joining Barely in a far east tour of CMS. and reported back on his journey. Anderson was later asked by CMS to relinquish his work in Chengdu to take up a role as physician to the Society on the Home staff, and as the secretary in charge of the CMS Medical Missions.

Anderson traveled back to England in 1938 where he was appointed as a physician society, an administrator of the Church Missionary Society, and as secretary to the medical community. The Medical Commission's report of 1939 is a landmark in the history of CMS medical missions, and Anderson's passion was translating its recommendations from paper to practice.

He resigned as a medical superintendent on January 21, 1959, but the resignation wasn't effective until September of that year.

== Death ==
Anderson died on October 6, 1977, in Painswick, Gloucester, England.

His papers are held in the Cadbury Research Library, University of Birmingham.
