= Thomas Watson (cricketer, born 1913) =

English cricketer (1913–1994)

Personal information
- Full name: Thomas Mead Watson
- Born: 22 May 1913; Lewisham, Kent, England
- Died: 7 August 1994 (aged 81); Bath, Somerset, England
- Batting: Left-handed

Domestic team information
- Years: Team
- 1933–1935: Oxford University

Career statistics
Competition	First-class
Matches	3
Runs scored	92
Batting average	18.40
100s/50s	–/–
Top score	27
Catches/stumpings	1/–
- Source: Cricinfo, 7 June 2020

Thomas Mead Watson (22 May 1913 – 7 August 1994) was an English first-class cricketer and educator.

Watson was born at Lewisham in May 1913. He was educated at Monkton Combe School, before going up to Balliol College, Oxford. While studying at Oxford, he made three appearances in first-class cricket for Oxford University, playing against a combined Minor Counties cricket team in 1933, Gloucestershire in 1934 and Yorkshire in 1935. He scored 92 runs in his three matches, with a high score of 27.

After graduating from Oxford, he returned to Monkton Combe where he taught French. He served in the Somerset Light Infantry of the British Army during the Second World War before being commissioned as a second lieutenant in March 1941. His service number was 176040. He was later commissioned by the Marylebone Cricket Club to write Le Jeu de Cricket, a guide to cricket in French. Watson died in Bath in August 1994.
