= Arthur Sellick =

English cricketer

Personal information
- Full name: Arthur Samuel Sellick
- Born: 20 September 1878; South Hamlet, Gloucester, England
- Died: 16 January 1958 (aged 79); St Helier, London, England
- Role: Batsman

Domestic team information
- Years: Team
- 1903–1904: Gloucestershire
- 1905: Somerset
- FC debut: 22 June 1903 Gloucestershire v London County
- Last FC: 4 July 1905 Somerset v Lancashire

Career statistics
Competition	First-class
Matches	17
Runs scored	298
Batting average	12.41
100s/50s	0/0
Top score	49
Balls bowled	96
Wickets	0
Bowling average	–
5 wickets in innings	–
10 wickets in match	–
Best bowling	–
Catches/stumpings	8/–
- Source: CricketArchive, 10 July 2010

Arthur Samuel Sellick (20 September 1878 – 16 January 1958) was a first-class cricketer who played for Gloucestershire and Somerset. He was born at South Hamlet, Gloucester and died at St Helier, Carshalton, Surrey.

Sellick played primarily as a batsman for both Gloucestershire and Somerset, but it is not known whether he was right- or left-handed, and in his first-class career he had no settled batting position, sometimes opening the innings but at other times appearing as low as No 10 in the batting order.

Sellick appeared in two match for Gloucestershire in the 1903 and then played nine times in 1904 making, in the match against Yorkshire at Dewsbury, his highest first-class score of 49. In 1905, he played six matches for Somerset but in 10 innings he managed only 40 runs.

Sellick did not play first-class cricket after the 1905 season, but he had a long career as a player in Minor Counties cricket for Wiltshire, starting in 1911 and playing his last game in 1926.

He was employed as the cricket professional at Monkton Combe School during the 1920s and appears in several of the team photographs of the time.
