= Herbert Lankester =

English medical missionary

- Born: Leicester, England
- Occupation: Medical Missionary
- Era: Late 1800s
- Notable work: Medical Mission Auxiliary Fund Committee Minutes

Herbert Lankester was an English medical missionary. He led the Church Missionary Society (CMS) for thirty years. His research shifted the role of medical missionaries from agents of religion to agents of health care, leading to the twentieth century model of medical missionaries.

== Early life ==
Lankester was born in Leicester in 1862 and lived most of his life in England. He died in 1947. His father was Henry Lankester who was a doctor who became mayor of Leicester in 1889. Lankester had four brothers and one sister (Rachel). Two of his brothers (Cecil and Arthur) became doctors and medical missionaries in India and a third (Francis) became a dentist.

== Missionary call ==
Lankester served as a leader for the Church Missionary Society examining board in addition to his role as a secretary. He retired in 1926 after serving there for 30 years During this period, he served as Secretary of the Auxiliary Committee on Medical Missions, Society Physician, Home Secretary and General Secretary. He published numerous papers as the Honorary Secretary of Committee. In Occasional Paper 1, Lankester wrote an Appeal to the Medical Mission Auxiliary Fund Committee. Lankester worked as a researcher. He enjoyed reading and studying why people became ill. He read every book of medicine that was available at the time.

== His work ==
Lankester was thoroughly involved with researching health care. He was especially interested in seeing how to better supply medicine to those who needed it around the world. As a long time London resident, Lankester focused his work on rural England. According to records, he supplied medical aid to the London countryside. He set up a tent on the side of one of the main roads outside a small village. He treated many different local people as well as people who traveled to seek his help. He had no real way of promoting his medical services beyond word of mouth. He treated people with a range of illnesses including smallpox, yellow fever, cholera, typhoid, polio and diphtheria.

He started work in England and eventually branched out to other countries. Lankester apparently did not work closely with other medical missionaries, preferring to work independently. His greatest individual medical mission was a three-month stay in the London countryside.

== Legacy ==
Lankester was one of the first and most trusted medical missionaries. Instead of clergymen traveling the countryside, he wanted public perception of medical missionaries to be heroes spreading health and the Gospel. Lankester traveled across London communicating about medical missionaries. He had trouble conveying what medical missionary work was. He is best known for the studying and research he conducted, as well as his supply of medicine and vaccines to those in the near-London countryside.

== Sources ==
- Arumugam, Thiru (2009). Nineteenth Century American Medical Missionaries in Jaffna, Ceylon: with Special Reference to Samuel Fisk Green. Sydney: MV Publications, South Asian Studies Centre. ISBN 9780646520902. OCLC 592432311.
- Connor, Jennifer (2000). Guardians of Medical Knowledge: The Genesis of the Medical Library Association. Medical Library Association. ISBN 0810834707.
- Grundmann, Christoffer H. (2014). Sent to Heal!: Emergence and Development of Medical Missions. Centre for Contemporary Christianity. ISBN 9789380548685. OCLC 893578353.
- Lankester, Herbert. "AMD - Secure Access Management". churchmissionarysociety.amdigital.co.uk.
- Lankester, Herbert (1906). Students and the Modern Missionary Crusade: Addresses Delivered Before the Fifth International Convention of the Student Volunteer Movement for Foreign Missions, Nashville, Tennessee, February 28– March 4, 1906. New York: Student Volunteer Movement for Foreign Missions. pp. 499–503.
