= Allan Rutter =

English cricketer (born 1928)

Allen Edward Henry Rutter
Personal information
- Full name: Allen Edward Henry Rutter
- Born: 24 December 1928 (age 97); Bickley, Kent, England
- Nickname: Claude
- Batting: Right-handed

Domestic team information
- Years: Team
- 1962–1965: Norfolk
- 1955: Free Foresters
- 1953: Cambridge University
- 1948–1955: Wiltshire

Career statistics
Competition	First-class	List A
Matches	3	1
Runs scored	49	7
Batting average	12.25	7.00
100s/50s	–/–	–/–
Top score	45	7
Balls bowled	–	–
Wickets	–	–
Bowling average	–	–
5 wickets in innings	–	–
10 wickets in match	–	–
Best bowling	–	–
Catches/stumpings	–/–	–/–
- Source: Cricinfo, 29 June 2011

Allen Edward Henry Rutter, known as Claude Rutter (born 24 December 1928) is an English retired Church of England priest and former cricketer.

== Early life ==
Rutter was born in Bickley, Kent, to Revd Norman Rutter and his wife Hilda Rutter (née Mason). He was educated at Monkton Combe School (Preparatory Department) near Bath, Somerset and Dauntsey's School in West Lavington, Wiltshire, before going on to Queens' College, Cambridge where he graduated with a BA degree (later converted to MA) and a Diploma in Agriculture.

== Cricket ==
Rutter was a right-handed batsman. At Cambridge University he served on the Committee of Queens' College Cricket Club and played regularly for the University's reserve team, the Crusaders. He made his debut in county cricket for Wiltshire in the 1948 Minor Counties Championship against the Kent Second XI. Rutter played Minor counties cricket for Wiltshire from 1948 to 1955, which included 44 appearances in the Minor Counties Championship. While playing for Wiltshire, he made 2 first-class appearances for Cambridge University against Sussex and Surrey in 1953. He was also the subject of an unusual stumping episode in 1948, described in Bats, Balls and Bails by Les Scott, in which Rutter was recalled to the crease to continue batting against Kent County Cricket Club Second XI after having already returned to the dressing room. Two years later, he played a single first-class match for the Free Foresters against Cambridge University. In his 3 first-class matches, he scored 49 runs at an average of 12.25, with a high score of 45. This score came for the Free Foresters in 1955.

Joining Norfolk in 1962, he made his debut for the county in that seasons Minor Counties Championship against Staffordshire. He played for the county from 1962 to 1965, making 12 Minor Counties Championship appearances. In 1965, he made his only List A appearance for Norfolk against Hampshire in the Gillette Cup. In this match, he was dismissed for 7 runs by Butch White.

== Church of England ==
Rutter spent three years as a scientific liaison officer at East Malling Research Station, then studied theology at Cranmer Hall, St John's College, Durham. He was ordained as a Church of England deacon in 1959 and priest in 1960 and served in various English parishes and in Gingindhlovu, Zululand (now KwaZulu-Natal), culminating in appointment as prebendary of Salisbury Cathedral 1986–1996. He then officially retired but served as vicar and RAF chaplain on Ascension Island 1996–1997, and as priest-in-charge of the parishes of Thorncombe with Forde Abbey, Winsham and Cricket St Thomas (on the border of Dorset and Somerset) 1999–2000.
