= Harvey Cox =

American theologian (born 1929)

The Reverend Harvey Cox
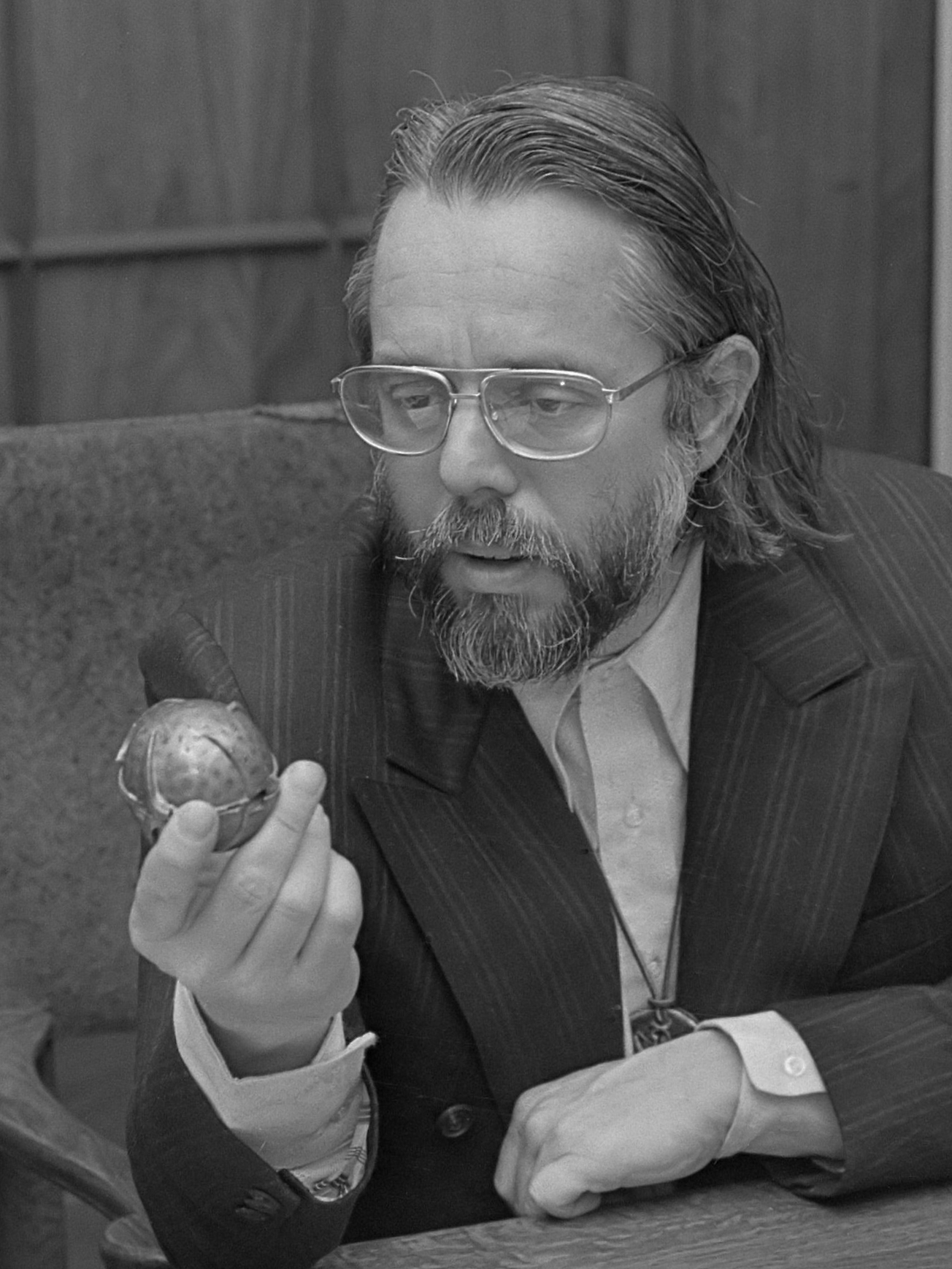
- Cox examining a Honeywell fragmentation device in 1973
- Born: Harvey Gallagher Cox Jr. May 19, 1929 (age 97); Phoenixville, Pennsylvania, US
- Spouses: Nancy Nieburger (m. 1957; div.); Nina Tumarkin (m. 1986)

Ecclesiastical career
- Religion: Christianity (Baptist)
- Church: American Baptist Churches USA
- Ordained: 1957

Academic background
- Education: University of Pennsylvania; Yale University; Harvard University
- Doctoral advisor: James Luther Adams
- Influences: Karl Barth; Dietrich Bonhoeffer

Academic work
- Discipline: Theology
- School or tradition: Secular theology
- Institutions: Andover Newton Theological School; Harvard University
- Notable works: The Secular City (1965)

Harvey Gallagher Cox Jr. (born May 19, 1929) is an American theologian and Baptist minister who served as the Hollis Professor of Divinity at Harvard Divinity School, until his retirement in October 2009. Cox's research and teaching focus on theological developments in world Christianity, including liberation theology and the role of Christianity in Latin America.

== Early life and education ==
Cox was born on May 19, 1929, in Phoenixville, Pennsylvania, to Dorothea Cox and Harvey Gallagher. He was raised in Malvern, Pennsylvania. After a stint in the US Merchant Marine, Cox attended the University of Pennsylvania and graduated in 1951 with a Bachelor of Arts degree with honors in history. He earned a Bachelor of Divinity degree from Yale Divinity School in 1955, and a Doctor of Philosophy degree in the history and philosophy of religion from Harvard University in 1963.

== Career ==
Cox was ordained as an American Baptist minister in 1957, and started teaching as an assistant professor at the Andover Newton Theological School in Massachusetts. He then began teaching at Harvard Divinity School (HDS) in 1965 and in 1969 became a full professor. He was to become "the single most heeded professor in religion at Harvard."

Cox became widely known with the publication of The Secular City in 1965. It became immensely popular and influential for a book on theology, selling over one million copies. Cox developed the thesis that the church is primarily a people of faith and action, rather than an institution. He argued that "God is just as present in the secular as the religious realms of life". Thus, the original title was God and the Secular City, which "he still believes… would have more accurately described the book's theme."

Far from being a protective religious community, the church should be in the forefront of change in society, celebrating the new ways religiosity is finding expression in the world. Phrases such as "intrinsic conservatism prevents the denominational churches from leaving their palaces behind and stepping into God's permanent revolution in history" were viewed as threatening to the status quo by some, or seen as an embrace of the social revolution of the 1960s. Cox revisited his topic in Religion in the Secular City: Toward a Post-Modern Theology in 1984. In 1990, a twenty-fifth anniversary edition of The Secular City was published.

After his international best seller, Cox thought he might have "peaked" too soon at age 34, as he experienced a "second book crisis," but he then wrote The Feast of Fools (1969), which he has said "still remains my own favorite ... the 'one book' I recommend to people who ask me at parties which one of my books they should crack." Originally Cox presented it as the William Belden Noble Lecture at Harvard in 1968, which included music, dance, film, and balloons; and Cox himself was known to play the tenor saxophone in a jazz ensemble called The Embraceables. Celebrating his new book as Dionysian in playful dynamic with The Secular City as Apollonian, he said "there is an unnecessary gap in today's world between the world changers and the life-celebrators," thus promoting a "proleptic liberation as a festive radical."

In 1973, Cox wrote The Seduction of the Spirit, which he said "has the best first chapter of anything I have ever written (about my boyhood in Malvern, Pennsylvania, the churches there and my baptism)," but he added it went "downhill" from there.

In Turning East (1977), Cox describes his teaching at the Naropa Institute in Boulder, Colorado, where his mind and soul were challenged by the Buddhist "dharma", and he enjoyed doing research in Asian religious movements.

At times Cox has been criticized as "faddish", responding to the current "hot topics", against which he has asserted he is responding to the pastoral issues of the church confronting the world and he sees himself as a "church theologian", influenced by Karl Barth's Church Dogmatics. In fact, Cox entered HDS as a faculty member in the Department of the Church and later served as the Chair of the Department of Applied Theology. Throughout his years as a church theologian, Cox was "visible, indeed as no other on the Divinity faculty."

Cox became the first to introduce liberation theology at HDS, with its understanding of Jesus the Liberator and God's preference for the poor, drawing on his first-hand experience in a training center in Venezuela. Later he defended Leonardo Boff, a Latin American theologian, in his book The Silencing of Leonardo Boff: The Vatican and Future Christianity (1988).

Cox was concerned with the encounter of Christianity with religious pluralism, especially as the Center for the Study of World Religions at HDS offered opportunities for engagement with scholars of different faiths, which he wrote about in Many Mansions: A Christian's Encounter with Other Faiths (1988), his book that advocated speaking in interfaith dialogue from your own Christian identity as part of the discussion.

In keeping with his alertness to global Christianity, Cox was drawn to the ecumenical nature of Pentecostalism in Protestantism, Catholicism, and Orthodoxy, that he wrote about in his book Fire From Heaven: The Rise of Pentecostal Spirituality and the Reshaping of Religion in the Twenty-First Century (1995), which might be useful for academic Christianity as well as the church and its leaders as they encounter the challenge of Pentecostalism. Thus, Cox has maintained that HDS is an ecumenical seminary, not a nondenominational seminary, at which students from different faiths engage in dialogue and do not seek a generic form of religion or Christianity.

An outgrowth of Cox's second marriage to Nina Tumarkin, a devout Jew and a professor of Russian history at Wellesley College, was his book Common Prayers: Faith, Family, and a Christian's Journey Through the Jewish Year (2002), a look by an equally devout Christian at the Jewish year through its major holidays.

Cox retired in 2009. His book The Future of Faith was released to coincide with his retirement. The Future of Faith explores three important trends in Christianity's 2,000 years. He views the religion's first three centuries as the Age of Faith, when followers simply embraced the teachings of Jesus. Then came the Age of Belief, in which church leaders increasingly took control and set acceptable limits on doctrine and orthodoxy. The last 50 years, Cox contends, welcome in the Age of the Spirit, in which Christians have begun to ignore dogma and embrace spirituality, while finding common threads with other religions.

In How to Read the Bible (2015), Cox shows how three different ways of approaching the Bible, the narrative (the stories), the historical (the academic), and the spiritual (personal and social) can be reconciled as a contemporary source of enrichment for all.

In 2016, Cox's book The Market as God conceives of the free market in a theological framework. The book proposes that the market economy can be understood as a religion.

In A New Heaven (2022), Cox explores the question of heaven and the afterlife by reflecting on his personal stories and drawing on perspectives on death across cultures and religions.

== Personal life ==
In 1957, Cox married Nancy Neiburger. Their marriage ended in divorce. In 1987, Cox married Nina Tumarkin. Cox has four children and lives in Cambridge, Mass.

== Books ==
- The Secular City: Secularization and Urbanization in Theological Perspective (1965), Collier Books, 25th anniversary edition 1990: ISBN 0-02-031155-9
- God's Revolution and Man's Responsibilities (1966) no ISBN issued
- On Not Leaving It to the Snake (1967), Macmillan, S.C.M. Press 3rd edition 1968: ISBN 978-0-33401169-9
- The Feast of Fools: A Theological Essay on Festivity and Fantasy (1969), Harvard University Press, ISBN 0-674-29525-0, Harper & Row 1970 paperback: ISBN 0-06-080272-3, HarperCollins 2000 paperback: ISBN 0-06-090212-4
- The Seduction of the Spirit: The Use and Misuse of People's Religion (1973), Touchstone edition 1985: ISBN 0-671-21728-3
- Turning East: Why Americans Look to the Orient for Spirituality-And What That Search Can Mean to the West (1978), Simon & Schuster, ISBN 0-671-24405-1
- Just as I am (autobiography), Nashville, TN: Abingdon, 1983.
- Religion in the Secular City: Toward a Postmodern Theology (1985), Simon & Schuster, ISBN 0-671-52805-X
- Many Mansions: A Christian's Encounter with Other Faiths (1988), Beacon Press reprint 1992: ISBN 0-8070-1213-0
- The Silencing of Leonardo Boff: The Vatican and the Future of World Christianity (1988) ISBN 0-940989-35-2
- Fire from Heaven: The Rise of Pentecostal Spirituality and the Re-shaping of Religion in the 21st Century (1994), Decapo Press reprint 2001: ISBN 0-306-81049-2
- Religion in a Secular City: Essays in Honor of Harvey Cox, Harvey Cox, Arvind Sharma eds. (2001), Trinity Press, ISBN 1-56338-337-3
- Common Prayers: Faith, Family, and a Christian's Journey Through the Jewish Year (2002), Mariner Books, ISBN 0-618-25733-0 (paperback)
- When Jesus Came to Harvard: Making Moral Choices Today, (2004), Houghton Mifflin, ISBN 0-618-06744-2 (hardcover)
- The Future of Faith (2009), HarperOne, ISBN 0-06-175552-4 (hardcover)
- How to Read the Bible (2015) HarperOne, ISBN 978-0-06234315-4 (hardcover)
- The Market as God (2016) Harvard University Press, ISBN 978-0-67465968-1 (hardcover)
- A New Heaven (2022) Orbis Books, ISBN 978-1-62698-458-5 (harcover)
