= Liberal theism =

Belief in the existence of a deity without adhering to an established religion

Liberal theism is the philosophical and religious belief in the existence of a deity without adhering to an established religion.

The exact definition is debatable. Liberal theists often believe that, "all religions lead to the truth." Liberal theists are often influenced by the beliefs in their culture. For example, a liberal theist in the United States is likely to have beliefs strongly influenced by Christianity. It can also be said that all religions began as a form of liberal theism.

Liberal theists are more likely to be proponents of moral relativism than moral absolutism. They often claim that there are no black and white concepts, but instead only subjective beliefs. Liberal theism should not be confused with Liberation Theology.

Liberalism can also exist in established religions, such as Christianity, Judaism, or Islam.

A key aspect of Liberal Theism is the idea that classical theism can be modified. This means a Liberal Christian may not, for example, conform entirely to the description of God in the Bible. He/she would say that we can redefine God. They generally argue that people 2,000 years ago did not necessarily have the correct idea.

Christians who subscribe to liberal theism do not believe the Bible to be inerrant, either on scientific, theological, or moral topics.

Liberal Theism can be seen as a response to the problem of evil argument against the existence of God. The problem of evil suggests that an "all good" and "all powerful" God could not possibly endorse or allow evil actions to occur, for example, the Holocaust. A liberal theist may suggest that perhaps God is not all powerful, that perhaps God is just the "most powerful". That is, that God cannot control some things. This allows for us to say that humans can use their own innate reason to act in an evil way.

Liberal Theism also provides an answer to the question, "If God is all powerful, then can he create a rock that not even he can pick up?". A classical theist may spend a lifetime pondering this question without figuring out an adequate answer, but a liberal theist would say that either God is not all powerful, after all, or that it is a moot point since God would not bother in such petty issues as creating and moving rocks.

== See also ==
- Liberal Christianity
- Classical theism
- Religious liberalism
- Theism
