= Patience Strong =

British poet

Winifred Emma May (4 June 1907 – 28 August 1990) was a poet from the United Kingdom, best known for her work under the pen name Patience Strong. Her poems were usually short, simple and imbued with sentimentality, the beauty of nature and inner strength. She was also a successful lyricist, composing English words for the tango "Jealousy" and "The Dream of Olwen", and an author of several books dealing with Christianity and practical psychology.

== Early life ==
Born in Catford, London, she was the second daughter of Alfred and Nell May. Her older sister was called Connie and her younger brother was always referred to as 'Boy'. In her early life Winifred attended Sunday School and was a frequent user of the local library. She and Connie enjoyed reading and poetry, and at night they would spend many hours reciting poems to each other. The family spent many happy holidays at Brighton and, later in her life, Winifred moved to the country and was inspired by the natural cycles of nature which figure in many of her poems.

The May family regularly attended the music hall and their house was often filled with singing and whistling. Winifred showed an early aptitude for the piano and showed enough ability to regularly accompany local amateur singing groups. Following a period at Cusack's College where she took a secretarial course she found employment in a patent agency. It was about this time that she started submitting poems for publication. Her first poem earned her 1 guinea and it appeared in Nash’s magazine in 1922. This was followed by other poems appearing in The Strand and Good Housekeeping.

== Musical career ==
Her musical talent led to her being engaged by The Manor Mount Club in Forest Hill where she met the composer Frederick Drummond. He set the words of her "To Sing Awhile" to music which was then published by Keith Prowse. Subsequently, she was offered full-time employment with the company. At 21 years of age she had more than 100 published songs to her credit, the most famous being the English words for Jacob Gade's tango "Jealousy", which was later recorded by a number of artists including Hutch, Gracie Fields, Vera Lynn, Richard Tauber and Billy Fury. Winifred later claimed to have written the song in fifteen minutes after having the haunting tango tune played to her over the telephone by Lawrence Wright. In 1930 she composed a song for the 4th birthday of Princess Elizabeth (later Queen Elizabeth II) which was recorded by Webster Booth.

== Popular poet ==
In 1935, she asked The Daily Mirror for a regular publication of her poems. The features editor asked her to return the following day with eighteen new poems and a suggested pseudonym. This she did with the pseudonym of Patience Strong, a name she took from a book of the same name by Adeline Dutton Train Whitney. Her daily poems, in The Quiet Corner, continued throughout World War II until 1946 when her column was transferred to the Sunday Pictorial (later The Sunday Mirror) and continued for several decades. She also contributed poems to the weekly magazine Woman's Own and latterly to the quarterly magazine, This England. Her poems were also published in various anthologies and she made two records reciting her poems.

== Personal life ==
Winifred May married Frederick Arnold Williams, an architect, in 1931. They enjoyed a happy, childless marriage until he died in 1965. Two years later she married Guy Cushing, a retired buyer for a departmental store. He died in 1979. Winifred was made a Freeman of the City of London in 1970. She died at her home in Sedlescombe, Sussex.

== Selected bibliography ==
- Quiet Corner (1936)
- Quiet Thoughts (1937)
- Quiet Corner Reflections (1938)
- A Christmas Garland (1948)
- The Harvest Of Dreams (1948)
- Wayside Glory (1948)
- The Morning Watch (1951)
- The Patience Strong Bedside Book (1953)
- "Beyond the Rainbow" (1957)
- The Blessings of the Years (1963)
- Come Happy Day (1966)
- Give me a Quiet Corner (1972)
- A Joy Forever (1973)
- With a Poem in My Pocket (Autobiography, 1981)
- Poems from the Fighting Forties (1982)
- Fifty Golden Years (1985, to commemorate her fiftieth anniversary as Patience Strong)
- Tapestries of Time (1991)

== Recordings ==
Patience Strong released two spoken‑word albums in the United Kingdom, featuring readings of her poetry accompanied by organ.

- The Quiet Hour (1963) – Spoken‑word LP featuring Patience Strong reading her poetry, accompanied by organist Leslie Pearson. Released in the UK on Saga, Society, Boulevard and Fidelity in multiple editions.
- The Magic of Patience Strong (1978) – Spoken‑word LP featuring Strong reading her poetry, accompanied by organist Gavin Deards. Released on the UK label Contour.
