= Church Mission Society =

British mission society

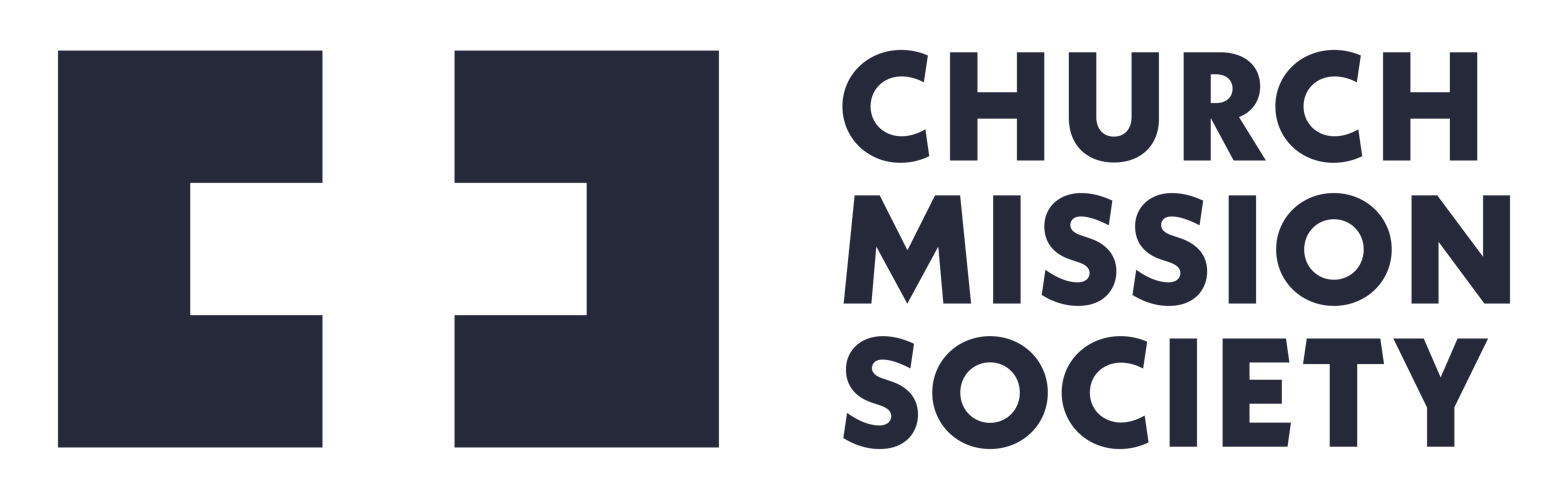
- Abbreviation: CMS
- Formation: 12 April 1799; 227 years ago
- Founder: Clapham Sect
- Type: Evangelical Anglicanism; Ecumenism; Protestant missionary British Commonwealth
- Headquarters: Oxford, England
- Chief Executive Officer: Andy Roberts as of July 2025
- Website: Official website

The Church Mission Society (CMS), formerly known as the Church Missionary Society, is a British Anglican mission society working internationally with Christians. CMS was founded in 1799, and has given its name "CMS" to a number of daughter organisations around the world, including Australia and New Zealand, which have now become independent.

== History ==
=== Foundation ===
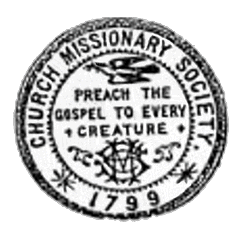
The logo of Church Missionary Society in 1799

The original proposal for the mission came from Charles Grant and George Udny of the East India Company and David Brown, of Calcutta, who sent a proposal in 1787 to William Wilberforce, then a young member of parliament, and Charles Simeon, a young clergyman at Cambridge University.

The Society for Missions to Africa and the East (as the society was first called) was founded on 12 April 1799 at a meeting of the Eclectic Society, supported by members of the Clapham Sect, a group of activist Anglicans who met under the guidance of John Venn, the Rector of Clapham. Their number included Charles Simeon, Basil Woodd, Henry Thornton, Thomas Babington and William Wilberforce. Wilberforce was asked to be the first president of the society, but he declined to take on this role and became a vice-president. The treasurer was Henry Thornton and the founding secretary was Thomas Scott, a biblical commentator. Many of the founders were also involved in creating the Sierra Leone Company and the Society for the Education of Africans.

The first missionaries went out in 1804. They came from the Evangelical-Lutheran Church in Württemberg and had trained at the Berlin Seminary. The name Church Missionary Society began to be used and in 1812 the society was renamed The Church Missionary Society.

In 1829, the CMS began to send medical personnel as missionaries. Initially to care for the mission staff, these missionaries could also care for the physical well-being of local populations. Dr. Henry Graham was the first CMS Medical missionary when he was sent to Sierra Leone and shifted the focus from care of the mission staff to assistance for local people. Medical missionaries in the late 19th century, like Herbert Lankester, also served in rural England. Lankester was secretary at the time the Auxiliary Committee on Medical Missions (founded 1891) of the society merged into or became the Medical Committee (1898).

=== Training ===
During the late 19th and early 20th century, the CMS maintained a training programme for women at Kennaway Hall at the former "Willows" estate where the training programme started. Kennaway Hall was the Church Missionary Society training center for female missionaries. The training center was called "The Willows", under the Mildmay Trustees, until having been bought by the Church Missionary Society in 1891. Elizabeth Mary Wells took over the presidency in 1918 of Kennaway Hall.

=== 20th century ===
During the early 20th century, the society's theology moved in a more liberal direction under the leadership of Eugene Stock. There was considerable debate over the possible introduction of a doctrinal test for missionaries, which advocates claimed would restore the society's original evangelical theology. In 1922, the society split, with the liberal evangelicals remaining in control of CMS headquarters, whilst conservative evangelicals established the Bible Churchmen's Missionary Society (BCMS, now Crosslinks).

In 1957 the Church of England Zenana Missionary Society was absorbed into the CMS.

Notable general secretaries of the society later in the 20th century were Max Warren and John Vernon Taylor. The first woman president of the CMS, Diana Reader Harris (serving 1969–1982), was instrumental in persuading the society to back the 1980 Brandt Report on bridging the North-South divide. In the 1990s CMS appointed its first non-British general secretary, Michael Nazir-Ali, who later became Bishop of Rochester in the Church of England, and its first women general secretary, Diana Witts. Gillian Joynson-Hicks was its president from 1998 to 2007.

In 1995 the name was changed to the Church Mission Society.

At the end of the 20th century there was a significant swing back to the Evangelical position, probably in part due to a review in 1999 at the anniversary and also due to the re-integration of Mid Africa Ministry (formerly the Ruanda Mission). The position of CMS is now that of an ecumenical Evangelical society.

=== 21st century ===
In 2004 CMS was instrumental in bringing together a number of Anglican and, later, some Protestant mission agencies to form Faith2Share, an international network of mission agencies.

In June 2007, CMS in Britain moved the administrative office out of London for the first time. It is now based in east Oxford.

In 2008, CMS was acknowledged as a mission community by the Advisory Council on the Relations of Bishops and Religious Communities of the Church of England. It currently has approximately 2,800 members who commit to seven promises, aspiring to live a lifestyle shaped by mission.

In 2010 CMS integrated with the South American Mission Society (SAMS).

In 2010 Church Mission Society launched the Pioneer Mission Leadership Training programme, providing leadership training for both lay people and those preparing for ordination as pioneer ministers. It is accredited by Durham University as part of the Church of England's Common Awards. In 2015 there were 70 students on the course, studying at certificate, diploma and MA level.

In October 2012, Philip Mounstephen became the Executive Leader of the Church Mission Society.

On 31 January 2016 Church Mission Society had 151 mission partners in 30 countries and 62 local partners in 26 countries (this programme supports local mission leaders in Asia, Africa and South America in "pioneer settings") serving in Africa, Asia, Europe and the Middle East. In addition, 127 mission associates (affiliated to Church Mission Society but not employed or financially supported through CMS) and 16 short-termers. In 2015–16, Church Mission Society had a budget of £6.8 million, drawn primarily from donations by individuals and parishes, supplemented by historic investments.

The Church Mission Society Archive is housed at the University of Birmingham Special Collections.

In Australia, the society operates on two levels: firstly, at a national/federal level as 'CMS Australia', training and supporting various missionaries; and secondly, at a state level with 6 Branches, recruiting missionaries and liaising with supporters and support churches.

== Leadership ==
Secretary or Honorary Secretary

- Thomas Scott (1799–1802)
- Josiah Pratt (1802–1824)
- Edward Bickersteth (1824–1831)
- Charles Hodgson (1832-
- Henry Venn (1841–1872)
- Henry Wright (1872–1880)
- Frederic Wigram (1880–1895)
- Henry E. Fox (from 1895)

President

- Admiral Gambier (first President, 1812–1834)
- Henry Pelham, 3rd Earl of Chichester (1834–1886)
- Captain the Hon. Francis Maude (1886–1887)
- Sir John Kennaway, 3rd Baronet (1887–1919)
- 1969 to 1982: Diana Reader Harris
- 1986: David Bleakley
- 1998 to 2007: Gillian Joynson-Hicks

=== CEO (with title changes) ===
General Secretary

- 1942 to 1963: Max Warren
- 1963 to 1973: John Taylor
- 1975 to 1985: Simon Barrington-Ward
- 1986-1990: Harry Moore
- 1989 to 1994: Michael Nazir-Ali
- 1995 to 2000: Diana Witts
- 2000 to 2011: Tim Dakin

Executive Leader

- October 2012 to 2018: Philip Mounstephen

Chief Executive Officer

- From May 2019: Alastair Bateman
- From July 2025: Andy Roberts

=== Clinical leadership ===
Medical Superintendent

- Coral Wong (1927-1948)
- Harold Gilbee Anderson (1938-1959)

== See also ==
- Christian mission
- Timeline of Christian missions
- Church Missionary Society in the Middle East and North Africa
- Church Missionary Society in Africa
- Church Missionary Society in India
- Church Missionary Society in China
- Mary Fauriel Lockett

== Bibliography ==
- Groten, Miel. "Gates to the 'Heathen World.'" in The Architecture of Empire in Modern Europe: Space, Place, and the Construction of an Imperial Environment, 1860-1960 (Amsterdam University Press, 2022), pp. 41–84. online in JSTOR
- Harris, John W. (1998). We wish we'd done more: Ninety years of CMS and Aboriginal issues in north Australia. Adelaide: Openbook Publishers. ISBN 0859108961.
- Hewitt, Gordon, The Problems of Success, A History of the Church Missionary Society 1910–1942, Vol I (1971) In Tropical Africa. The Middle East. At Home ISBN 0-334-00252-4; Vol II (1977)Asia Overseas Partners ISBN 0-334-01313-5
- McGregor, A. W. (1904). English–Kikuyu Vocabulary. London: Society for Promoting Christian Knowledge. OL 23468442M.
- Murray, Jocelyn (1985). Proclaim the Good News. A Short History of the Church Missionary Society. London: Hodder & Stoughton. ISBN 0-340-34501-2..
- Porter, Andrew, ed. The Imperial Horizons of British Protestant Missions, 1880–1914. (2003).
- Stock, Eugene (1899–1916). The History of the Church Missionary Society: Its Environment, Its Men, and Its Work. Vol. 1–4. London: CMS..
- Stock, Eugene (1923). The Recent Controversy in the C.M.S. (Reprinted from the Church Missionary Review ed.). London: CMS..
- Ward, Kevin, and Brian Stanley, eds. The Church Mission Society and World Christianity, 1799-1999 (Eerdmans, 2000). online
- Ward, Kevin. A History of Global Anglicanism (Cambridge University Press, 2006). online
- Missionary Register; containing an abstract of the principal missionary and bible societies throughout the world. From 1816, containing the principal transactions of the various institutions for propagating the gospel with the proceedings at large of the Church Missionary Society. They were published from 1813 to 1855 by L. B. Seeley & Sons, London

Some are online readable and downloadable at Google Books; 1814, 1815, 1822, 1823, 1826, 1828, 1829, 1831, 1834, 1846.
