= Max Alexander Cunningham Warren =

Irish Anglican missionary

Max Warren (1904–1977) was General secretary of the Church Missionary Society (CMS) and canon of Westminster Abbey.

== Biography ==
Warren was born in Dún Laoghaire in Ireland on 13 August 1904. He was the youngest of three sons and four children. His father was Reverend John Alexander Faris Warren of the Church of Ireland. He spent much of his early life in India with his missionary parents. He travelled to Nigeria as a missionary to the Hausa in 1928, but Ill-health soon forced him to return to the UK. He studied for ordination at Ridley Hall in Cambridge, and then worked as vicar of Holy Trinity, Cambridge from 1936 to 1942.

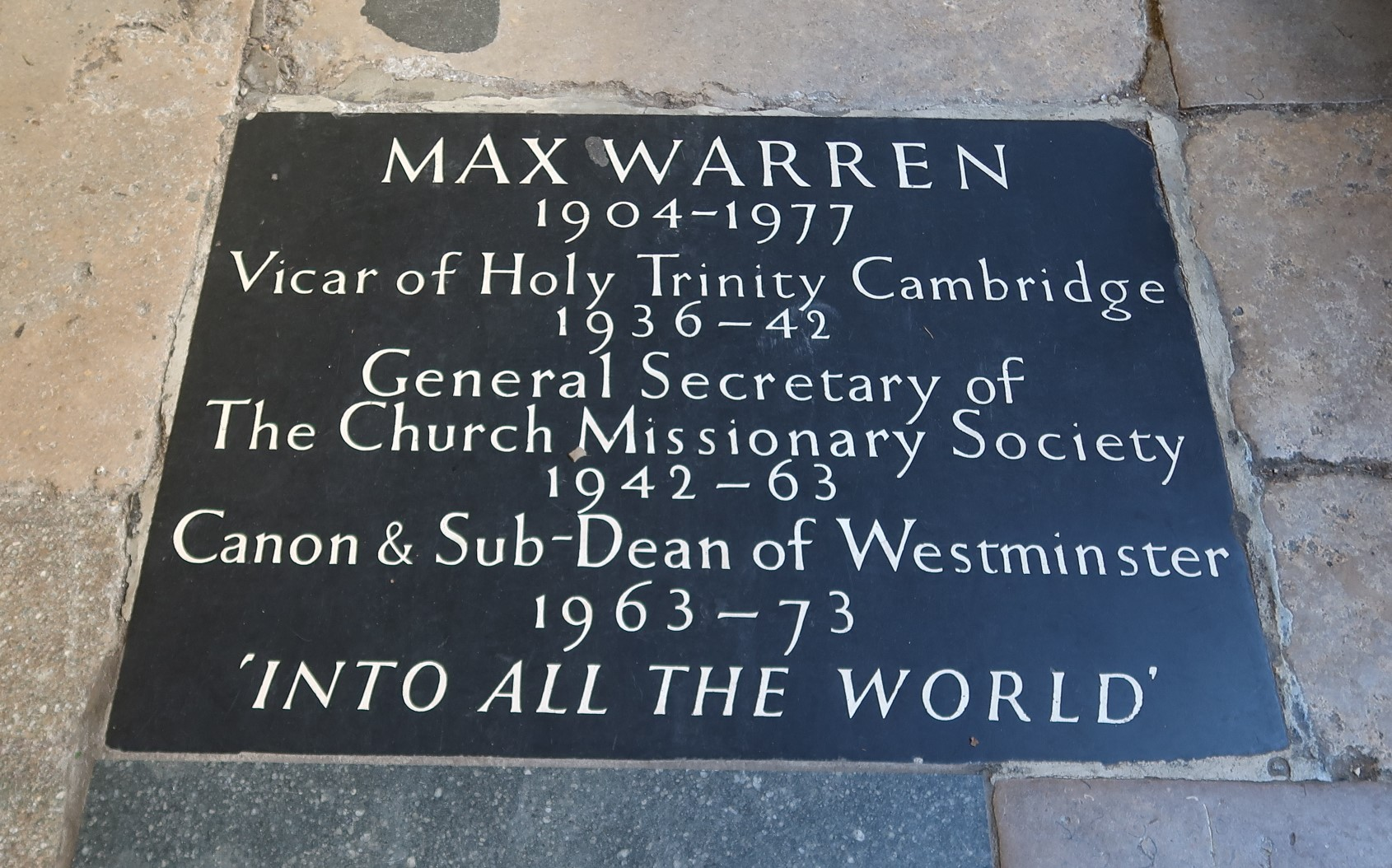
Memorial in floor of cloister in Westminster Abbey

Warren served as general secretary of the CMS for over 20 years, from 1942 to 1963, when he was appointed as canon and subdean of Westminster Abbey, London.
