= Christopher Buxton (property developer) =

British property developer (1929–2017)

Christopher Buxton at Hampton Gay manor house, Oxfordshire.

Christopher Godfrey Reader Buxton OBE (22 May 1929 - 12 August 2017) was a property developer who pioneered the subdivision of English country houses into smaller units that enabled their owners to continue to live in part of their former home. He was also president of the Abbeyfield Society.

== Early life and family ==
Christopher Buxton was born in Surrey on 22 May 1929 to Barclay Godfrey Buxton and Dorothy Buxton (Harris). His father ran a college for missionaries. His ancestors included the prison reformer Elizabeth Fry and the anti-slavery campaigner Sir Thomas Fowell Buxton MP. He was educated in the Junior School department of Monkton Combe School in Combe Down before going on to Charterhouse School and to Trinity College, University of Cambridge, where he played hockey, took a degree in history and was friends with future British foreign secretary Douglas Hurd.

He married Margaret Watkins in 1964, but they later divorced and Buxton did not re-marry. He had relationships with a number of women in the rest of his life.

== Career ==
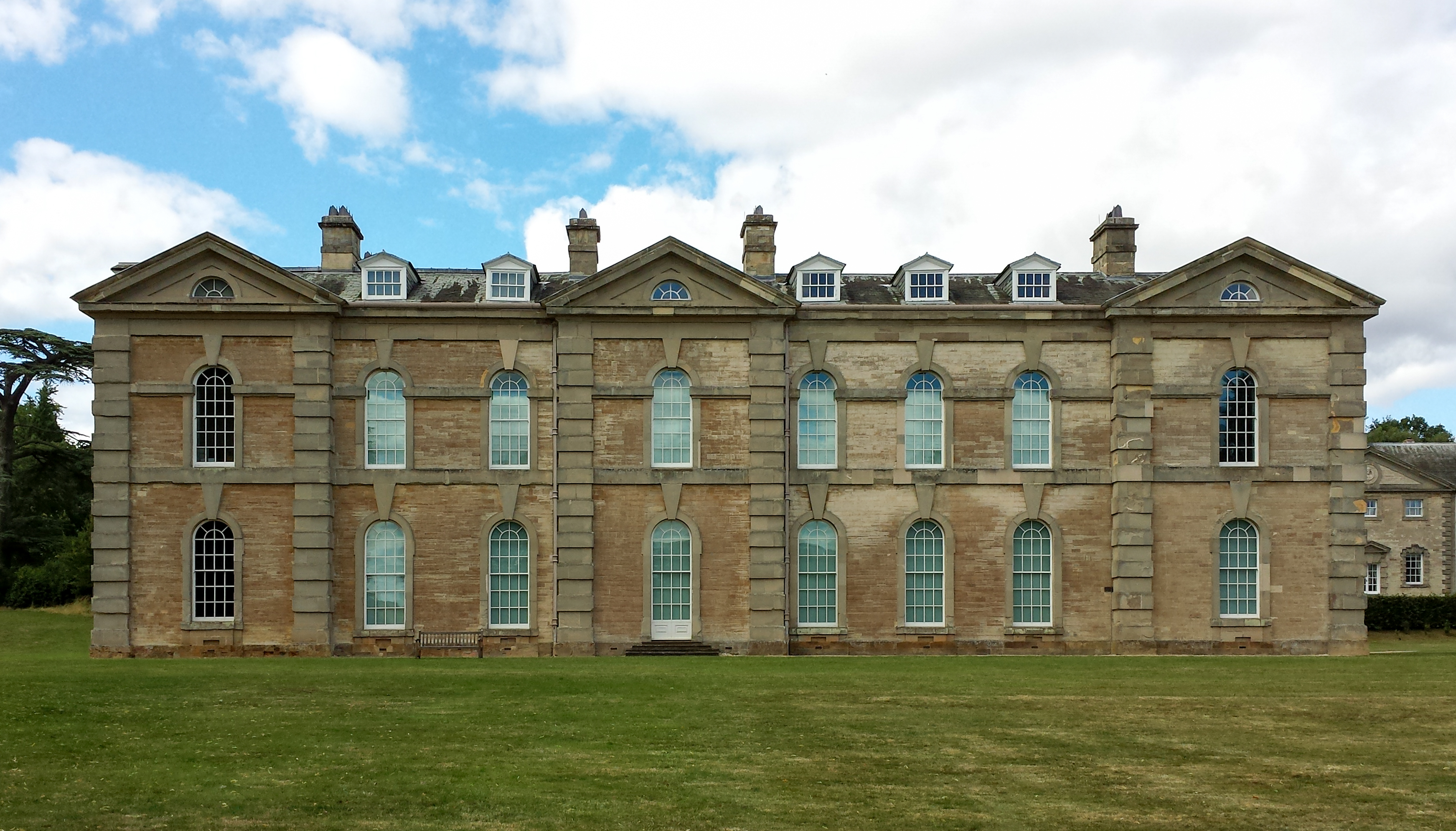
Compton Verney House, south-east facade.

Buxton made a career from the 1950s of buying, restoring, and sub-dividing English country houses into smaller units that allowed their, often aristocratic, former owners to continue to live in houses that had become too expensive to maintain as single family homes. Through his company Period and Country Houses, he owned Kirtlington Park in Oxfordshire, part of which he made his own home until his death. He was responsible for the conversion of parts of Charlton Park into flats that ensured its preservation. He bought Compton Verney House but plans to turn it into an opera venue did not go ahead. In 2010 he was the owner of Hampton Gay manor house, Oxfordshire, but plans for that restoration also did not proceed.

He was also closely associated with the Abbeyfield Society, a housing charity providing sheltered housing and care homes for elderly people, of which he was chairman, treasurer, and president at various times.

== Death ==
Buxton died on 12 August 2017.
