= FitzPatrick Institute of African Ornithology =

South African biological research and conservation institute

Coordinates: 33.9564113°S 18.4611377°E

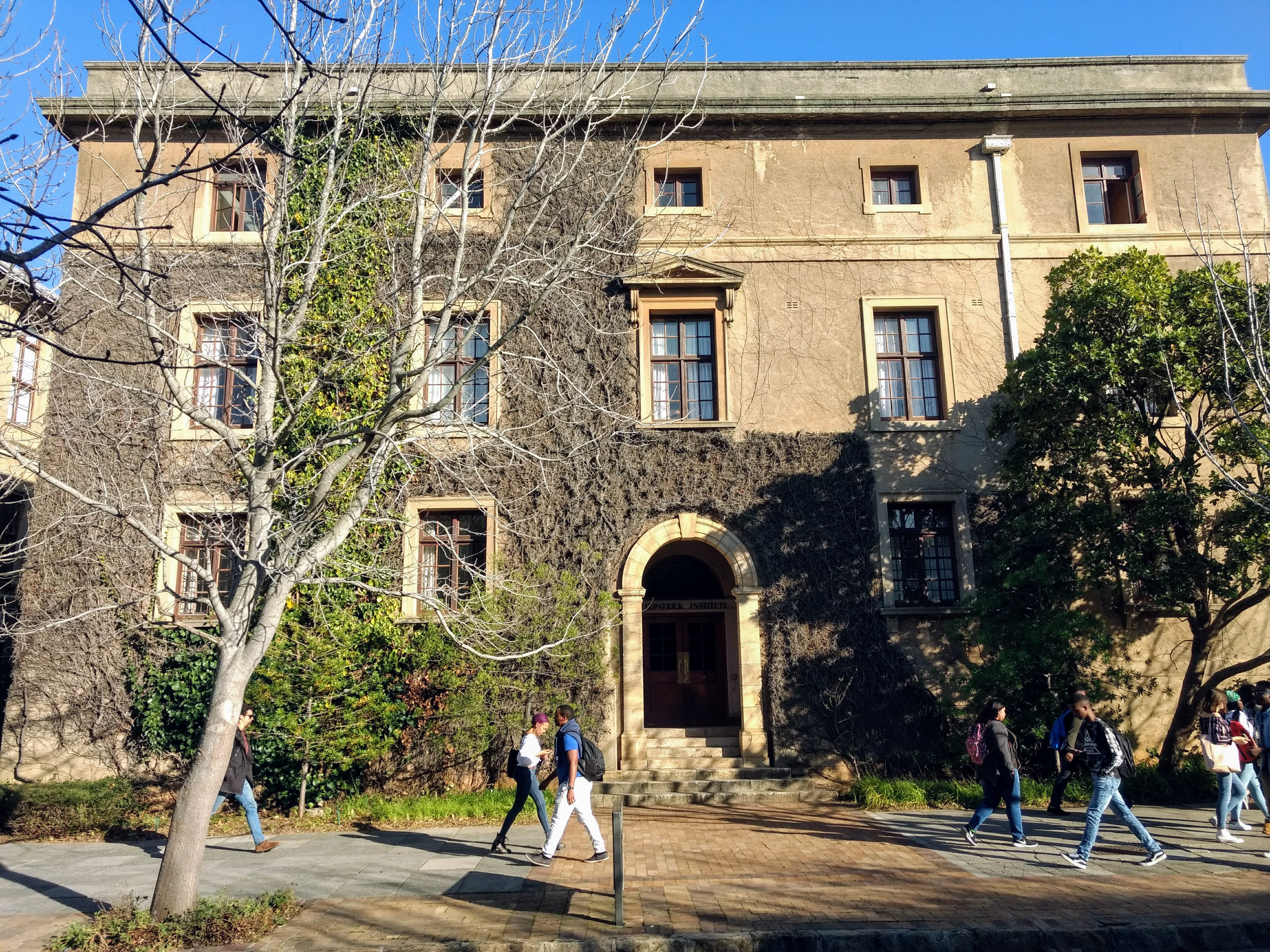
- Established: 1959
- Head of Department: Associate Prof. Susan Cunningham
- Location: Cape Town, South Africa
- Website: science.uct.ac.za/fitzpatrick

The FitzPatrick Institute of African Ornithology is a South African biological research and conservation institute based at the University of Cape Town (UCT). The mission statement of the institute is "to promote and undertake scientific studies involving birds, and contribute to the practice affecting the maintenance of biological diversity and the sustained use of biological resources".

== History ==
The FitzPatrick Institute was founded in 1959 through the efforts and financial support of Cecily Niven, the daughter of Sir Percy FitzPatrick, and was originally incorporated as a non-profit company. It is now incorporated within the University of Cape Town as an autonomous subunit within the department of Biological Sciences. It houses the Niven Library and has become the largest centre for ornithological research in the Southern Hemisphere. The name was changed in 2018 from the "Percy Fitzpatrick Institute of Ornithology".

== Research ==
Research currently undertaken by members of the Fitztitute can be broadly placed within three themes.

- Understanding Biodiversity: Evolutionary and Behavioural Ecology
- Maintaining Biodiversity: Species-level Conservation
- Maintaining Biodiversity: Global Change

=== Conservation Biology Masters Programme ===
Applications for the programme close on 31 August each year. Read more about it on the Details for Applicants page

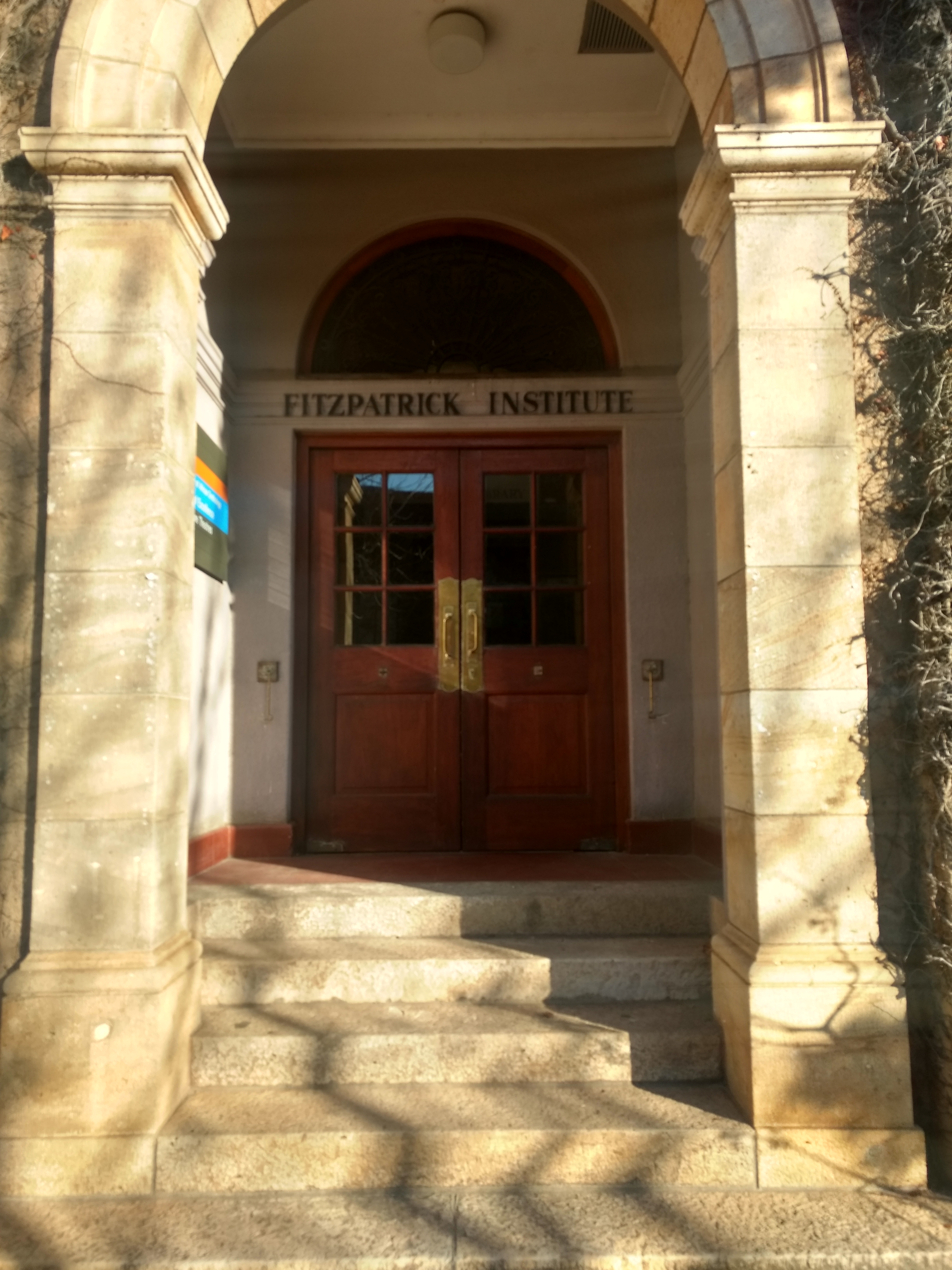
Entrance
