= CJ Skead =

South African naturalist, ornithologist, historian, and botanist

- Born: Cuthbert John Skead; 30 April 1912; Port Elizabeth, South Africa
- Died: 28 May 2006 (aged 94); Port Elizabeth, South Africa
- Education: Reading University
- Known for: Ecology of birds in the Eastern Cape Province
- Scientific career
- Fields: Ornithology; Botany
- Workplaces: Amathole Museum; Percy FitzPatrick Institute of African Ornithology

Cuthbert John Skead, also known as "C. J. Skead", "Jack Skead" or "Skeado" (30 April 1912 – 28 May 2006), was a South African naturalist, ornithologist, historian and botanist.

== Early life ==
Born in Port Elizabeth, 30 April 1912, Skead initially attended Grey High School in Port Elizabeth, before completing his schooling at St Andrew's College in Grahamstown. His tertiary education was undertaken at Reading University in the United Kingdom, and Grootfontein Agricultural College back in South Africa.

For the next 17 years after completing his tertiary education, Skead farmed in the Grahamstown district. It was during his farming career that he started observing birds in the vicinity which led to his first publication appearing in the journal Ostrich (journal) in 1943. In 1949, Skead took up the position of Director at the Kaffrarian Museum (now the Amathole Museum). He also served as a research officer for the Percy FitzPatrick Institute, a research institute associated with the University of Cape Town from 1961 to 1966, after which he returned to the museum where he remained until his retirement in 1972.

== Retirement ==
Skead retired to Grahamstown in 1972 where he continued his natural history research, before moving to a retirement village in Port Elizabeth until his death on 28 May 2006. During his 33 year period of retirement, Skead accelerated the scope of his studies focusing on synthesizing historical records of diverse topics, including the distribution of mammals, birds, plants, stone walls, and early travelers and explorers of the Eastern Cape. Skead focused on all aspects of the history of the Eastern Cape and as a result he studied place names.

== Legacy ==
Skead contributed to the scholarly knowledge through producing more than 100 journal articles and books, including Sunbirds of South Africa, Canaries, seedeaters and buntings, and Historical Incidence of the Larger Mammals.

== Honours ==
- 1966 Gill Memorial Medal from the Southern African Ornithological Society
- 1977 Gold Medal from the Zoological Society of Southern Africa
- 1982 Honorary Doctorate from Rhodes University
- 2002 Gold Medal from the Grassland Society
- 2004 Honorary Doctorate from the University of Port Elizabeth
- 2005 Special Award from the Eastern Cape Government

== Chronological bibliography of major published works[edit] ==
YEAR	TITLE	PUBLISHER
1980	Historical Mammal Incidence in the Cape Province Volume 1: The Western and Northern Cape.	Department of Nature & Environmental Conservation, Cape of Good Hope
1987	Historical Mammal Incidence in the Cape Province Volume 2: The Eastern Half of the Cape Province including the Ciskei, Transkei and East Griqualand.	Department of Nature & Environmental Conservation, Cape of Good Hope
1993	The Algoa Gazetteer	Algoa Regional Services Council, Port Elizabeth
2000	Observations on Khoekhoe Placenames	Bluecliff
