= Bird atlas =

Ornithological data in map form

A bird atlas is an ornithological work that attempts to provide information on the distribution, abundance, long-term change as well as seasonal patterns of bird occurrence and makes extensive use of maps. They typically rely on many volunteers for broad geographic coverage, and standardized methods ensure future studies yield comparable results. In some cases the species covered may be restricted to those that breed or are resident. Migration atlases on the other hand cover migratory birds, depict maps showing summaries of ringing, and recoveries.

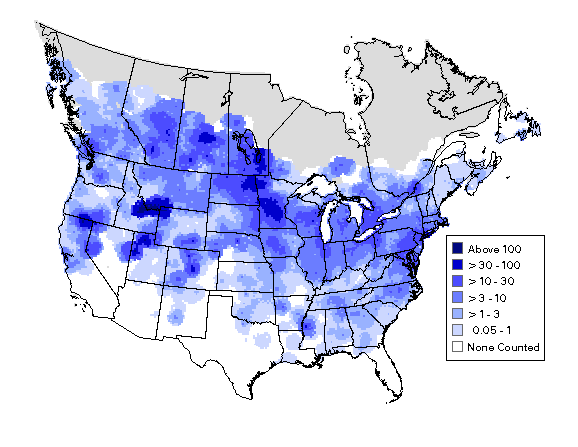
Summer distribution and abundance of Canada goose using data from the North American Breeding Bird Surveys 1994-2003

Bird atlases vary in methodology, but they always involve spatial (locations) and temporal (time) components. A typical bird atlas project collates data on bird presence or abundance with mapping of this information over a significant geographical region over a well-defined period of time. Data gathered in other efforts, such as breeding bird surveys and eBird, may also contribute to atlas projects.

== History ==
The earliest published mapping of biodiversity in the form of an atlas was completed for the flora of Britain - Atlas of the British Flora (1962) The first bird atlas, the Atlas of breeding birds of the West Midlands, covered Staffordshire, Warwickshire and Worcestershire (England) and was published by Collins for the West Midland Bird Club, in 1970., It built on work done by the Club and its subsequent president, Tony Norris, for its West Midland Bird Distribution Survey, circulated privately in 1951, which mapped frequency of sightings and breeding densities against districts based on the boundaries of Rural District Councils. The British Trust for Ornithology published updated atlases, covering Britain and Ireland, in 1993 and 2013. The West Midlands atlas influenced and was followed by the 1976 Atlas of Breeding Birds in Britain and Ireland. In the US, the first breeding bird atlas to be published was for the State of Vermont. In the decades that followed a number of atlases have been made all over the world and by 2008 atlases had summarised as many as 27.9 million records of birds gathered by at least 108000 contributors, over an area covering roughly 31.4% of the world's land. While early atlases focused on merely the presence or absence of species and evidence of their breeding, there is an increasing trend towards those that indicate abundance or relative abundance.

== Methods ==
In the oldest and most popular sampling approach, the region to be covered is gridded and volunteers are expected to visit representative locations within each grid cell and gather data that is subsequently collated. The method of collecting data, time and season in which to obtain the sample information are pre-decided as part of a protocol. In some cases the numbers and species of birds that are found to be breeding are recorded, others may use timed point sampling or transects within the grid cells to obtain quantitative estimates of abundance. In some countries the grid cells follow the latitudes and longitudes - cell intervals of 1 degree, 30 and 15 minutes are often chosen for convenience. In higher latitudes where such an approach leads to grid cells with large differences in area, sizes are more often fixed using grid distances of 1, 2, 5, 10 or even 50 km grid intervals. The Oregon Breeding Bird Atlas addressed this by using hexagonal survey units, which cover a spherical surface such as the earth without changing size. The hexagons, each with an area of 435 square kilometers, also contained a survey unit of 25 square kilometers. A disadvantage with grids of any type is that boundaries rarely match those of habitats, making them unsuitable for some types of ecological studies. Another problem is that the data collected in one project cannot be readily reused with new grid alignments that may be needed for instance when combining information with other projects. Repeat atlases made after a decade or two have helped in identifying long term range changes. Recommendations and guidance stemming from the cumulative experience of state and provincial atlas projects is provided in handbooks of the North American Ornithological Atlas Committee (NORAC), published in English, French, and Spanish.

Another approach that does not need pre-defined grids makes use of the coordinates of individual points. Coordinates may be determined from maps or using GPS devices, and the point densities can be interpolated to generate grid or contour maps. The Summer Atlas of North American Birds (1995) is one such example that makes use of such point data (not using grids) collected by the North American Breeding Bird Surveys. Others such as the EPOQ atlas for Quebec in Canada use 'trip lists', lists of birds seen at a place on a trip. A problem in atlas projects is the unequal distribution of available observers resulting in some grid cells having too few visits. Sometimes it is possible to make corrections for the differences in the sampling effort. Reporting rates are often used as a simple quantitative indicator. A framework has also been developed to incorporate monitoring data, hierarchical modelling and sampling simulations to augment occurrence and breeding status maps with species abundances.

== Applications ==
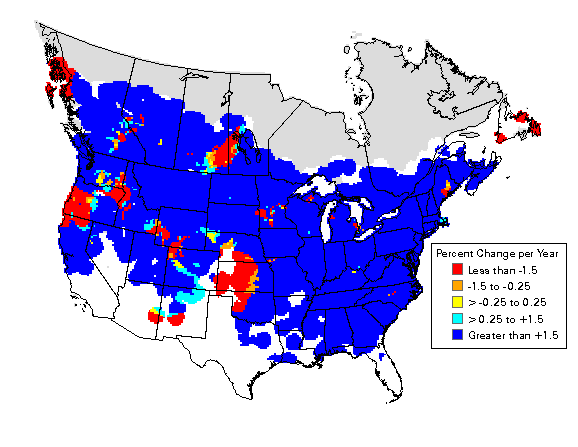
Changes in abundance of Canada goose between 1966 and 2003 identified using data from the North American Breeding Bird Surveys

Some authors note the distinction between the published "atlas" (usually a book but sometimes are web based systems or CD-ROM as was the case for Oregon) and the actual atlas data. The data itself cannot be recovered back from published atlases for alternate applications unless made separately available as an electronic database. Depending on the methodology used, there can be multiple applications for atlas data.

Atlases at a minimum, have an educational and recreational value. They provide information on the current distributions of birds and may be used by birdwatchers to assess the importance of their own observation records, learn more about species, or to plan trips. Distribution maps in atlases are usually far more accurate and detailed than those in field guides.

Atlases document distributions and populations for conservation and research. Species distribution ranges are important in assessing conservation criteria. Patterns of sympatry and allopatry are better observed when measures of relative abundance are also collected. When atlas projects are repeated over time it is possible to note changes in distribution. Reasons for change may be sought to identify causes when these changes are significant. Ecological niche models may be built to identify factors that are significant in influencing the occurrence of species. Many studies have examined the distributions of rare species and have noted that they often do not occur in species-rich areas. Studies using atlas data have helped in identifying key sites for conservation. Atlas data has also been used to identify biogeographic zones.

Atlases have helped in resolving taxonomic problems. DNA studies had shown that the two 'subspecies' of Eupodotis afra were distinct. The southern African atlas was able to demonstrate that these two 'subspecies' were disjunct in distribution except for a small area of overlap. The earlier distribution maps (made using what has been termed the 'shade-the-triangle' method) were totally misleading.

Atlas projects can involve several countries. The Southern African Bird Atlas Project (SABAP) was started in 1986 with data gathered from six countries: Botswana, Lesotho, Namibia, South Africa, Swaziland and Zimbabwe. This resulted in a published book form atlas in 1997 and the database held seven million distribution records. It has been used by planners, conservationists, researchers and for ecotourism apart from being used in over fifty research papers and eight academic dissertations.

Bird atlases can also serve as a guide for more detailed research. Atlas data can be used to develop sampling and survey designs for intensive studies.

== See also ==
- The EBCC Atlas of European Breeding Birds. Published for the European Bird Census Council by T & A D Poyser in 1997.
- A Climatic Atlas of European Breeding Birds. Published as a partnership between Durham University, the RSPB and Lynx Edicions in association with the University of Cambridge, BirdLife International and EBCC.2007.
- Southern African Bird Atlas Project 1987–1991 (SABAP, since 2007 referred to as SABAP1) – pdfs of most species texts in 1997-published two-volume atlas are provided as External links within relevant Wikipedia species accounts.
- Second Southern African Bird Atlas Project started in 2007 and ongoing SABAP2
- Bird Atlas 2007-11 for distribution maps from previous Britain and Ireland atlases, and preliminary results from the current Bird Atlas 2007-11 project.
