= Skead =

Skead may also refer to:

== People ==
- CJ Skead (1912–2006), South African naturalist, ornithologist, historian and botanist
- James Skead (1817–1884), Canadian businessman and politician

== Other uses ==
- Skead, Ontario
