= Birda (app) =

Birdwatching mobile application

- Type: Private
- Industry: Mobile app; Citizen science
- Founded: April 26, 2017; 9 years ago
- Founders: John White; Natalie White
- Headquarters: London, United Kingdom
- Key people: John White (CEO); Natalie White (COO); Lee Clissett (CPO)
- Products: Birda app (iOS and Android)
- Website: birda.org

Birda is a birdwatching and citizen science mobile application designed to help users identify and record bird species while contributing data to conservation research. The app combines social networking and gamification elements, allowing users to share observations, participate in challenges, and compare life lists with others. Birda also publishes observation data to the Global Biodiversity Information Facility (GBIF).

== Overview ==
Birda operates on a freemium subscription model. The app provides a digital species guide, automatically updated life lists, tools for logging bird sightings, and options for community-based species identification. It is available internationally with regional species lists and multilingual common names. Users may choose to share their sightings with conservation researchers as part of citizen science monitoring projects.

== History ==
Birda developed from an earlier wildlife platform created by its founders. In 2012, John and Natalie White launched Tracking the Wild, a wildlife sightings platform in Southern Africa. It officially launched in 2014 with a website and mobile apps. In 2017, they shifted focus to birdwatching and released Chirp Birding. After a rebrand and funding round in 2020, the platform relaunched as Birda in 2022.

Birda launched in the United Kingdom in January 2022, in the United States in September 2022, and subsequently became available worldwide. Apple featured Birda as its "App of the Day" in around 150 countries, including the United States.

== Data use ==
Birda publishes bird observation records to the Global Biodiversity Information Facility, contributing a global dataset of community sightings. The platform also maintains a species guide that covers all known bird species, which has been cited in peer-reviewed research.

== See also ==
- eBird
- Tracking the Wild
- Global Biodiversity Information Facility
