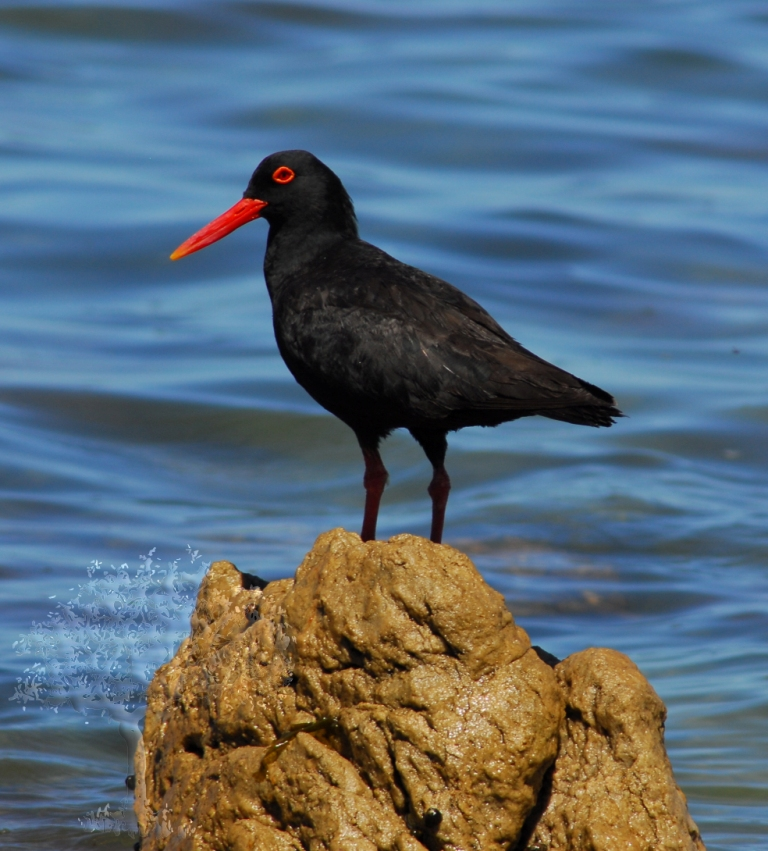
- African oystercatcher in Betty's Bay

Conservation status
- Least Concern (IUCN 3.1)

Scientific classification
- Kingdom: Animalia
- Phylum: Chordata
- Class: Aves
- Order: Charadriiformes
- Family: Haematopodidae
- Genus: Haematopus
- Species: H. moquini

Binomial name
- Haematopus moquini Bonaparte, 1856
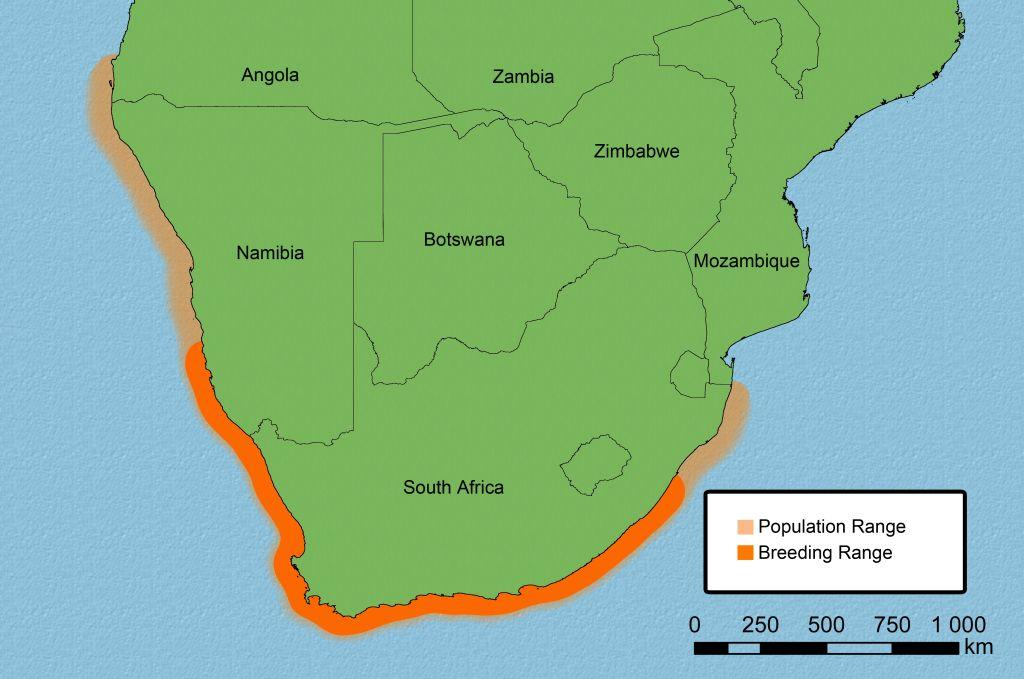
- breeding range population range

Synonyms
- Metanibyx africana ? Haematopus niger Moquin, 1820; Ostralega capensis Lichtenstein, 1823; Haematopus capensis Gray, 1847; Melanibyx moquini Reichenbach, 1851; Haematopus unicolor Lichtenstein, 1854; Melanibyx capensis Heine, 1890; Haematopus ostralegus moquini Peters, 1934

= African oystercatcher =

Species of bird native to southern Africa

The African oystercatcher or African black oystercatcher (Haematopus moquini) is a large charismatic wader resident to the mainland coasts and offshore islands of southern Africa. This oystercatcher has a population of over 6,000 adults, which breed between November and April. The scientific name moquini commemorates the French naturalist Alfred Moquin-Tandon who discovered and named this species before Bonaparte.

== Description ==
The African oystercatcher is a large, noisy wader, with completely black plumage, red legs and a strong broad red bill. The sexes are similar in appearance, however, females are larger and have a slightly longer beak than males. Juveniles have soft grey plumage and do not express the characteristic red legs and beak until after they fledge. The call is a distinctive loud piping, very similar to Eurasian oystercatchers. As the Eurasian oystercatcher is a migratory species they only occur as a vagrant in southern Africa, and its black-and-white plumage makes confusion impossible.

=== Average measurements ===
Body Length: 42–45 cm (17–18 in)
Wingspan: 80 and 88 cm (31 and 35 in)
Mass: ♂ 665 g (1.466 lb) ♀ 730 g (1.61 lb)
Tarsus: 50.6 to 60.8 mm (1.99 to 2.39 in)
Culmen: 57.7 to 79.1 cm (22.7 to 31.1 in)

== Distribution and habitat ==
The African oystercatcher is native to the mainland coasts and offshore islands of Southern Africa. Its breeding range extends from Lüderitz, Namibia to Mazeppa Bay, Eastern Cape, South Africa, with dispersal in winter north to southern Angola and southern Mozambique. There are estimated to be over 6,000 adult birds in total. There is one record of a vagrant from Gambia, a specimen from 1938 in the British Museum which proved to be H. moquini on genetic analysis after previously being considered unidentified or possibly a Canary Islands oystercatcher H. meadewaldoi.

Typically sedentary African oystercatchers rarely leave their territories, which include a nesting site and feeding grounds. These will usually be located on or near rocky shores where they can feed.

== Ecology ==
=== Feeding ===
African oystercatchers predominantly feed on molluscs such as mussels and limpets, although they are known to also feed on polychaetes, insects and potentially even fish. They are adapted to pry open mussels and loosen limpets off the rocks but have been recorded picking through sand to locate other food items.

=== Breeding ===
The nest is a bare scrape on pebbles, sand or shingle within about 30 metres (98 ft) of the high-water mark. On rock ledges there may be a rim of shells to keep the eggs in place. The female generally lays two eggs, but there may be one or three, which are incubated by both adults. The incubation period varies between 27 and 39 days and the young take a further 38 or so days to fledge. Breeding success is greater on offshore islands where there are few predators and less disturbance than mainland sites.

The eggs average about 65 mm (2.6 in) in length, ranging from 45 to 73 mm (1.8 to 2.9 in), and have a breadth of 41 mm (1.6 in), ranging from 34 to 45 cm (13 to 18 in).

=== Longevity and mortality ===
The lifespan of an African oystercatcher is about 35 years, of which they are known to pair up for 25 years. Although adults are rarely predated, most mainland egg and chick fatalities are due to disturbance by people, off-road vehicles, dog attacks and predation by the kelp gull (Larus dominicanus) and other avian predators. Offshore pairs experience similar avian predation although most chicks perish due to starvation.

== Status ==
As of December 2017 the global IUCN assessment of the African oystercatcher's status is "Least Concern". The population trend seems to be upward as the local community becomes more involved in adopting conservation measures. In South Africa, the species has also been downlisted to Least Concern. A long-term program by the South African Ringing Scheme is tracking the dispersal of ringed birds to keep conservation assessments in South Africa and Namibia up to date.

== Gallery ==
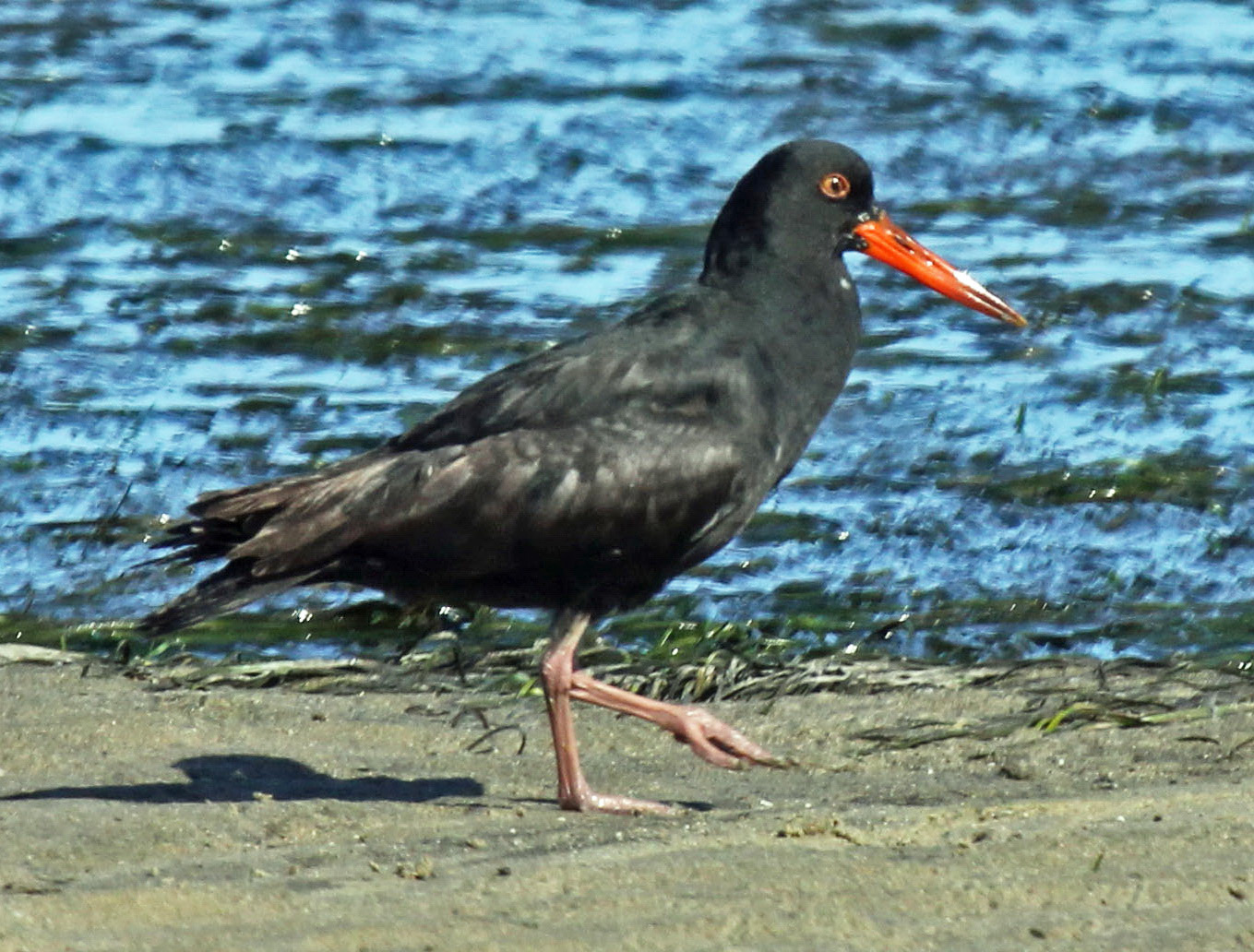
Plettenberg Bay, South Africa

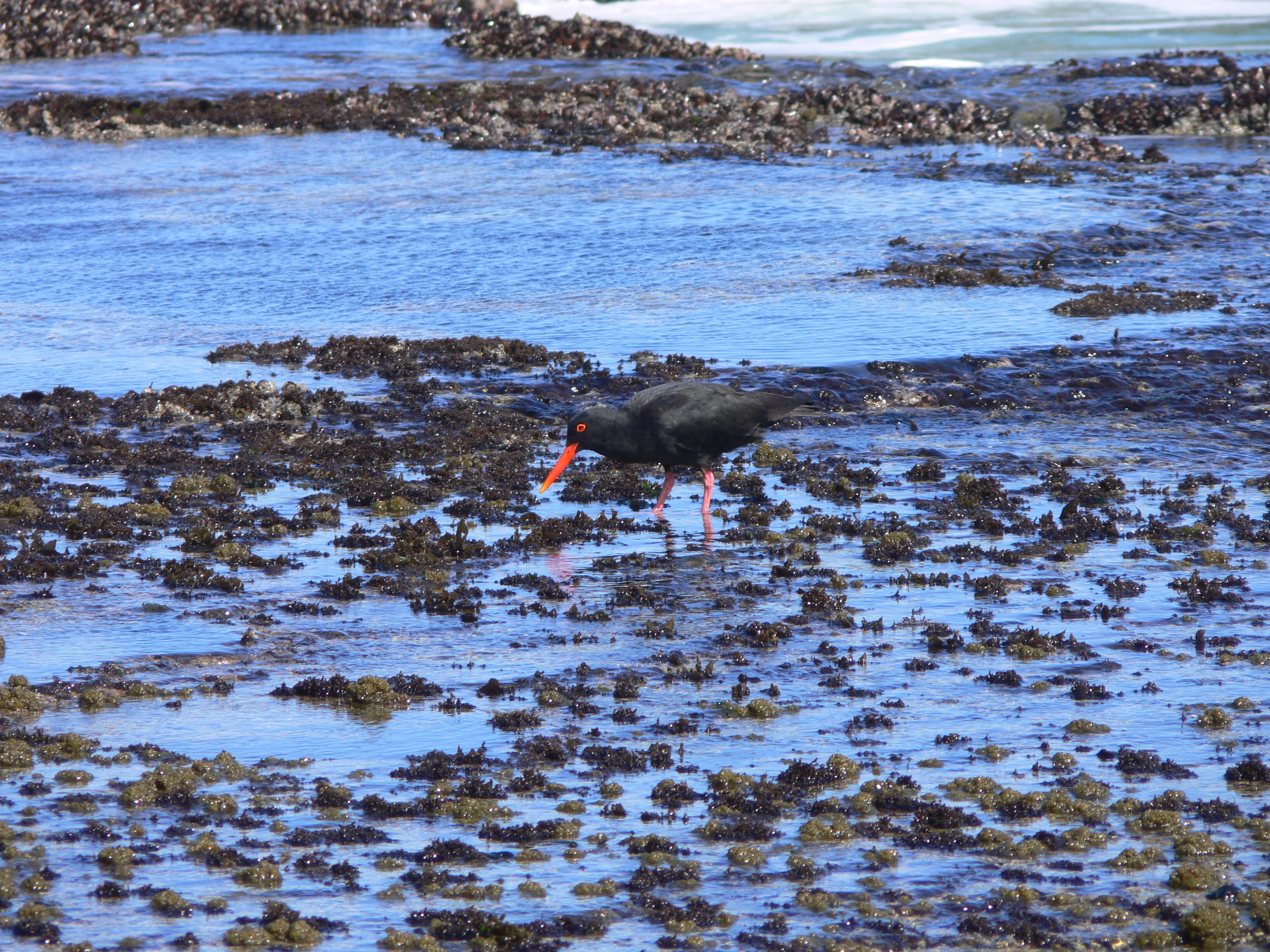
Feeding on the rocky shore

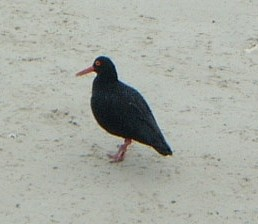
Taken in South Africa

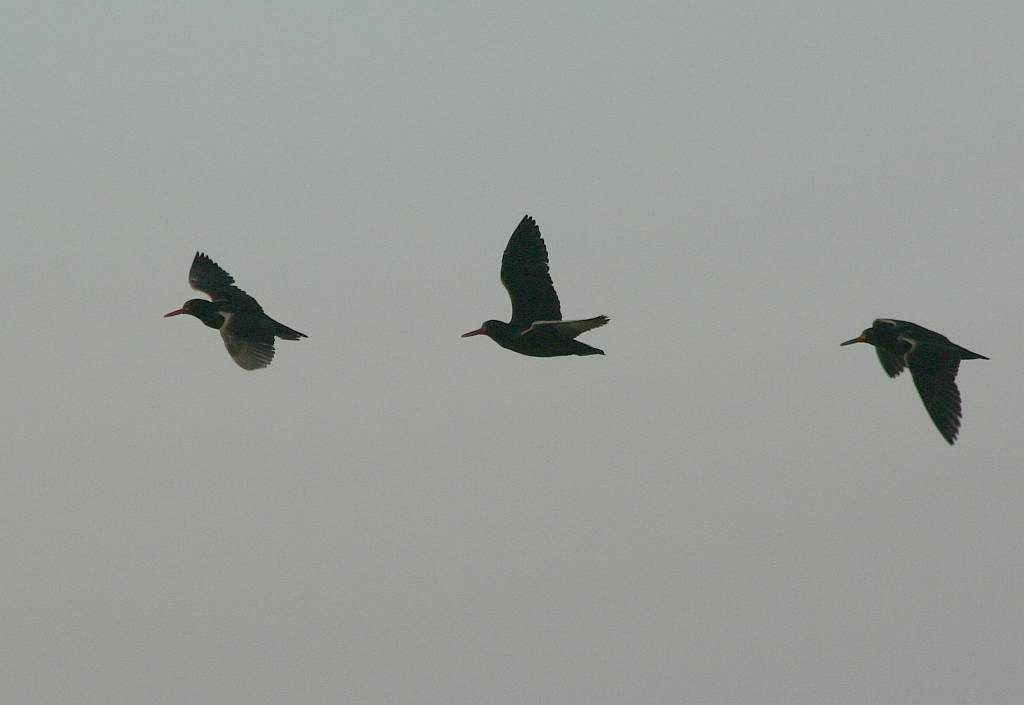
Three in flight

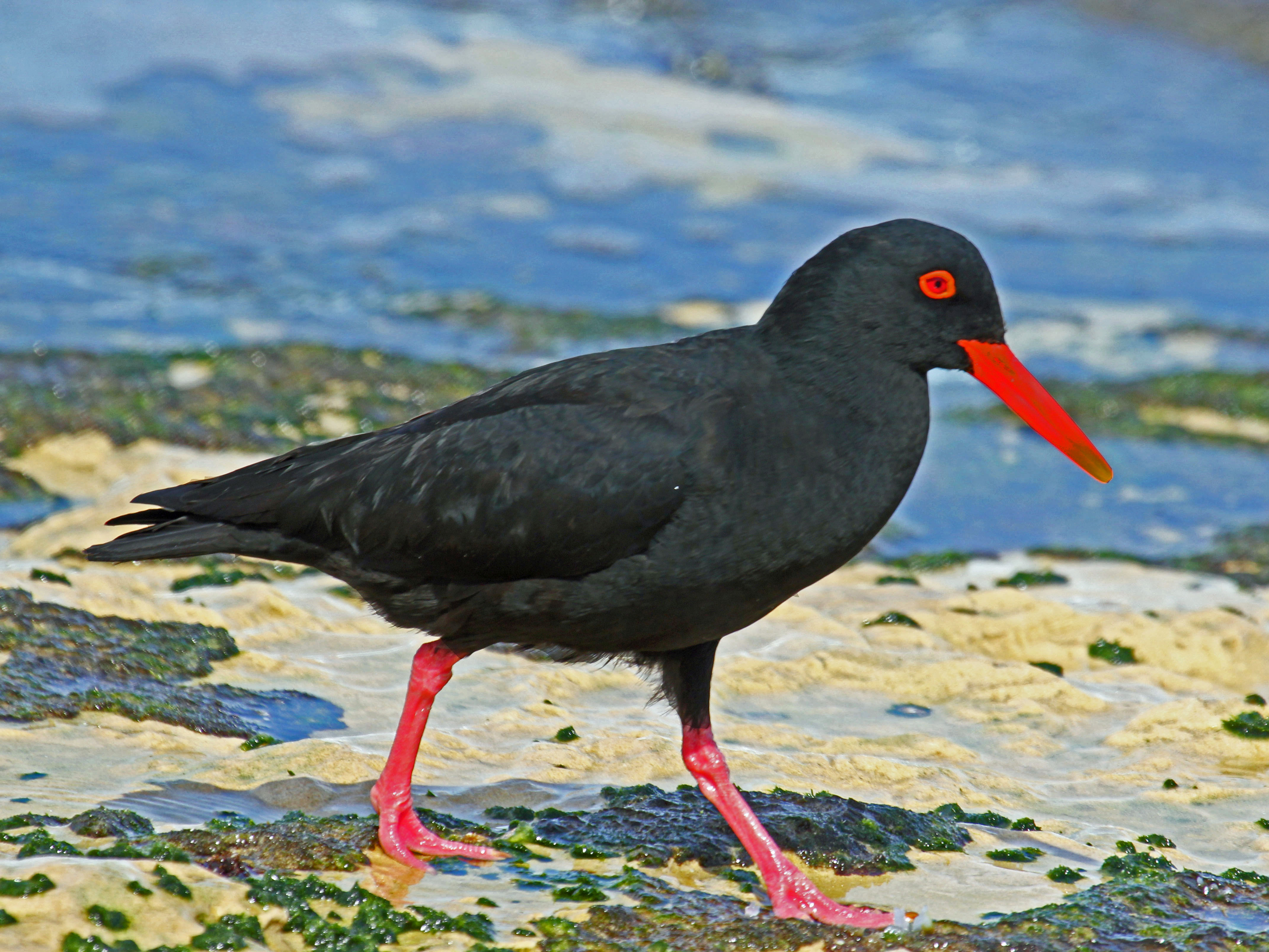
at De Hoop, South Africa

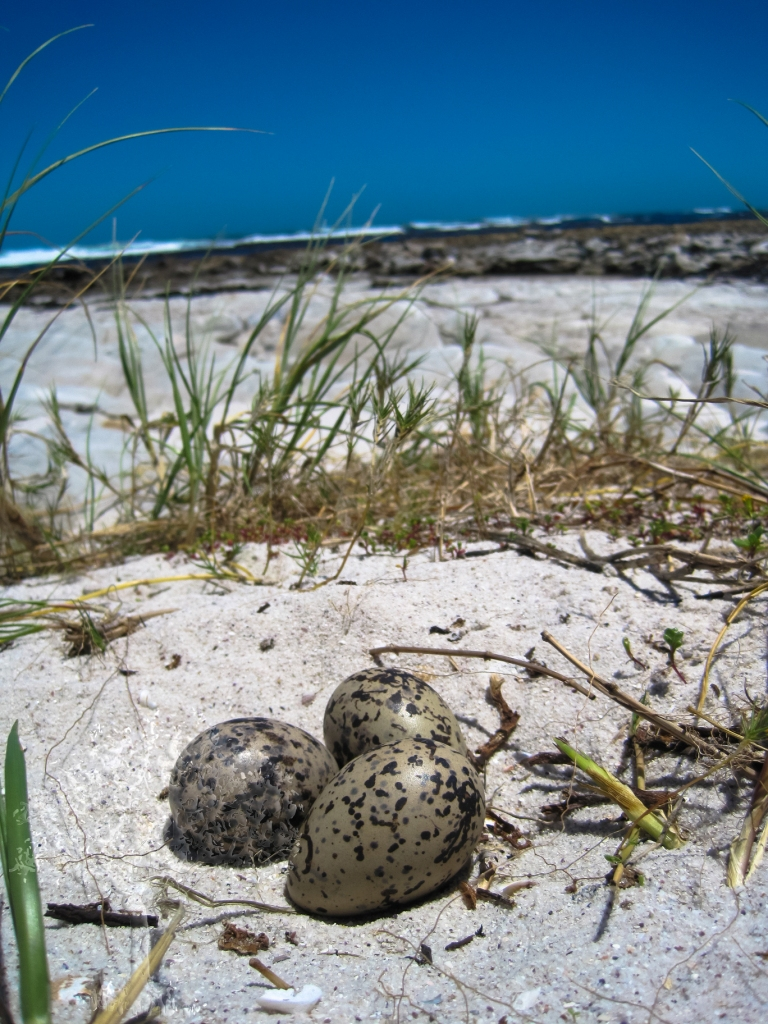
Three egg clutch

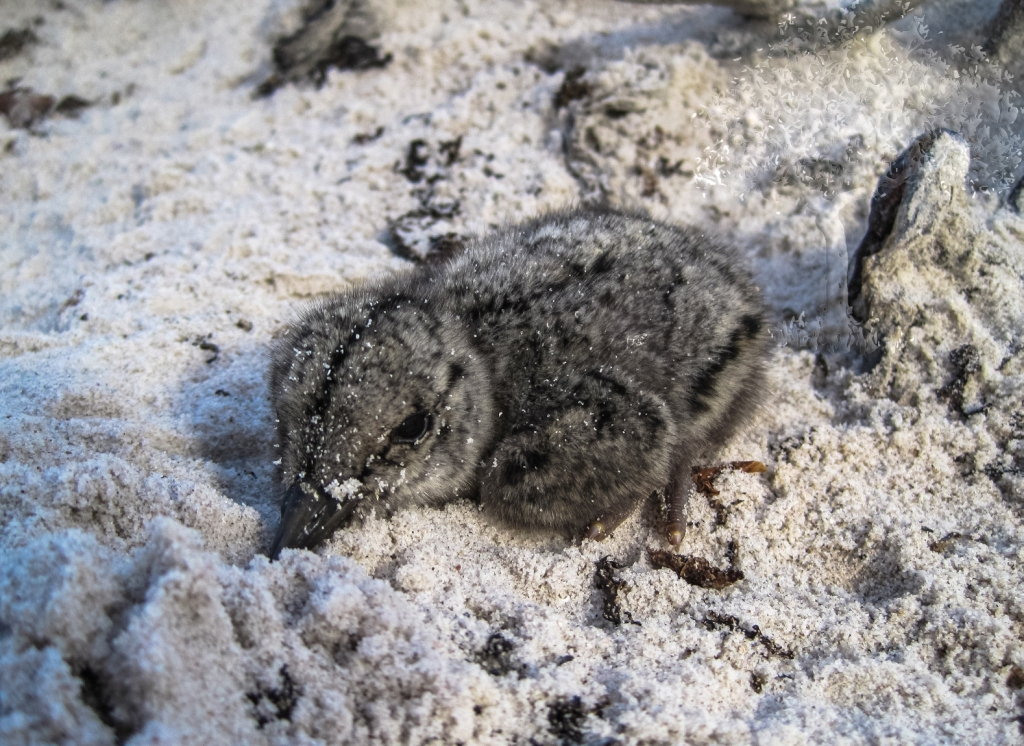
African oystercatcher chick

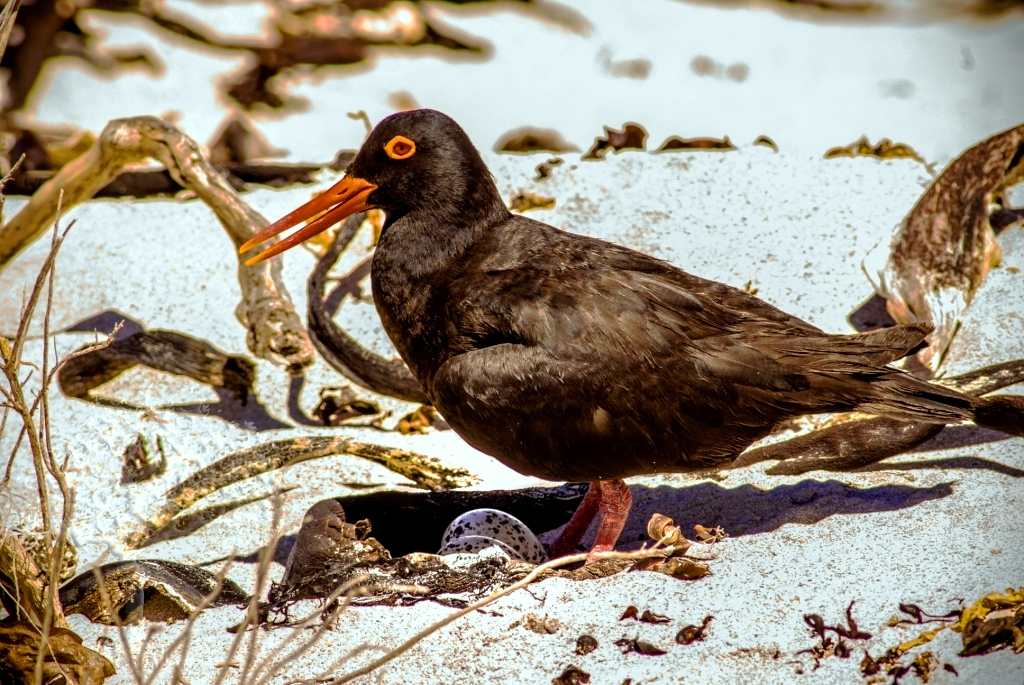
African oystercatcher shading eggs

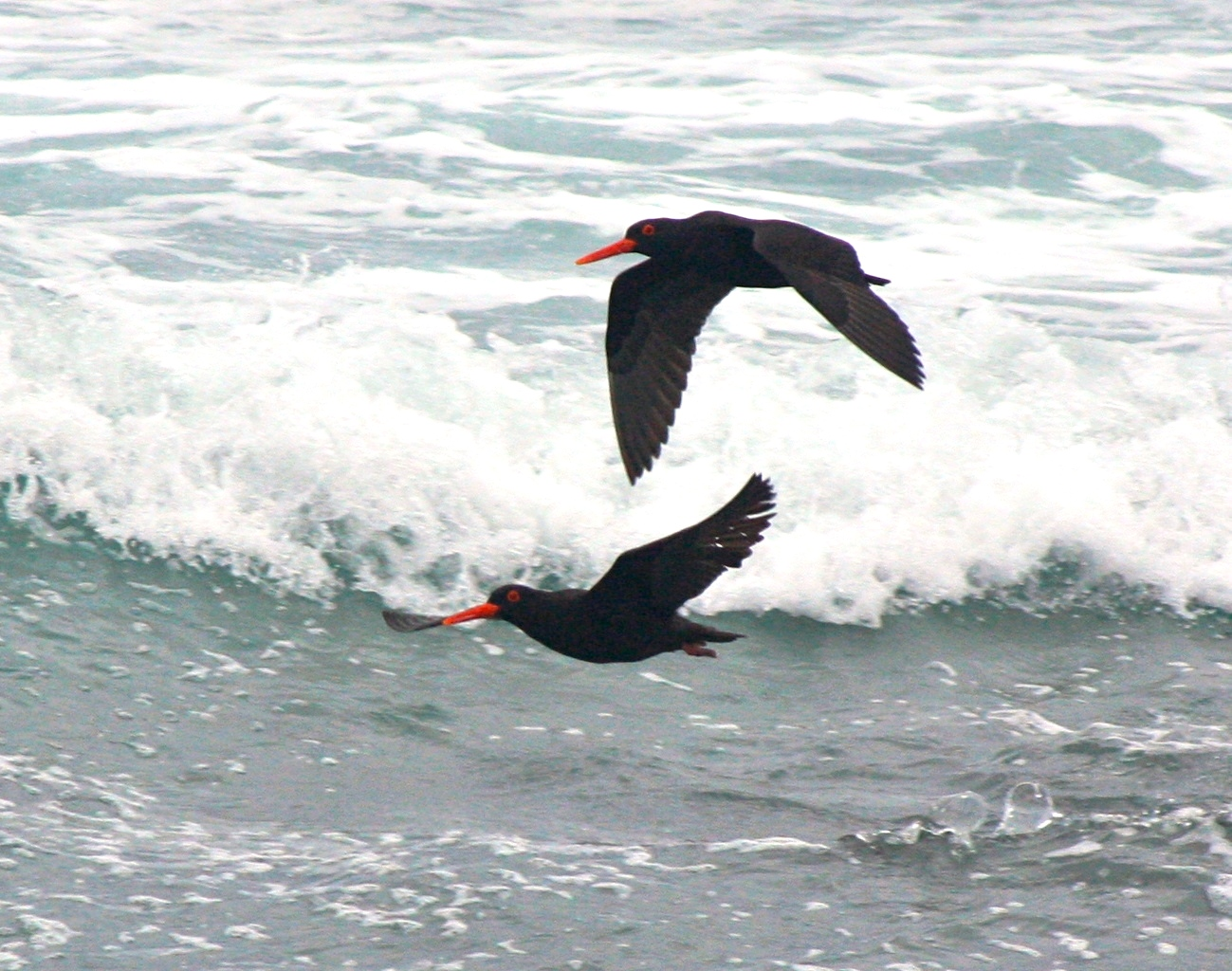
A pair in flight

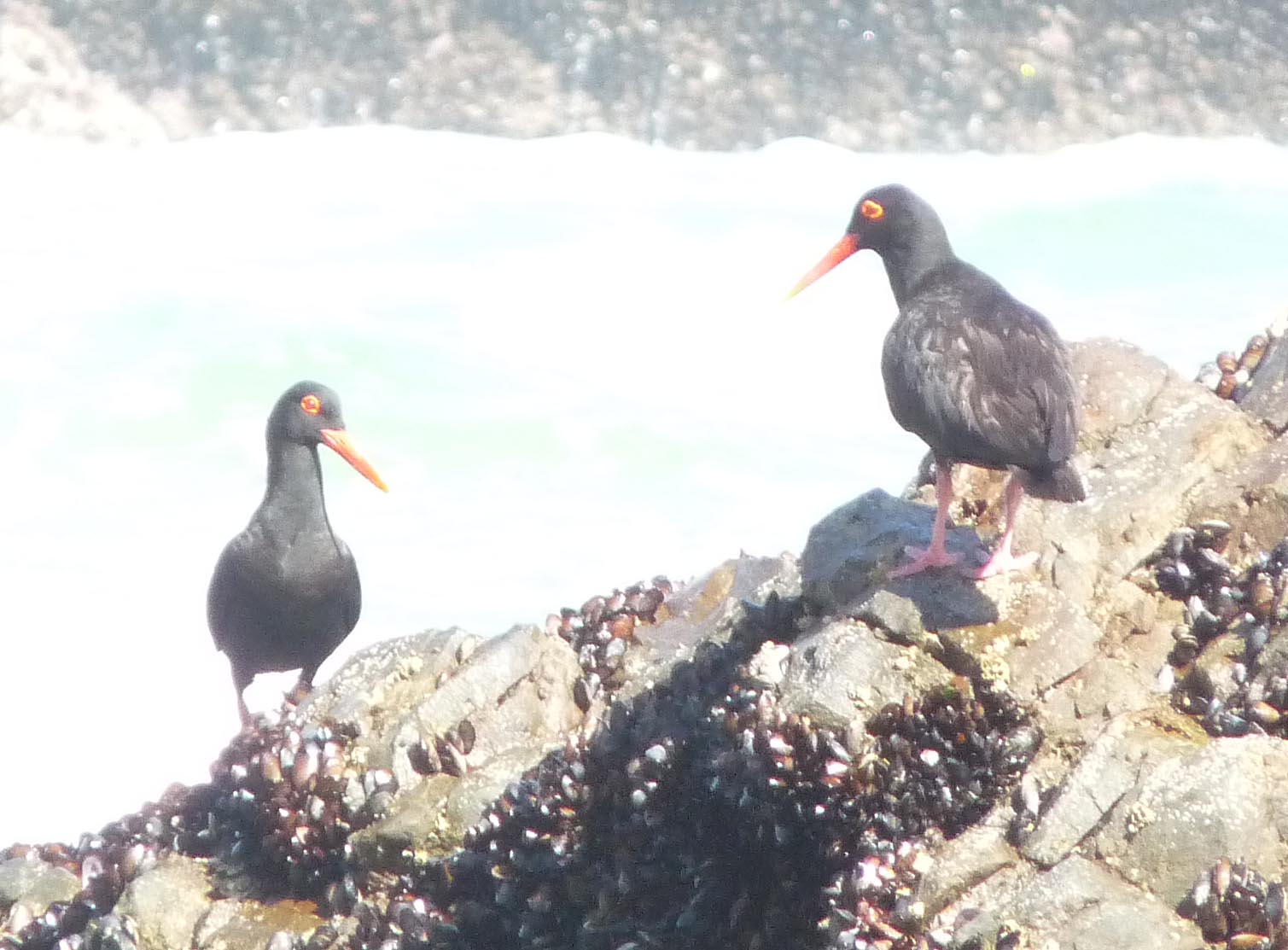
African oystercatcher 01

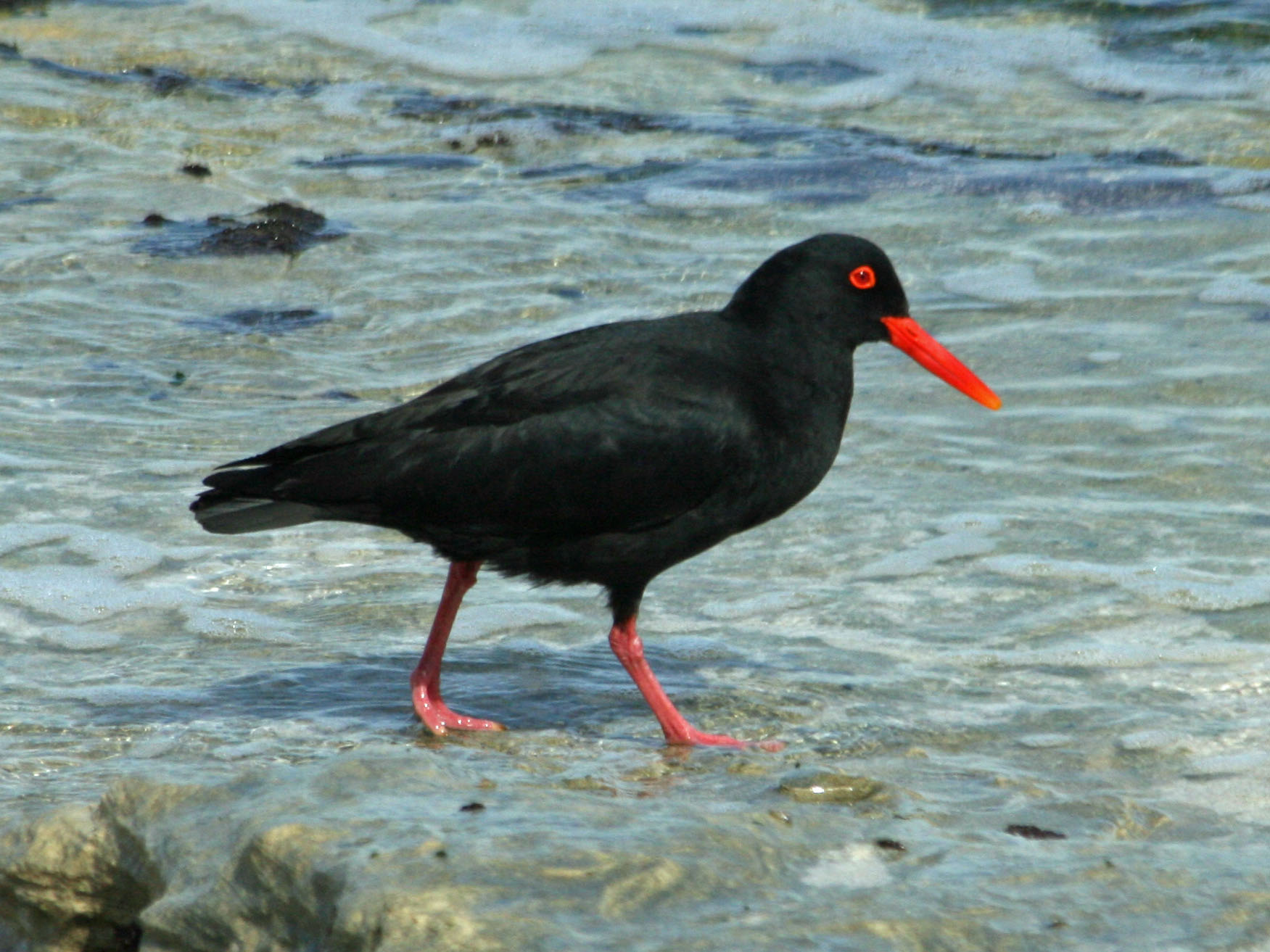
African oystercatcher

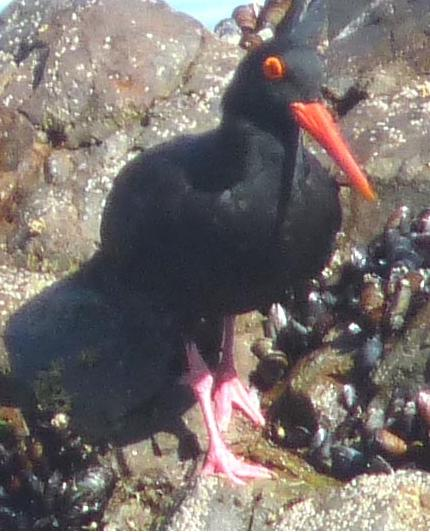
Haematopus moquini

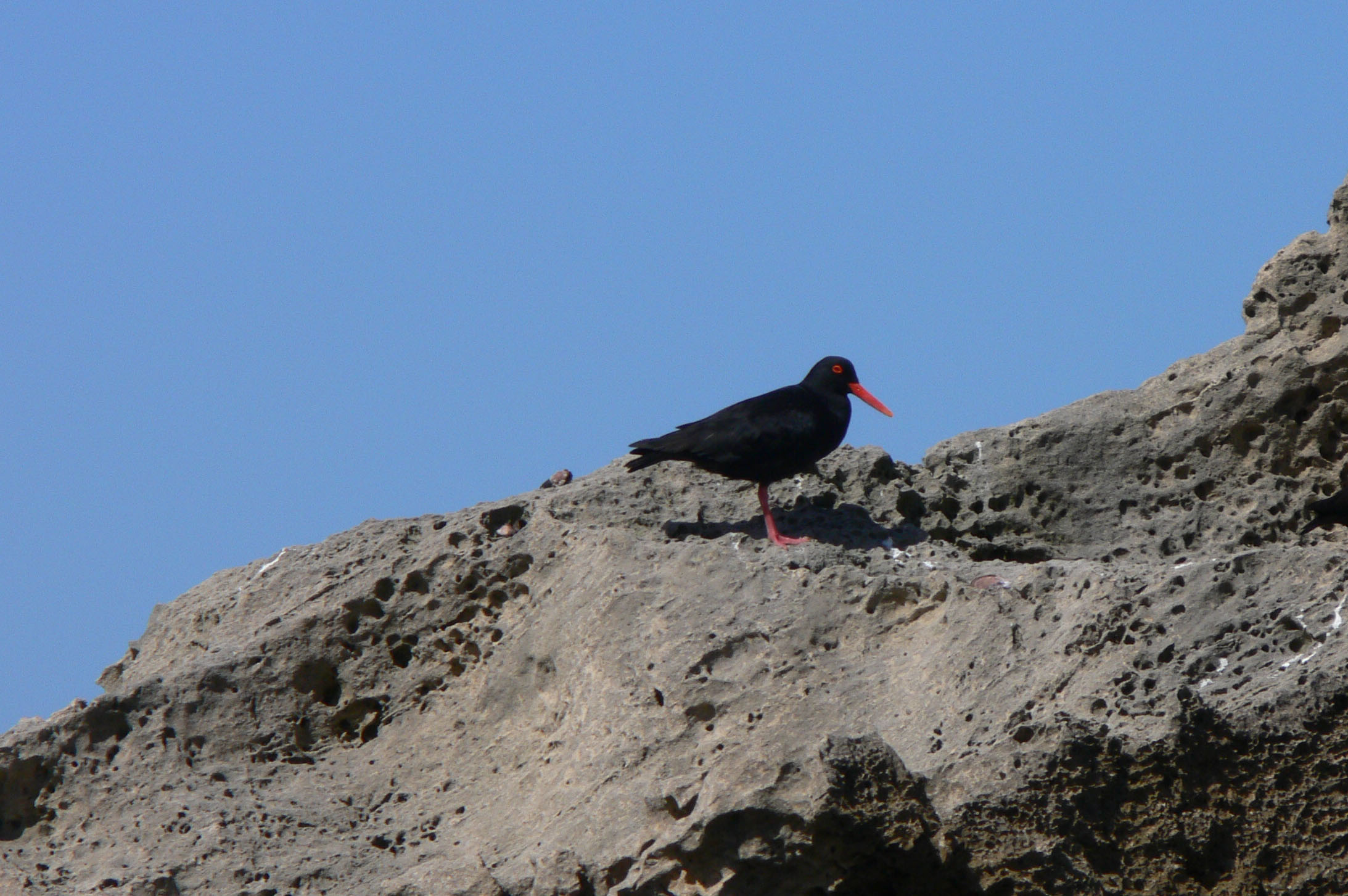
Haematopus moquini

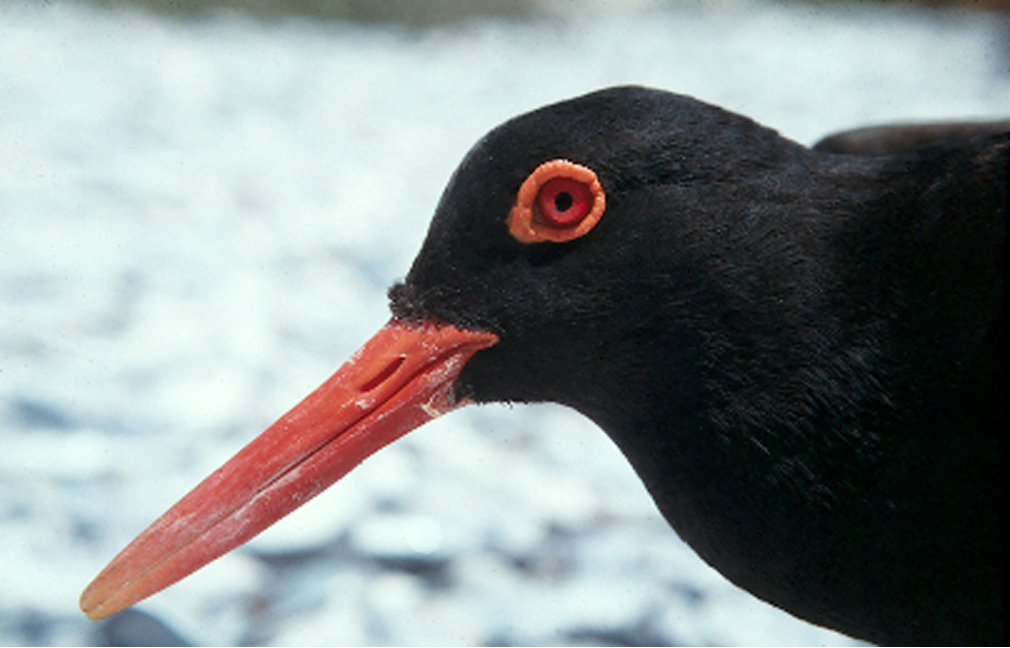
Haematopus moquini portrait

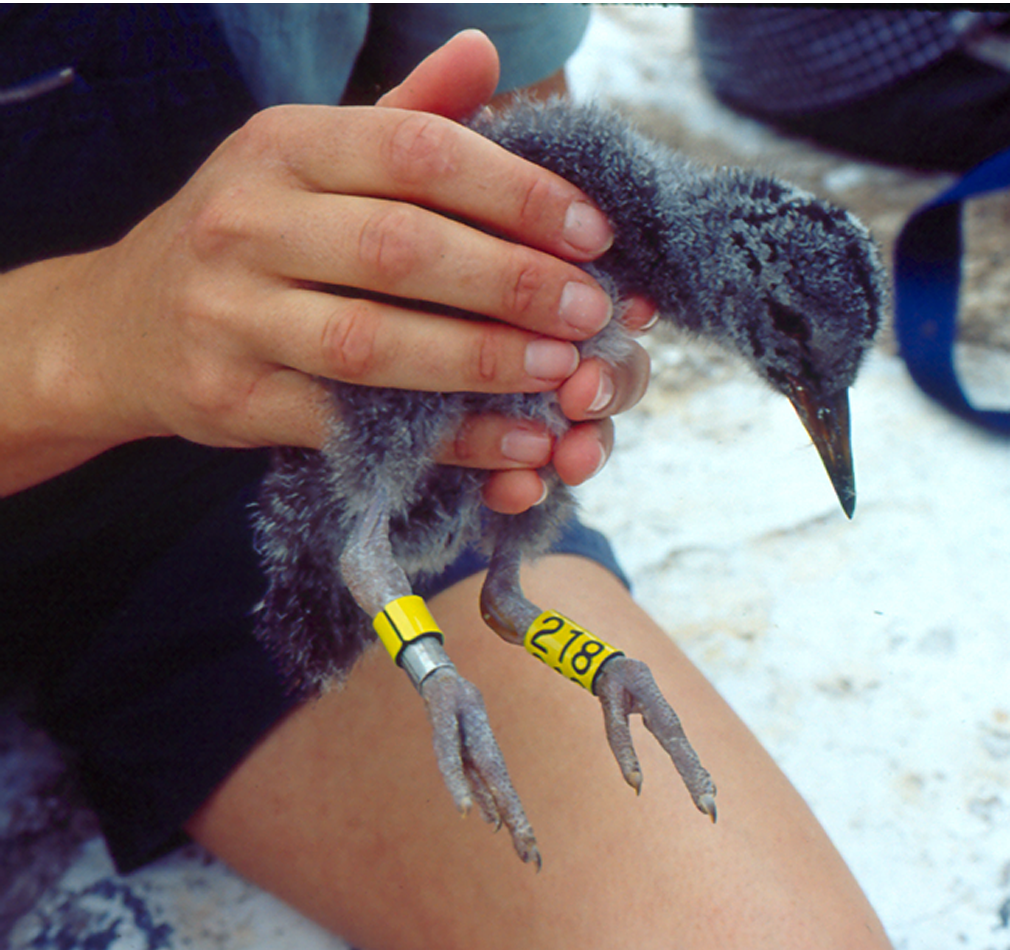
Haematopus moquini young

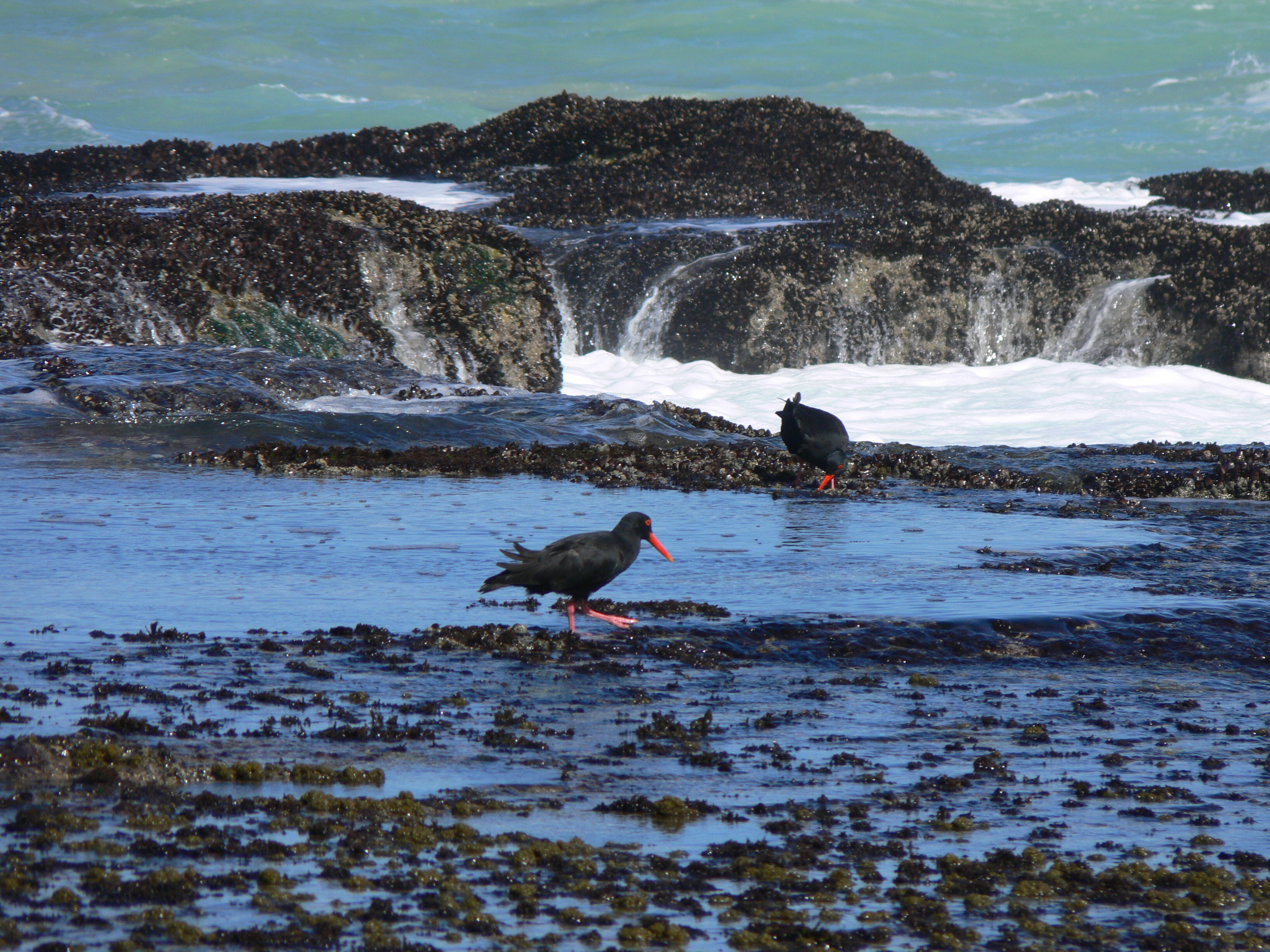
Haematopus moquini
