= Huberta (hippopotamus) =

South African hippopotamus

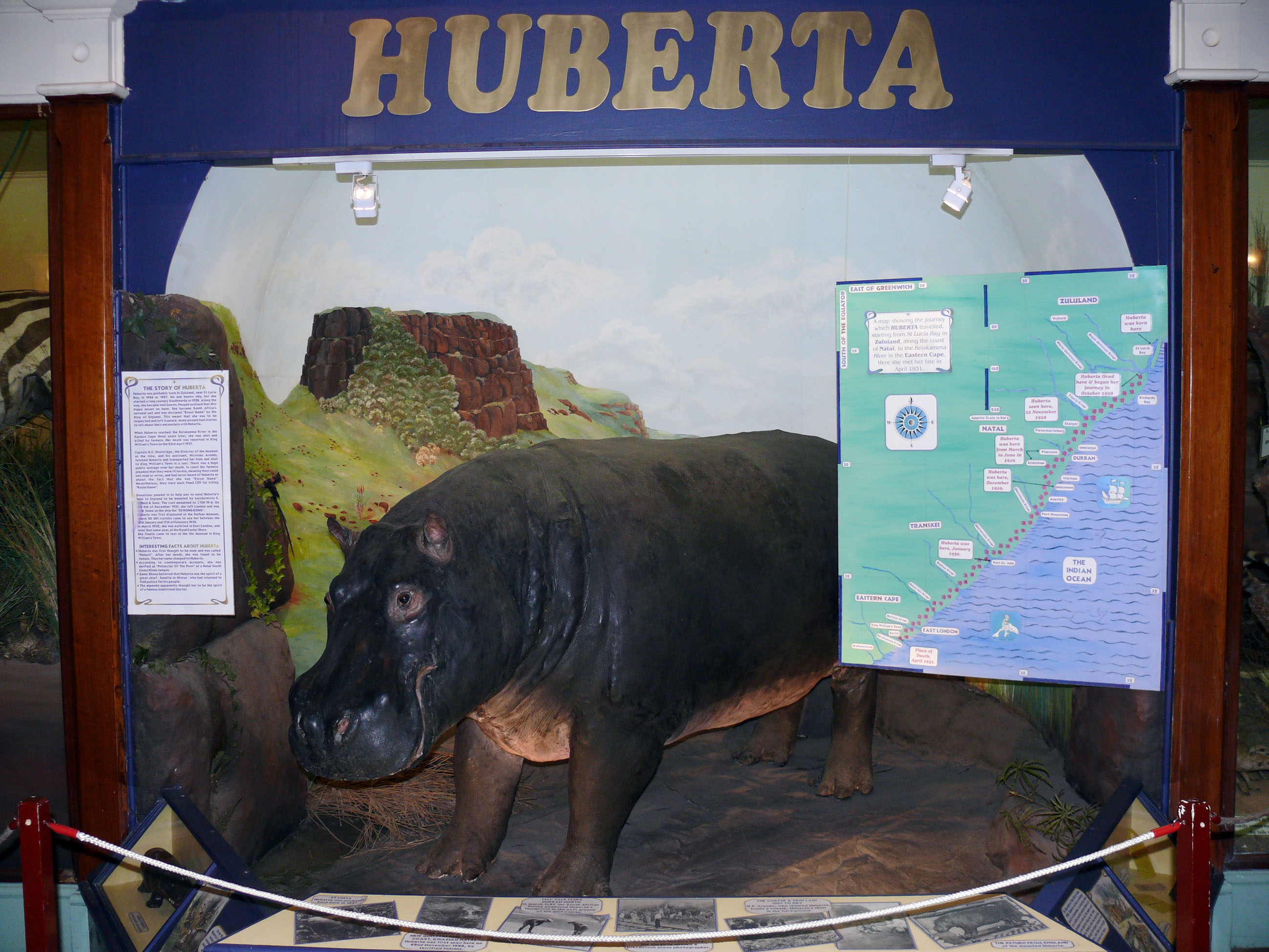
Stuffed body of Huberta at the Amathole Museum

Huberta (initially named Hubert; the sex was discovered after death) was a hippopotamus which travelled for a large distance across South Africa. In November 1928, Huberta left her waterhole in the St. Lucia Estuary in Zululand and over the next three years, travelled 1,600 kilometres (1,000 miles) to the Eastern Cape. In that time, Huberta became a minor celebrity in South Africa and attracted crowds wherever she went. She was initially thought to be a male and was nicknamed Hubert by the press. The first report in the press was on 23 November 1928 in the Natal Mercury and reported the appearance of a hippo in Natal. The report was accompanied by the only photograph of Huberta in life.

Huberta stopped for a while at the mouth of the Mhlanga River about 15 kilometres (9 mi) north of Durban, and a failed attempt was made to capture her and put her in the Johannesburg Zoo. After this, she headed south to Durban where she visited a beach and a country club. Moving on to the Umgeni River, she became revered by Zulus and Xhosas alike.

Finally, Huberta arrived in East London (officially named KuGompo City since February 2026) in March 1931. Despite her having been declared to be protected royal game by the Natal Provincial Council, she was shot by farmers a month later. After a public outcry, the farmers were arrested and fined £25. Huberta's body was recovered and sent to a taxidermist in London. Upon her return to South Africa in 1932, she was greeted by 20,000 people and was displayed at the Amathole Museum in Qonce.

Huberta is the subject of the children's book Hubert The Traveling Hippopotamus by Edmund Lindop and illustrated by Jane Carlson. The book was published in 1961 by Little, Brown and Company.

== See also ==
- List of individual hippopotamids
