= Southern African Bird Atlas Project =

Citizen science project

The Southern African Bird Atlas Project (SABAP) was conducted between 1987 and 1991. Because a new bird atlas was started in southern Africa in 2007, the earlier project is now referred to as SABAP1. The new atlas project is known as the Second Southern African Bird Atlas Project, and is abbreviated to SABAP2. The project is ongoing, and is now managed by the FitzPatrick Institute of African Ornithology at the University of Cape Town. Most of the data capture happens through the application BirdLasser. The project is currently funded by BirdLife South Africa and the South African National Biodiversity Institute.

== Scope ==
SABAP covered six countries: Botswana, Lesotho, Namibia, South Africa, Eswatini and Zimbabwe. At the time, Mozambique was engulfed in a civil war, and had to be excluded. The resolution for SABAP1 was the quarter degree grid cell (QDGC), 15 minutes of latitude by 15 minutes of longitude, 27.4 km north–south and about 25 km east–west, an area of about 700 km². However, in Botswana a half degree grid cell was used. The total number of grid cells, taking account of the coarser resolution in Botswana, was 3973. Fieldwork was conducted mainly in the five-year period 1987–1991, but the project coordinators included all suitable data collected from 1980–1987. In some areas, particularly those that were remote and inaccessible, data collection continued until 1993.

Fieldwork was undertaken mainly by birders, and most of it was done on a volunteer basis. Fieldwork consisted of compiling bird lists for the QDGCs. All the checklists were fully captured into a database. The final dataset consisted of 147 605 checklists, containing a total of 7.3 million records of bird distribution. Of the total 3973 QDGCs, only 88 had no checklists (2.2% of the total).

Project coordination was undertaken by the Avian Demography Unit (ADU) at the University of Cape Town. The unit changed its name in 2008 to Animal Demography Unit, to reflect its expanding ambit, but retained the acronym ADU. The Animal Demography Unit was closed down in 2018.

== Products ==
The final product of the project was a two-volume set of A4-sized books, covering 932 species, with a total of 1500 pages, published in 1997 by BirdLife South Africa. The books are now out of print, but the individual species texts are available on the SABAP2 website. Volume 1 also contains a chapter on the relevance of southern African geography to birds. The Atlas of Southern African Birds was, at the time of publication, the largest biodiversity project ever conducted in Africa. This project showed that birdlife in southern Africa reflects the wide diversity of habitats in the region: 9% of the world's bird species are regularly found there, even though it constitutes only 1.67% of the world's land area.

== Impact ==
The impact of the project on southern African ornithology was considerable. The species texts did not only provide information on distribution, but also presented new information and analyses on the seasonality of breeding and the direction and seasonality of migration. SABAP therefore became an essential reference for all research involving these fundamental aspects of avian biology. It provided much of the information upon which the Important Bird Area selection process in southern Africa was based, and for the IUCN Red List for birds in South Africa, Lesotho and Swaziland.
