= Animal Demography Unit =

Research unit of the University of Cape Town

- Motto: To contribute to the understanding of animal populations, especially population dynamics, and thus provide input to their conservation.
- Established: 1991
- Director: Emeritus Professor Les Underhill
- Location: Cape Town, Western Cape, South Africa
- Website: adu.org.za/about.php

The Animal Demography Unit (ADU) is a formally recognized research unit of the University of Cape Town (UCT) located within the Department of Biological Sciences of UCT. (The Department of Biological Sciences was formed from the merger of the Department of Botany and the Department of Zoology at the start of the 2013 academic year). The Animal Demography Unit, popularly known as the ADU, was responsible for the management of the First and Second Southern African Bird Atlas Projects SABAP1 and SABAP2. The unit has submitted over eight million georeferenced biodiversity records to GBIF.

== History ==
The Animal Demography Unit (formerly the Avian Demography Unit), or ADU as it is mostly known in the vernacular, is a research unit of the University of Cape Town. Initially it was built on the nucleus of the South African Bird Ringing Unit (SAFRING) and the Southern African Bird Atlas Project (SABAP). The ADU was established in December 1991 within the Department of Statistical Sciences at the University of Cape Town. Over the years, the ADU has grown far beyond its starting point.

The concept on which the ADU is based can be traced back to 1983, when a workshop was held in Johannesburg on the establishment of a Bird Populations Data Bank for South Africa. This workshop was held in conjunction with a "Birds and Man" symposium which had been organised by the Southern African Ornithological Society (now BirdLife South Africa).

The ADU has continued to be closely associated with BirdLife South Africa. and has a formal partnership relationship with that organization, with the objective of fostering the development of further ornithological projects. This close association is appropriate because much of the research of the ADU continues to focus on large scale demographic studies in which participation by amateurs is a vital element.

Over the past years, the ADU has expanded the range of projects for which it is responsible. This website provides information on them, and the people who undertake them.
