= Tracking the Wild =

- Company type: Proprietary company
- Industry: Ecotourism, Citizen Science
- Founded: Cape Town, South Africa, 2012
- Headquarters: Cape Town, South Africa
- Products: Website, Apple & Android Apps
- Website: trackingthewild.com

Tracking the Wild is a social media platform built specifically for wildlife. The platform has a two-pronged approach. On the one hand, it is a social media tool to share wildlife sightings and provide a host of reserve specific information. On the other hand, the platform embraces crowdsourcing and citizen science to generate valuable wildlife sightings data for conservation research.

== History ==
Development of Tracking the Wild started in Cape Town in early 2012 by husband and wife team John White and Natalie White. The company officially launched in February 2014 with their website and Android app followed by the launch of their iPhone app in September 2014.

== Participation ==
The Tracking the Wild platform is based on the crowdsourcing of valuable wildlife sightings by citizen science. Tracking the Wild users submit their wildlife sightings in the form of images and/or video together with a sighting's date and time, GPS location and species name. This open data is then incorporated into an online database and shared with wildlife researchers at the University of Cape Town's Animal Demography Unit and other accredited conservation organisations.

== Protection of endangered species ==
The platform has been built to exclude rhino sightings and restrict the location information for any species whose safety could be jeopardised by its location being made public. This can be managed on a park-by-park and individual species basis.

== Protected areas covered ==
The Tracking the Wild platform currently covers over 40 national parks, nature reserves and game reserves across South Africa, Botswana, Namibia, Swaziland and Zimbabwe.
