= SAFRING =

South African bird tagging organization

The South African Bird Ringing Unit
- Established: 1948
- Parent institution: University of Cape Town
- Coordinator: Robert Thomson
- Location: Cape Town, Western Cape, South Africa
- Website: safring.birdmap.africa

The South African Bird Ringing Unit (SAFRING) is based at the University of Cape Town and provides bird ringing services in South Africa and other African countries. This entails providing ringing equipment to qualified ringers, and curating all ringing data. SAFRING communicates with ringers and interested parties via mailing lists and on social media. SAFRING liaises with the provinces who have the responsibility of issuing permits. SAFRING has a strict code of ethics to ensure the safety of birds handled. SAFRING acknowledges the importance of bird ringing in that it has been described as the most important tool in ornithology in the 20th century.

== History ==
Bird ringing in South Africa started in 1948 when the Southern African Ornithological Society (SAOS) initiated a bird ringing scheme under the leadership of Dr EH Ashton. The first birds to be ringed were 31 Cape Vultures Gyps coprotheres, ringed on 1 August 1948 at Kranzberg by a team of birders and mountaineers. A year later one of these, ring C00086 was found near Bulawayo, Zimbabwe, the first recovery of a southern African bird ring.

Bird ringing was initially organized by an NGO (Southern African Ornithological Society, SAOS) and the ringing effort steadily increased and by the 1960s the cost and complexity of administering the scheme exceeded the resources of the SAOS. The Council for Scientific and Industrial Research (CSIR) coordinated a deal whereby the four provincial conservation departments became the major sponsors of the National Unit for Bird Ringing Administration (NUBRA), in 1971, based at the University of Cape Town.

The unit became part of the Avian Demography Unit, Department of Statistical Sciences, University of Cape Town, in 1991, which became the Animal Demography Unit, and moved to the Department of Zoology, University of Cape Town, in January 2008. In 2008 SAFRING organised a wide variety of events to celebrate its 60th anniversary of bird ringing in South Africa.

Following the closure of the ADU in 2018, SAFRING was integrated into the FitzPatrick Institute of African Ornithology in the Department of Biological Sciences at the University of Cape Town.

== See also ==
- FitzPatrick Institute of African Ornithology
