= Ostrich (journal) =

Ostrich: Journal of African Ornithology
- Cover of the final issue of Ostrich for 2019
- Discipline: Ornithology
- Language: English
- Edited by: Alan Tristram Kenneth Lee

Publication details
- History: 1930–present
- Publisher: BirdLife South Africa, National Inquiry Services Centre (NISC), Taylor & Francis (South Africa)
- Frequency: Quarterly
- Open access: Hybrid
- Impact factor: 1.364 (2020)

Standard abbreviations
- ISO 4: Ostrich

Indexing
- ISSN: 0030-6525 (print); 1727-947X (web)

Links
- Journal homepage; Scopus CiteScore; Scimago journal and country rank

Ostrich: Journal of African Ornithology is a journal of African ornithology published by BirdLife South Africa, formerly the South African Ornithological Society, in association with the National Inquiry Services Centre (NISC) and Taylor & Francis. It contains papers on the birds of Africa and its islands, including peer-reviewed original scientific papers of 3000 to 5,000 words, short articles of up to 3000 words, perspectives, commentaries and reviews. Topics include behaviour, breeding, biology, conservation, ecology, migrations, movements and systematics. This is a hybrid journal: offering open access publishing, but also following the standard publishing model without charges to authors.

The journal achieved its highest ever 5-year impact factor in 2020 of 1.255. The highest impact factor was 1.364 for 2020. The CiteScore has been a consistent 1.3 over the 2017-2019 period.

Previous editors include: Austin Roberts, R Bigalke, J Vincent, G.J. Broekhuysen, M.K. 'Bunty' Rowan, Gordon Maclean, Alan Kemp, Adrian Craig, Richard Dean, Ara Monadjem, Lizanne Roxburgh. The current Editor-in-Chief is Alan Lee as of 2016.

== See also ==
- List of ornithological journals
