= Amathole Museum =

South African museum

Coordinates: 32°52′37.87″S 27°23′29.74″E

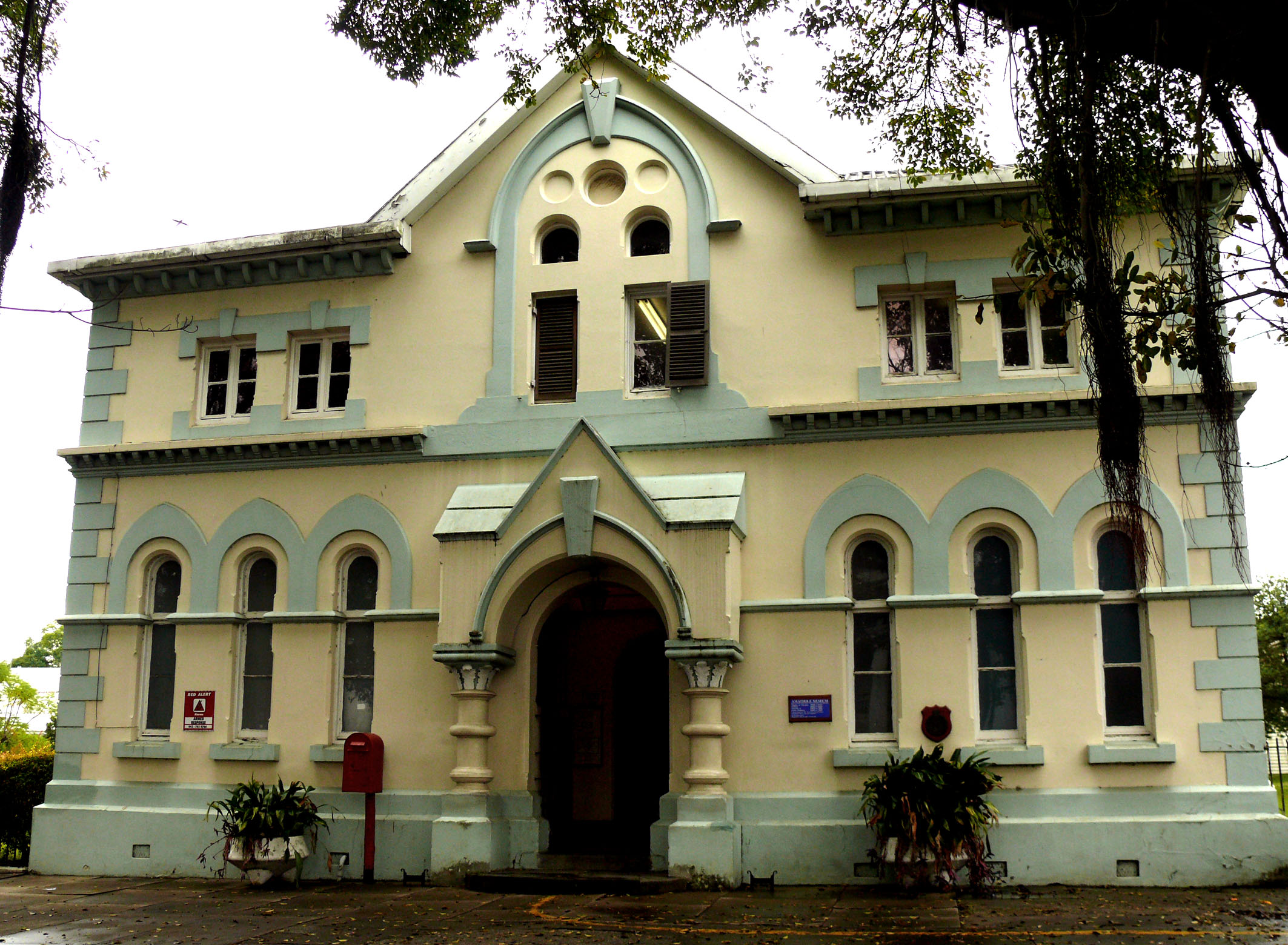
- Established: October 1898
- Location: Qonce, Eastern Cape, South Africa
- Type: natural and cultural history

The Amathole Museum, formerly the Kaffrarian Museum is a natural and cultural history museum located in Qonce in the Eastern Cape province of South Africa. The museum houses a large collection of mammals and includes the taxidermied body of Huberta, the hippopotamus.

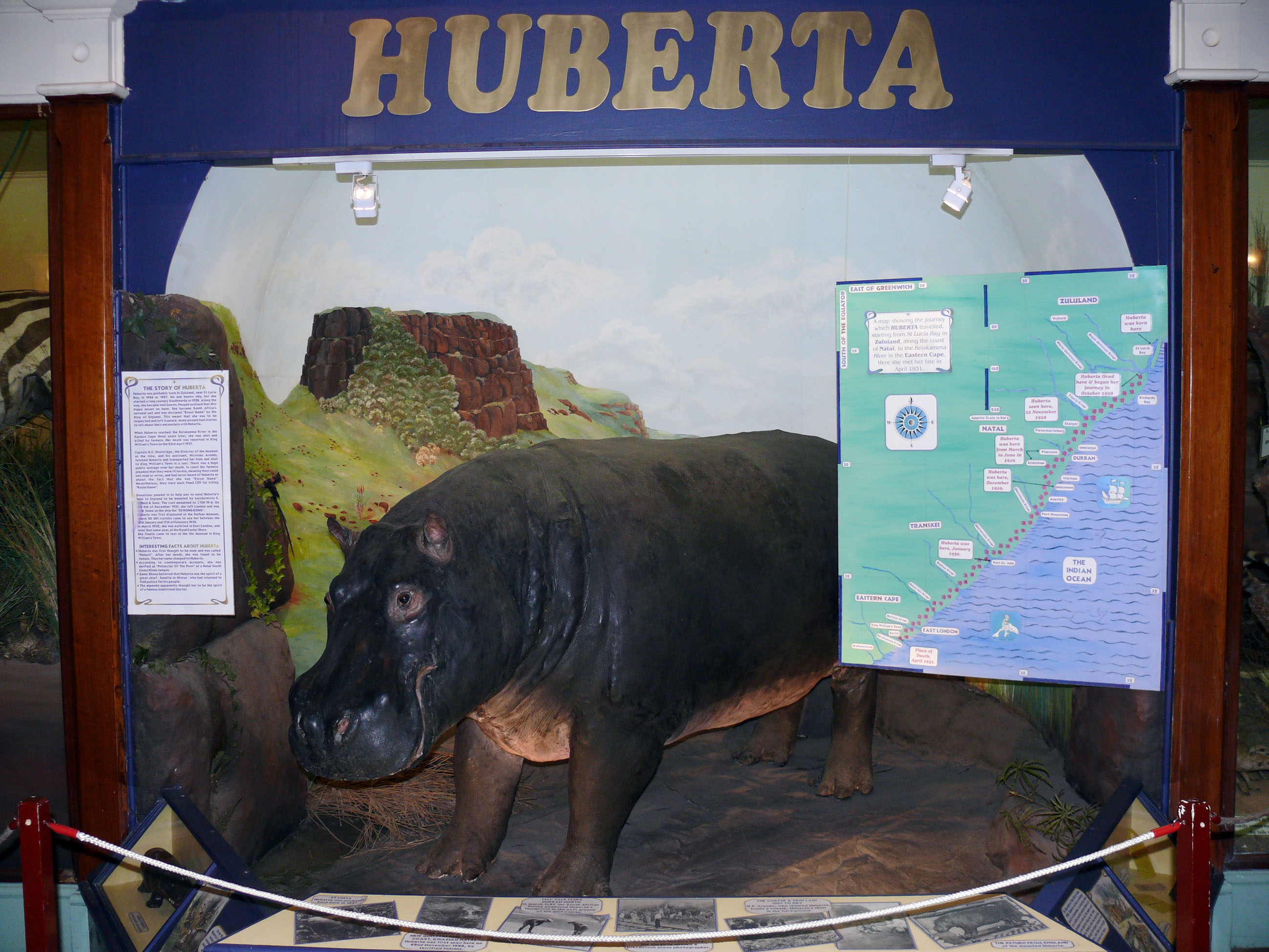
Huberta exhibit

The Xhosa Gallery, housed in the old post office building, concentrates on the cultural history of all tribes of the Xhosa nation. The history section has artefacts, documents and photographs of local interest dating back to the 19th century. The Missionary Museum contains information on missionary endeavours in this area. The museum was founded in 1884 and was later opened to the public in October 1898. The name of the museum was changed from the Kaffrarian Museum to the Amathole Museum in 1999.
