= SABAP2 =

Citizen science project

SABAP2 is the acronym for the Southern African Bird Atlas Project 2, which is the follow-up to the Southern African Bird Atlas Project (for which the acronym was SABAP, and which is now referred to as SABAP1). The first atlas project took place from 1987 to 1991. The current project was a joint venture between the Animal Demography Unit at the University of Cape Town, BirdLife South Africa, and the South African National Biodiversity Institute (SANBI). Following the closure of the Animal Demography Unit, the project is now managed by the FitzPatrick Institute of African Ornithology, University of Cape Town. The project aims to map the distribution and relative abundance of birds in southern Africa, and the original atlas area included South Africa, Lesotho, and Eswatini, although since 2012 the project has expanded to include Namibia, Botswana, Zimbabwe and Mozambique. SABAP2 was launched on 1 July 2007. The field work for this project is conducted by more than 1700 volunteers, known as citizen scientists – they collect the data in the field at their own cost and in their own time. As such they make a huge contribution to the conservation of birds and their habitat.

By June 2015, the SABAP2 database contained more than 128,000 checklists, and a total of 7.4 million records of bird distribution in the project database. In June 2015, the number of SABAP2 records exceeded that of SABAP1 for the first time. More than 72% of the original SABAP2 atlas area (i.e. South Africa, Lesotho and Eswatini) had at least one checklist by that time. This information is updated continuously on the project website; see §External links below.

A number of postgraduate research projects have been based partially or completely on SABAP data, either from SABAP1 only, SABAP2 only, or comparing the changes in bird distributions and reporting rates from SABAP1 to SABAP2; and many scientific research articles have also been published on these and other analyses.

== Atlassing protocol ==
In SABAP1, bird lists were collected for quarter degree grid cells, which are 15 minutes by 15 minutes, or approximately 27 km by 25 km in size. In SABAP2, the resolution is far higher: the unit of data collection is the pentad – five minutes of latitude by five minutes of longitude – i.e. squares with sides of roughly 9 km, one ninth the size of quarter degree grid cells. There are 17,000 pentads in the original atlas area of South Africa, Lesotho and Eswatini, and a further 10,000 in Namibia.

SABAP2 accepts data submitted either as ad-hoc records, or "full protocol" cards. For a full protocol card, a minimum of 2 hours and a maximum of 5 days can be spent adding birds to a checklist (card) for a pentad. An effort should be made to visit all available habitats. Ad-hoc records do not meet the criteria of time spent or coverage. Contributors are encouraged to submit 'full protocol' cards, as the information is used to calculate measures of relative abundance, e.g. reporting rate. Reporting rate is how often a species is recorded across a set of full protocol cards, usually expressed as a percentage. For example, if a pentad has 10 cards submitted, and a species is recorded for 4 of these, then the reporting rate is 40%. Ad-hoc records and full protocol cards help map species distribution, while only full protocol cards can be used to measure abundance, and changes in abundance.

Since 2015, most data to the project is contributed using the BirdLasser app, developed by Lejint.
