= BirdLife South Africa =

South African ornithological conservation organisation

- Headquarters: Isdell House
- Location: Johannesburg, South Africa
- CEO: Mark D. Anderson
- Publication: African Birdlife magazine: https://africanbirdlife.org.za
- Website: https://www.birdlife.org.za/

BirdLife South Africa, formerly the South African Ornithological Society (SAOS), is the South African national partner organisation of BirdLife International. It has been the regional partner of BirdLife International since 1996.

It has a membership of 5,000, many of whom belong to more than 32 affiliated bird clubs. BirdLife South Africa's vision is to promote the enjoyment, understanding, study and conservation of wild birds and their habitats. It publishes an ornithological journal, Ostrich, covering the birds of Africa and its islands, as well as the magazine African Birdlife.

One of the major projects with which it is involved is the Second Southern African Bird Atlas Project (SABAP2). It is one of three partners which lead this project: the other two are the Animal Demography Unit at the University of Cape Town and the South African National Biodiversity Institute (SANBI).

BirdLife South Africa has three Honorary Patrons: Gaynor Rupert, Precious Moloi-Motsepe and Mark Shuttleworth, and a former Honorary Patron: Pamela Isdell.

== List of affiliated bird clubs ==
- Barberton Bird Club
- BirdLife Border
- BirdLife Eastern Cape
- BirdLife Eastern Free State
- BirdLife eThekwini KZN
- BirdLife Free Sate
- BirdLife Harties
- BirdLife Inkwazi
- BirdLife KZN Midlands
- BirdLife Lowveld
- BirdLife Northern Gauteng
- BirdLife Northern Natal
- BirdLife Overberg
- BirdLife Plettenberg Bay
- BirdLife Polokwane
- BirdLife Port Natal
- BirdLife President Ridge
- BirdLife Rustenburg
- BirdLife Sandton
- BirdLife Sani
- BirdLife Sisonke
- BirdLife Soutpansberg
- BirdLife Trogons
- BirdLife Wesvaal
- BirdLife Worcester
- BirdLife Zululand
- Cape Bird Club
- Cuckoo Bird Club
- Hermanus Bird Club
- Ladysmith Birders
- Lakes Bird Club
- Phalaborwa Bird Club
- Rand Barbet Bird Club
- Somerset West Bird Club
- Stanford Bird Club
- Tygerberg Bird Club
- Vaal Bird Club
- Wakkerstroom Bird Club
- West Coast Bird Club
- Witwatersrand Bird Club

== See also ==
- Birdwatching
- Marutswa Forest Trail & Boardwalk, a project in which BirdLife South Africa is a partner.
